= Women in the Polish Army =

Women in the Polish Army participated in many battles throughout modern history. The greatest participation of women in combat occurred during World War II within the Home Army (Polish: Armia Krajowa, abbreviated AK), particularly during the Warsaw Uprising. The Germans were compelled to establish special prisoner-of-war camps for women from the Home Army.

== The Period of the First Polish Republic ==
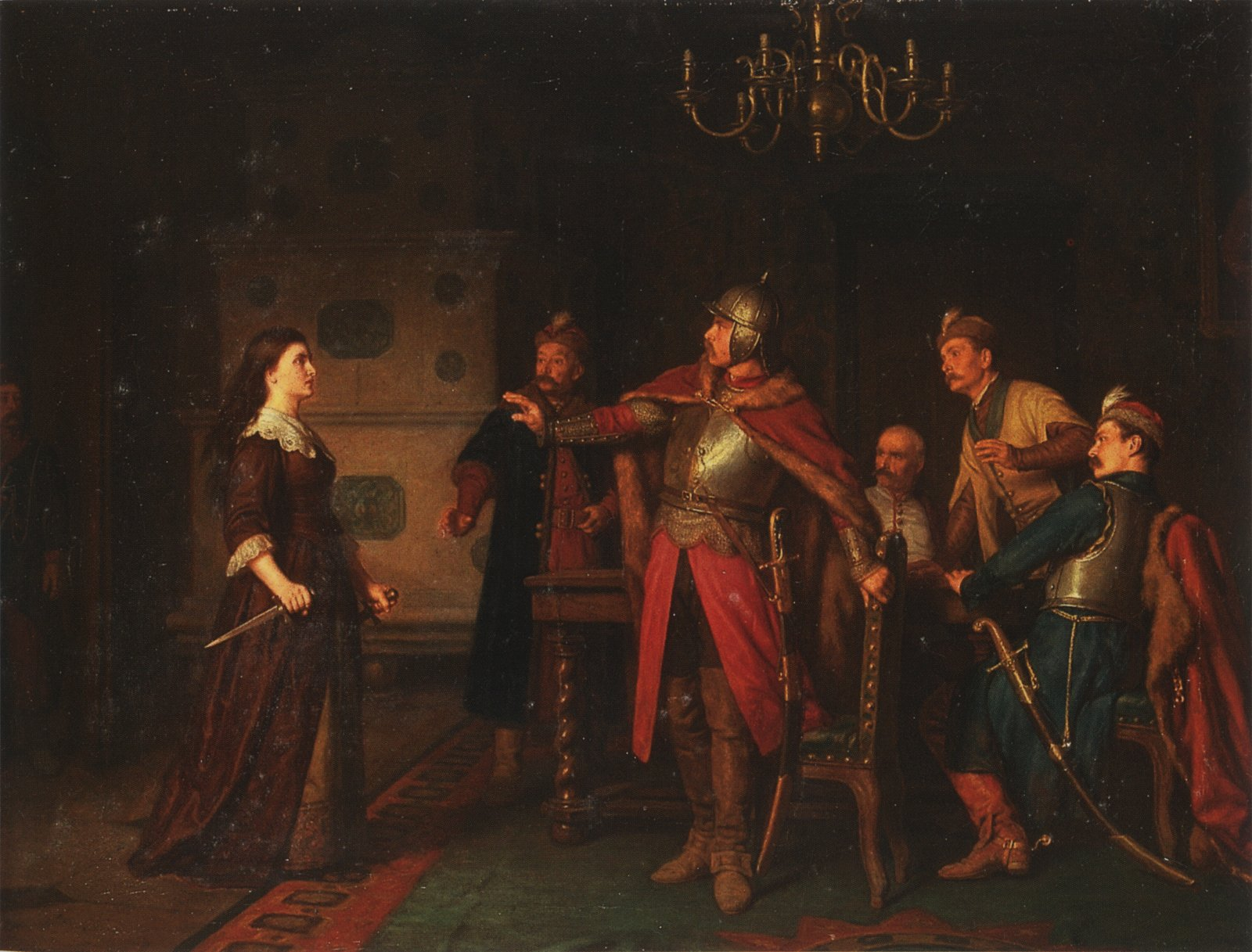
Leopold Löffler (bef. 1898), Anna Dorota Chrzanowska in the Castle at Trembowla

During the Polish–Ottoman War (1672–1676), the wife of the Polish military commander, Anna Dorota Chrzanowska, (Note: Starting in the 19th century, she also became known as Zofię Chrzanowską.) gained fame for rallying the Polish garrison during the Battle of Trembowla. The Poles put up fierce resistance against the Turks and repelled every assault by the Ottoman army, while Chrzanowska became a heroine of patriotic literature. She was also commemorated by a monument in Trembowla, which was destroyed after World War II and reconstructed in 2012.

== The November Uprising ==
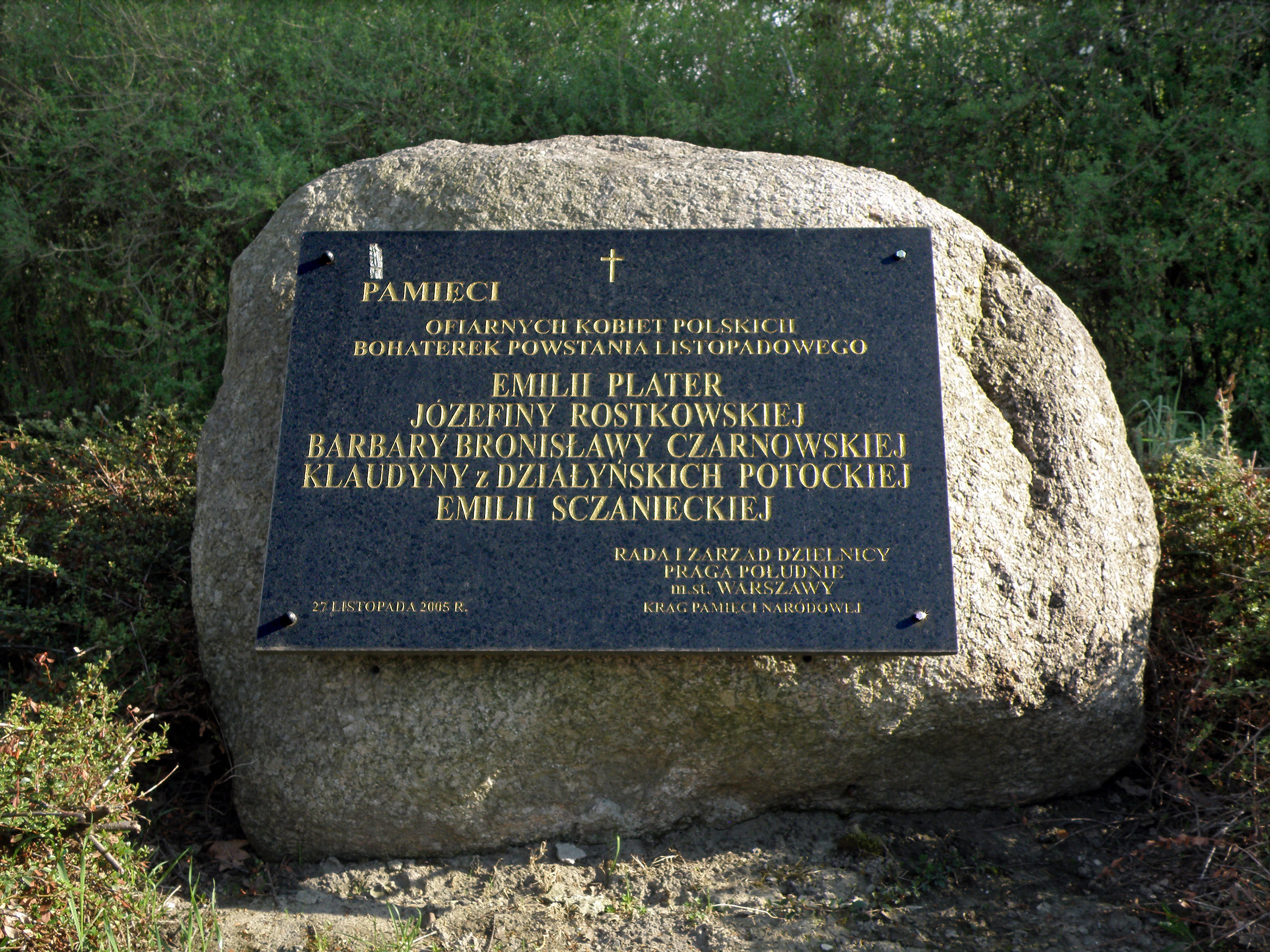
A monument honoring several November Uprising heroines.

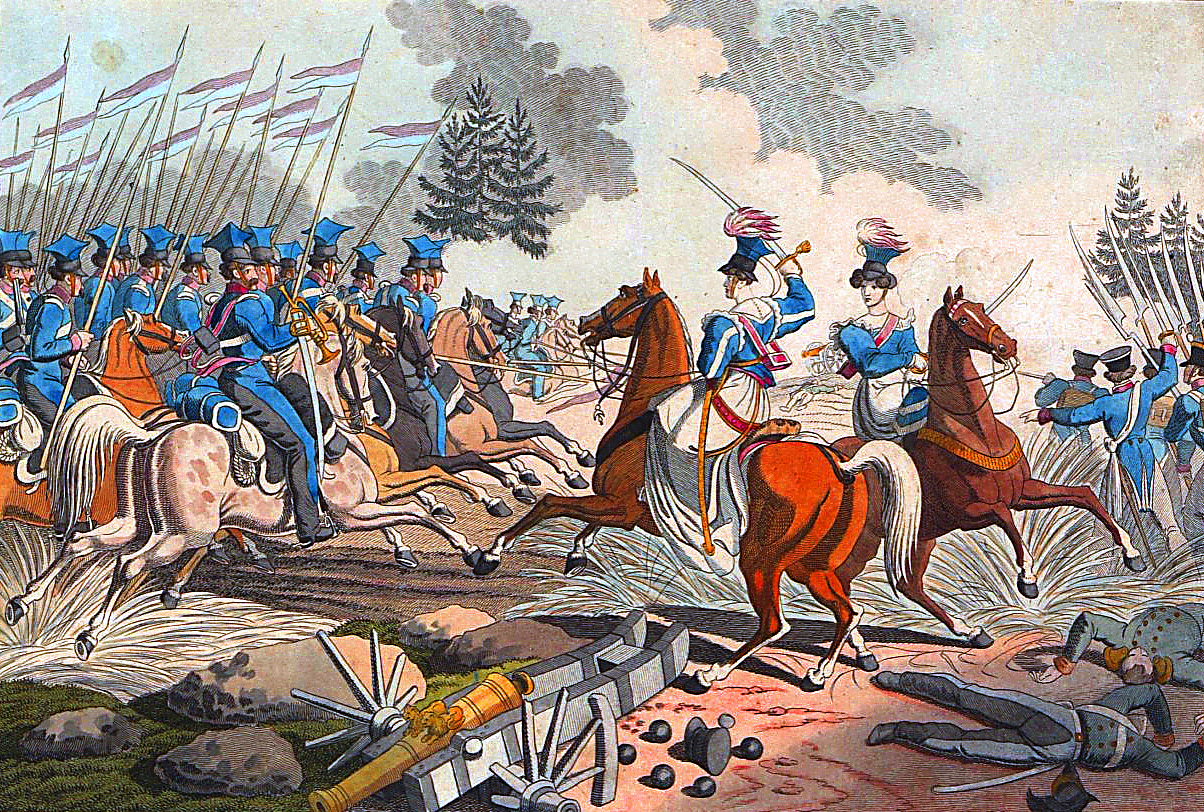
Emilia Plater in November Uprising 1831, with a female companion; Georg Benedikt Wunder (mid 19th c)

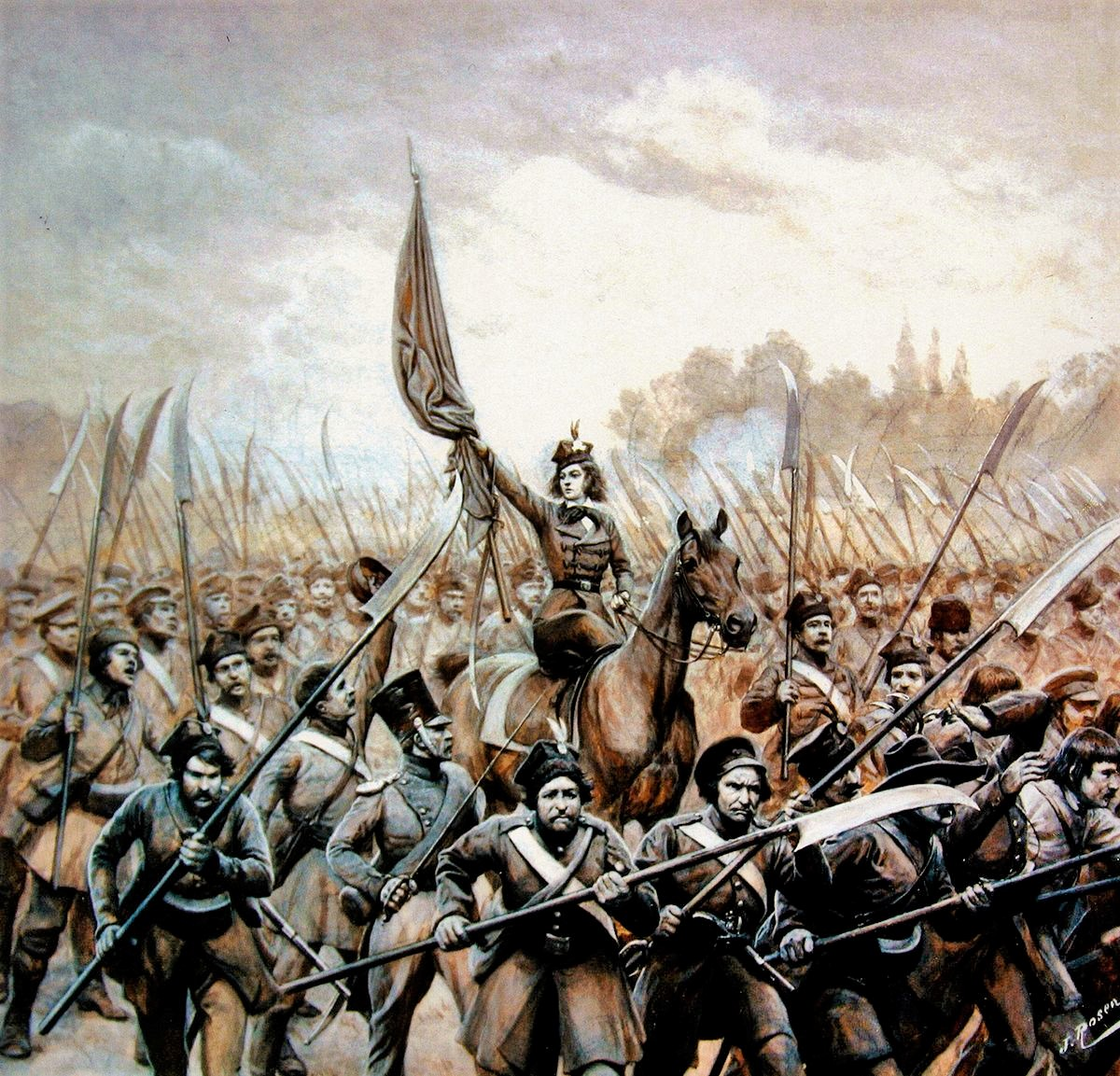
Emilia Plater conducting Polish scythemen, Jan Rosen (late 19th c)

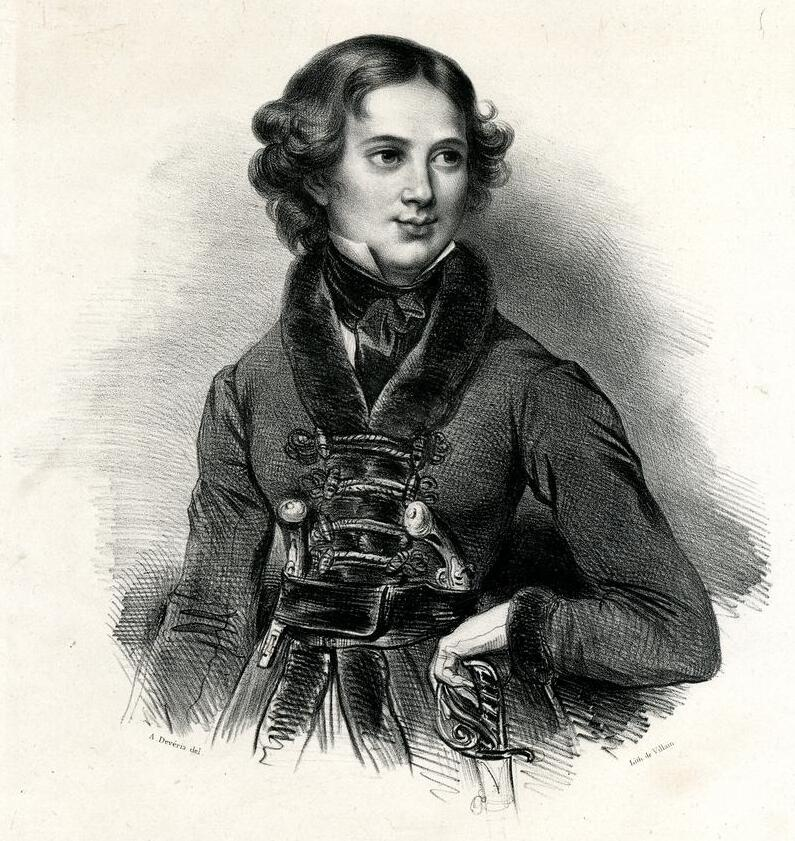
Maria Raszanowicz, Achille Devéria (c. 1832–1837)

During the November Uprising (1830–1831), Polish women established organizations that provided auxiliary support to the insurgents. Members of the Union of Patriotic Charity of Warsaw Women tended to the wounded and, at night, stood guard over field hospitals in a manner modeled after military protocol. Józefa Rostkowska served as a senior surgeon in the 10th Line Infantry Regiment of the Congress Kingdom. While tending to the wounded on the battlefield, she sustained a leg injury. For her meritorious service, she was awarded the Silver Cross of the Order of Virtuti Militari. Another medical assistant decorated with the Order of Virtuti Militari for tending to the wounded during the uprising was Anna Okęszyc.

In their memoirs, participants in the fighting also described Polish women who took part in combat with weapons in hand. The first such instance was recorded as early as 29 November during the fighting near the Royal Arsenal, where an unidentified young woman—brandishing a saber—marched alongside the 4th Line Infantry Regiment of the Congress Kingdom (known as the Czwartacy). The widow of a Colonel Dembiński became a legendary figure; fighting rifle in hand within the ranks of the volunteers, she engaged Russian troops in the Wola district. Barbara Bronisława Czarnowska also participated in the fighting, having been accepted as a cadet into the 1st Augustów Cavalry Regiment. Czarnowska rejected suggestions from fellow soldiers—who, citing her gender, proposed she remain at headquarters—and instead took an active part in the battles fought in Warsaw. In the autumn of 1831, she participated in the Battle of Sierpc, following which she was promoted to non-commissioned officer and awarded the Silver Cross of the Order of Virtuti Militari.

The most famous woman to participate in the November Uprising was Emilia Plater, who—together with her friend Maria Prószyńska—cut off her long hair, donned men's attire, and, armed with pistols and a dagger, recruited a unit in the town of Dusetos in Lithuania consisting of 280 riflemen armed with double-barreled guns, 60 cavalrymen, and several hundred scythe-bearers. This unit—which went down in history as "Countess Plater's Detachment"—captured the Daugailiai station on 30 March 30 1831, and on 2 April, fought a victorious skirmish against a Russian reconnaissance patrol near Uciana. Emilia and Cezary Plater commanded the unit, while Maria Prószyńska served as her friend's adjutant. On 30 April, the unit joined the insurgent forces under the command of Karol Załuski. Plater took part in the Battle of Prystowiany. Following a defeat, the riflemen returned to their home district and, on 17 May, captured Wiłkomierz. There, Emilia met another woman fighting in the uprising—Maria Raszanowiczówna—who from that moment on became her inseparable companion. Together with Maria, Emilia fought in the partisan units of Konstanty Parczewski near Mejszagoła.

== The interwar period ==
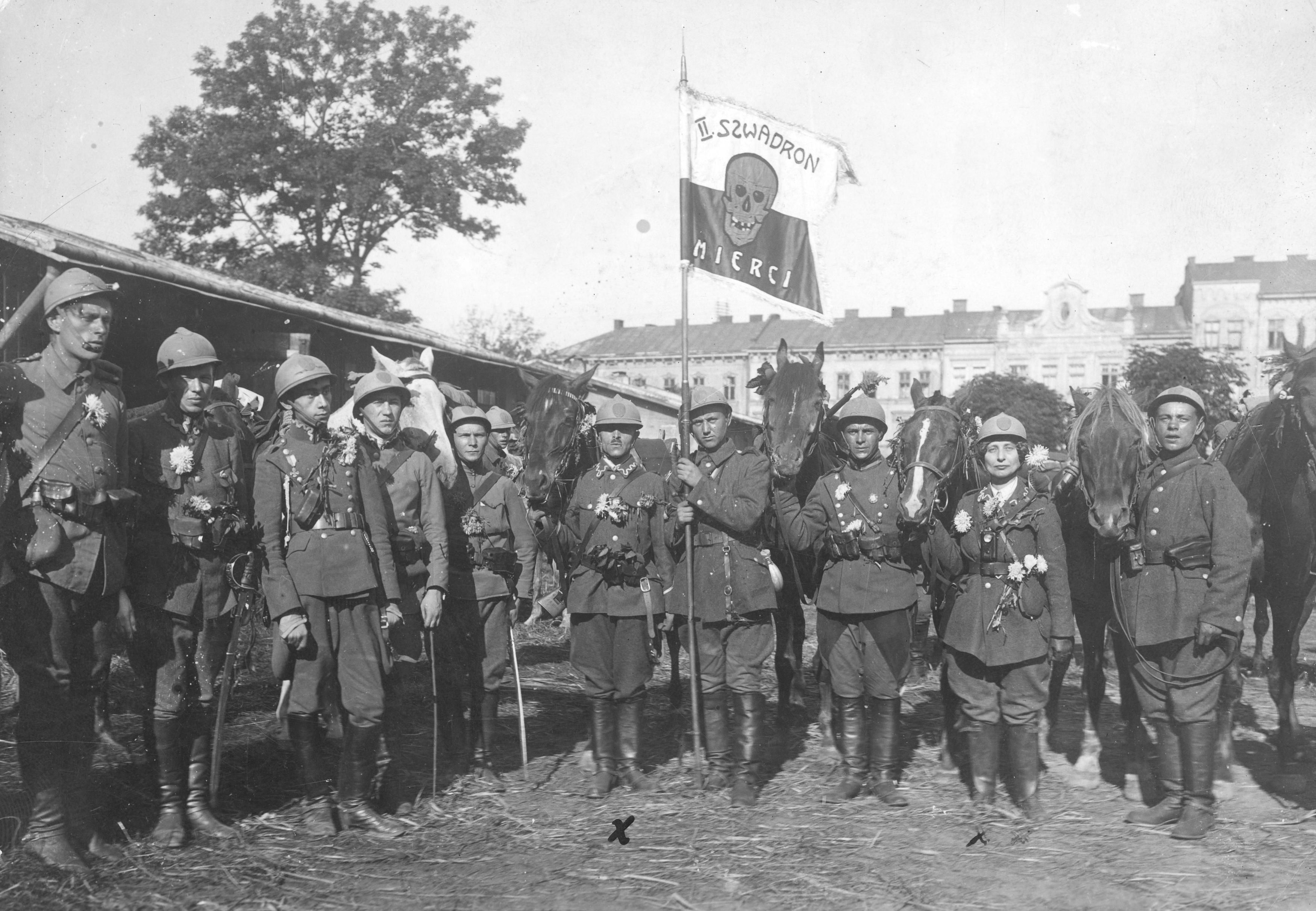
Janina Łada-Walicka (on the right) in the ranks of the lancers of the 2nd Volunteer Death Squadron during the fighting for Lwów in 1920

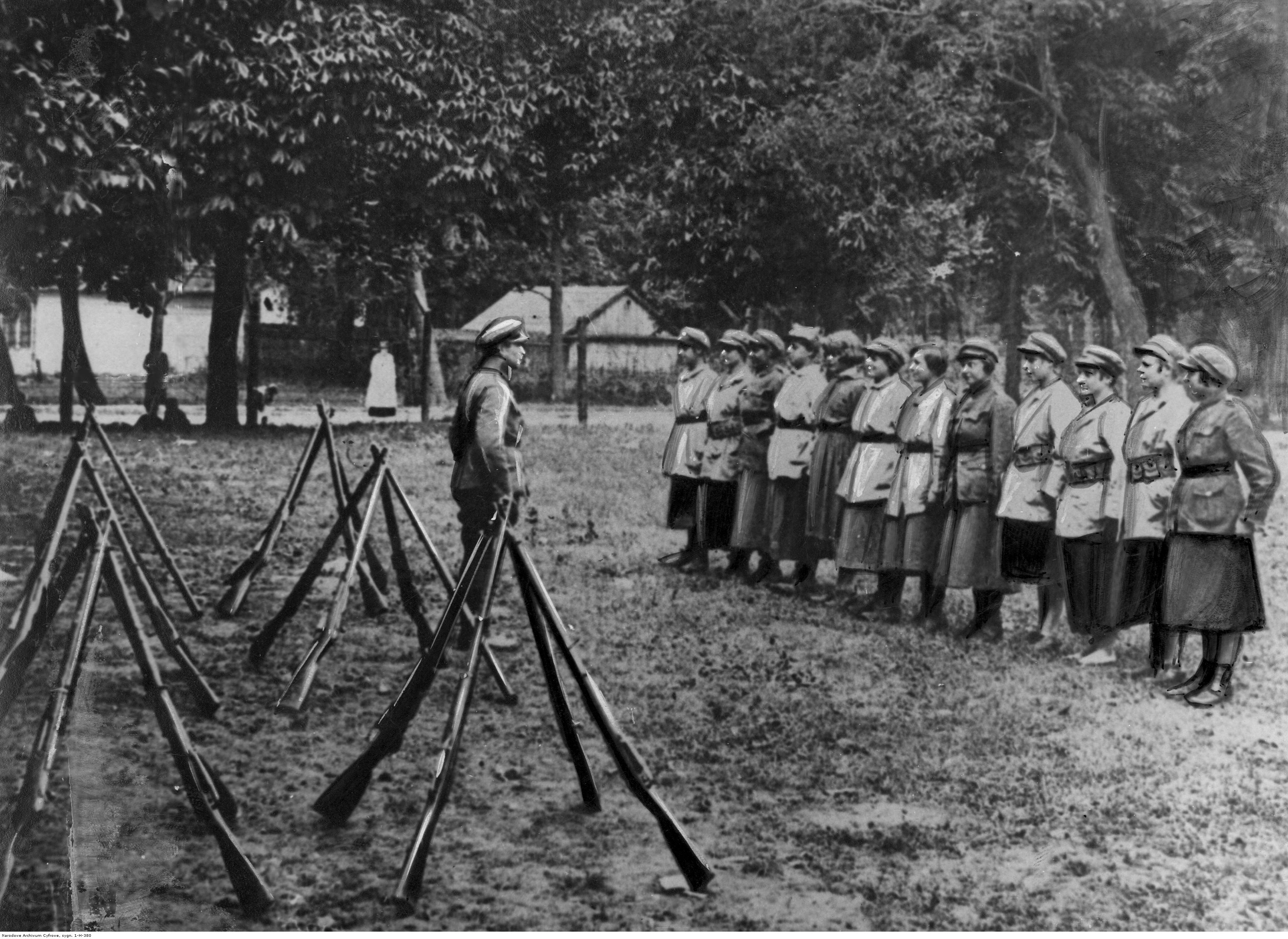
Polish–Soviet War – a volunteer women's unit during drill practice, 1920

Women took part in the struggles for Poland's borders, including the Polish–Ukrainian War and the Polish–Soviet War. Many women participated in combat as soldiers. Separate women's squads existed within the Polish Military Organisation. Among the most renowned female soldiers were Aleksandra Zagórska, organizer and commander of the Voluntary Legion of Women; Janina Łada-Walicka, a non-commissioned officer in the Polish Army and a uhlan; and Stefania Wojtulanis-Karpińska (nom de guerre "Barbara")—a captain-pilot in the Polish Air Forces and a sports pilot.

Following the restoration of independence in the Second Polish Republic, an Act of the Sejm of the Republic of Poland passed in April 1938 regarding universal military service established women's right to perform auxiliary military service, encompassing anti-aircraft, guard, communications duties, and other areas.

== World War II ==
In 1928, the Organizacja Przysposobienia Wojskowego Kobiet do Obrony Kraju [Organization for Women's Military Training for National Defense] (OPKdOK) was established. In March 1939, it was reformed and adopted the name Przysposobienie Wojskowe Kobiet [Women's Military Training] (PWK). The Supreme Commander of the PWK was Maria Wittek. That same year, on 11 February, a decree was issued granting the PWK organization the status of an association of public utility (the PWK Organization Statute). On 27 March, the PWK Main Social Council established the PWK Social Emergency Service. The task of the PWK Social Emergency Service was to coordinate and intensify social preparations in the fields of healthcare, childcare, public information, and the recruitment of auxiliary forces for the military and administration, in preparation for national defense and for providing assistance to the civilian population in the event of a war.

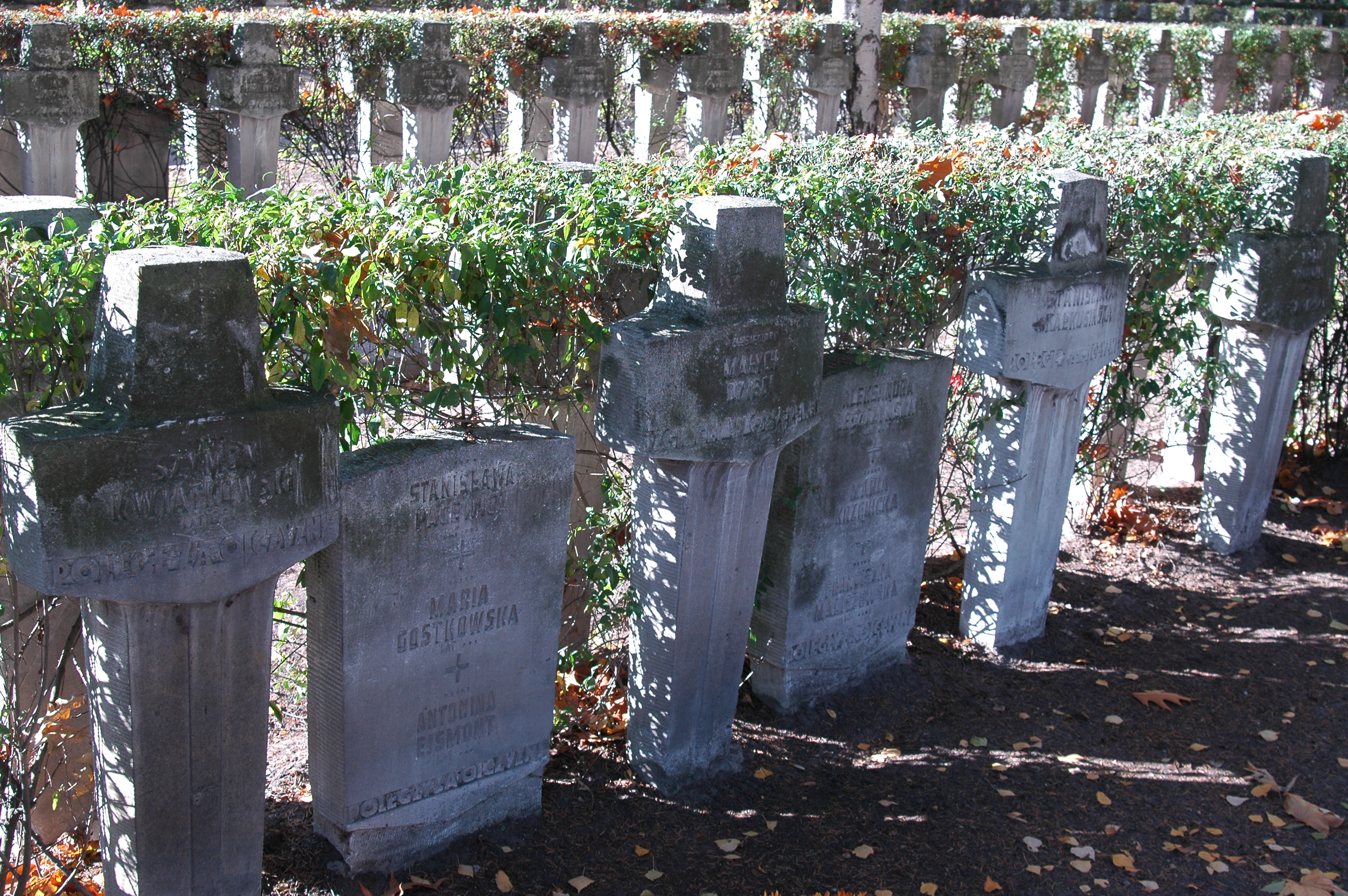
Graves at Powązki Cemetery of female soldiers killed during the Nazi Invasion of Poland

Women participated in large numbers in the Polish resistance movement. Within the ranks of the Home Army (AK), there even existed all-female units that actively engaged in diversionary operations, and even carried out assassinations and executed death sentences against informants and agents. In 1943, during Operation "C", the Polish underground carried out its first assassination in which only women participated. The target was a Gestapo informant identified as "Ch.," who had been placed on a list of individuals to be eliminated. Two women from the "Dysc" Branch, an all-female diversion and sabotage unit of the Kedyw (Directorate of Diversion) of the AK Headquarters, were assigned to carry out her elimination. The operation involved the commander of "Dysk," Wanda Gertz (nom de guerre "Lena"), and the commander of the unit's demolition squad, and Maria Jankowska (nom de guerre "Margenta").

== In the 21st Century ==
A Regulation of the Council of Ministers dated 6 April 2004, stipulates that women studying at schools providing education in the nursing or veterinary professions are required to report for conscription for service in medical roles. The Act, which has been in effect since 1 July 2004, grants women the right to hold positions in all personnel corps: the professional enlisted, non-commissioned officer, and officer corps.

In 2016, a woman assumed command of a warship of the Polish Navy for the first time.

As of March 2024, there were 17,334 women in the Polish Army, about 13 percent of the personnel. Women served as soldiers as well as in command, technical, medical, and educational roles.

The representative body for female soldiers within the Ministry of National Defence is the Council for Women. Its responsibilities include presenting opinions and analyses to the Minister of National Defence regarding matters concerning women's military service, as well as providing assistance in official matters. The Council is democratically elected by women serving in the Armed Forces of the Republic of Poland.

== Notable Polish Women Fighters ==
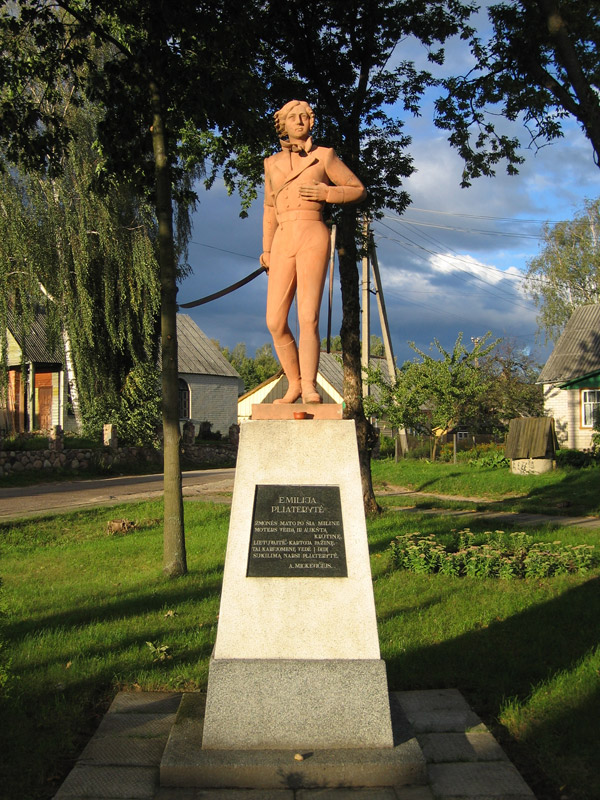
Emilia Plater monument in Kapciamiestis, Lithuania

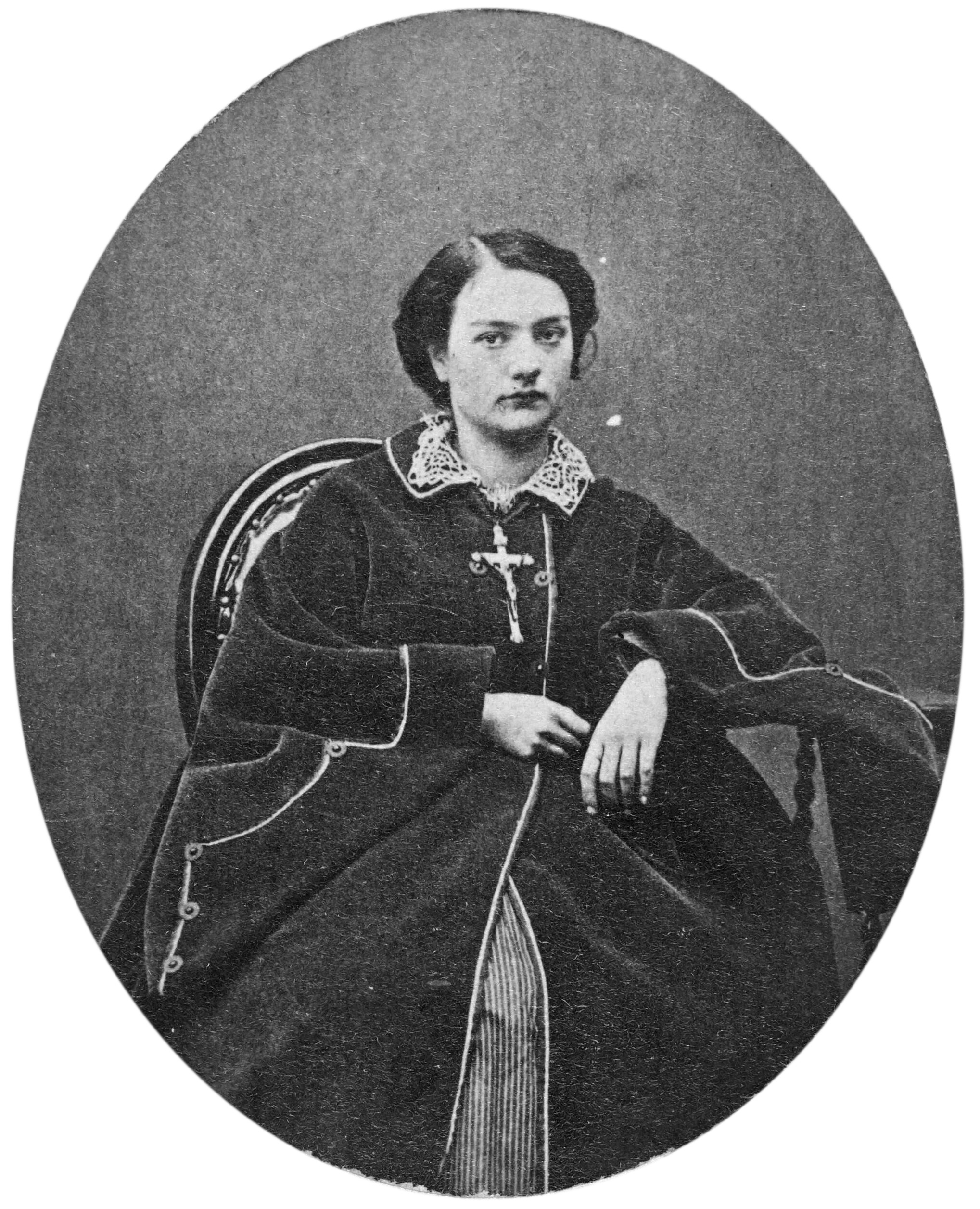
Anna Pustowójtówna, participant in the January Uprising and the Paris Commune

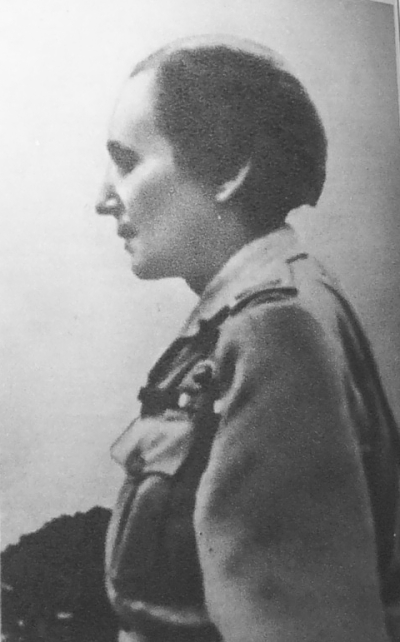
Wanda Gertz commanded an all-female AK unit of the Dysk Detachment

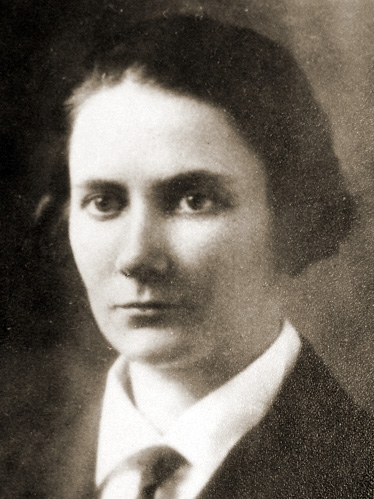
Maria Wittek, the first Polish woman to be promoted to Brigadier General, in 1991 after retirement.

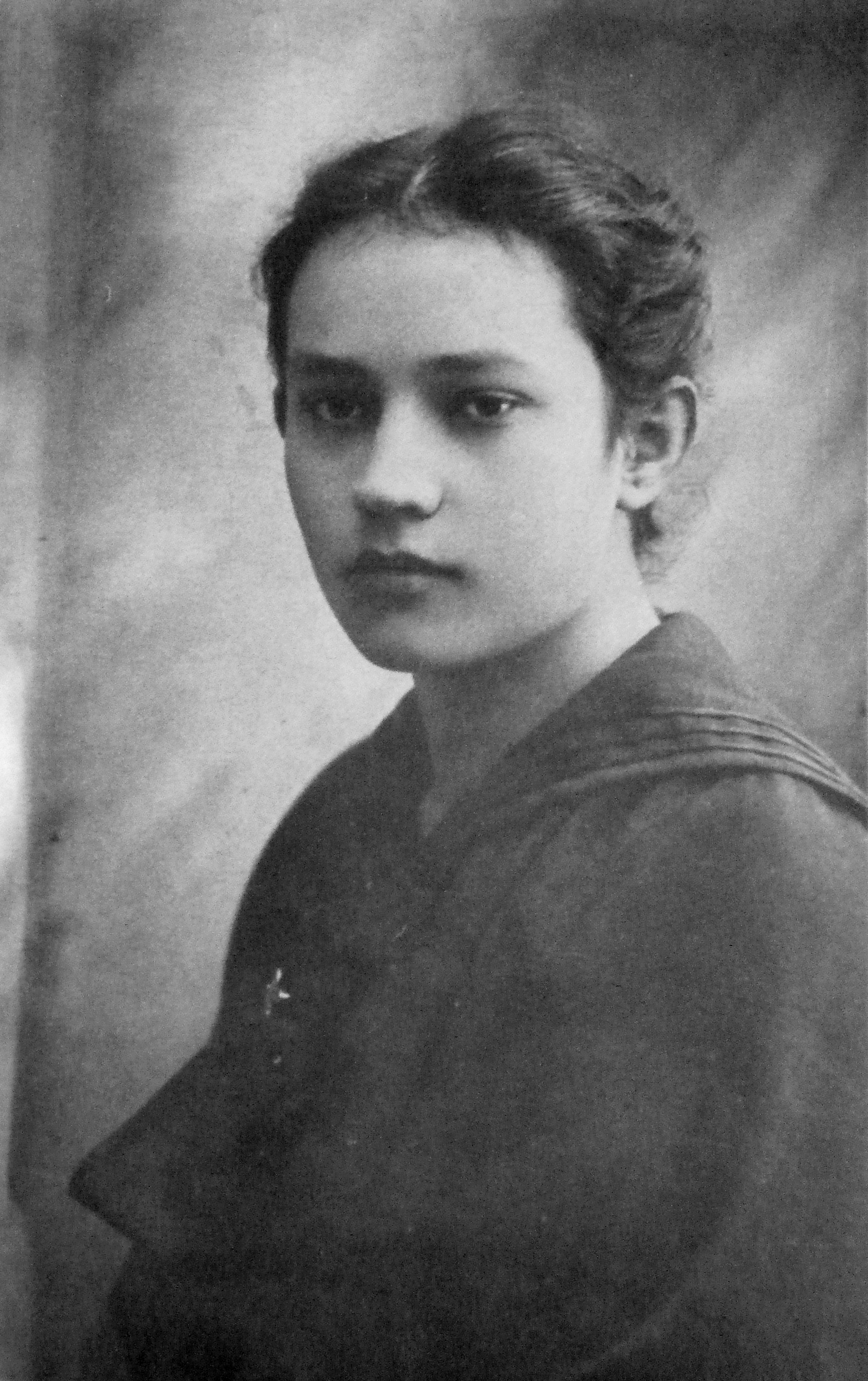
Maria Vetulani de Nisau, AK courier and medic, K.I.A. during the Warsaw Uprising

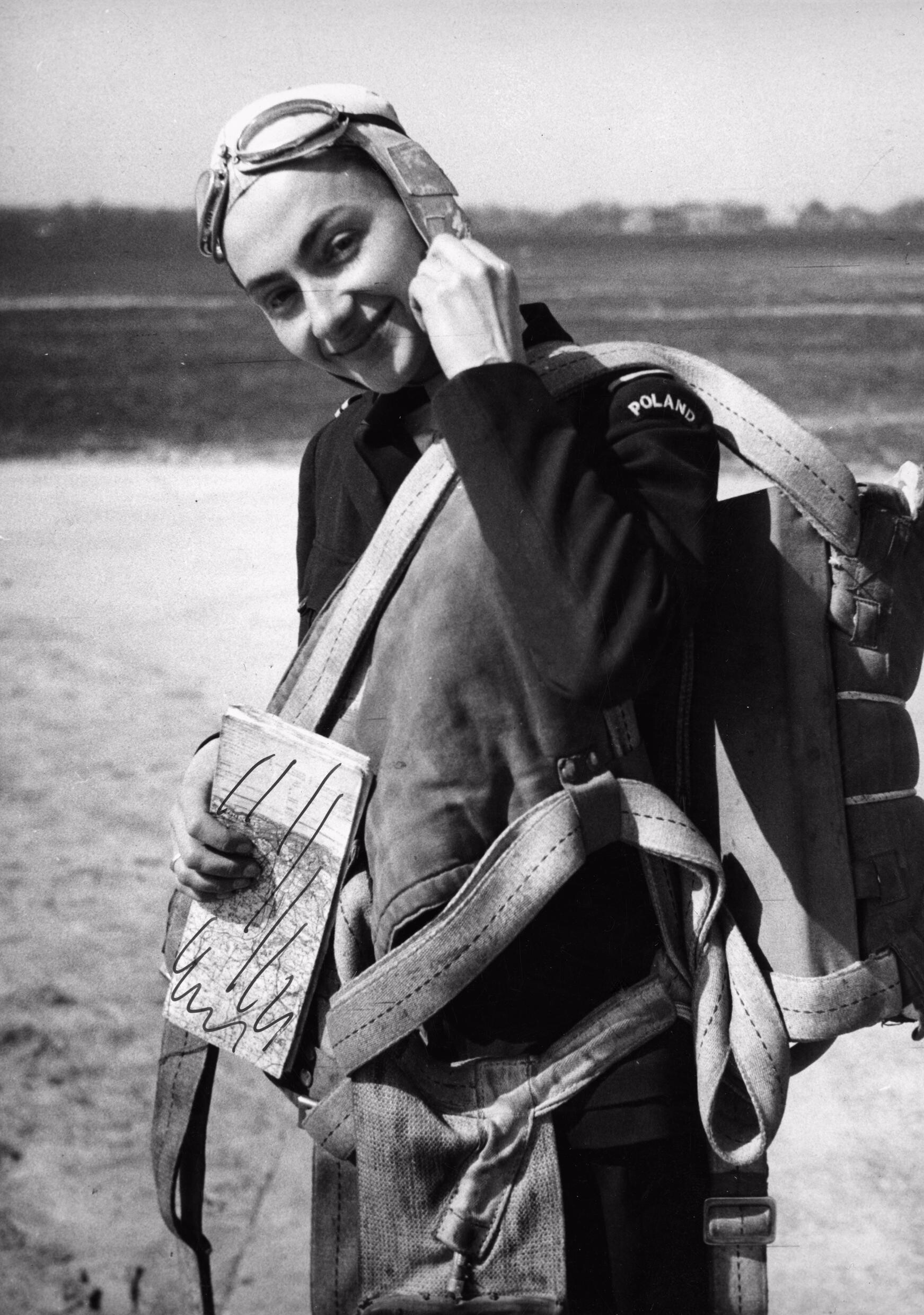
Stefania Wojtulanis-Karpińska, Captain in the Polish Air Forces in France and Great Britain

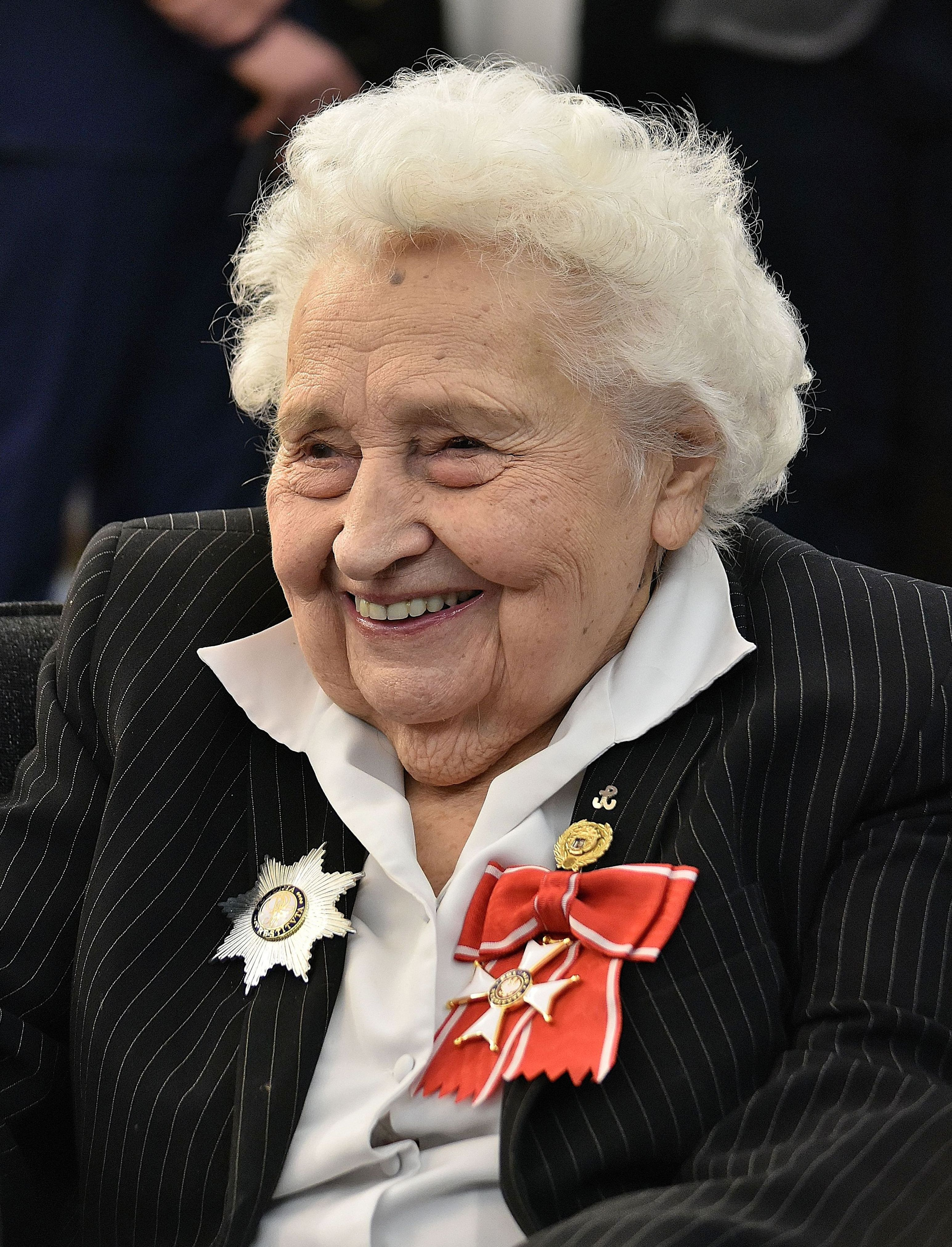
Maria Mirecka-Loryś, member of the WWII Polish resistance and the National Military Organization
- Joanna Żubr, during the Napoleonic Wars, was the first woman to be awarded the Order of Virtuti Militari.
- Józefa Rostkowska, pseud. Józef Kluczycki, née Mazurkiewicz, was a participant in the November Uprising, a medical assistant, and emigrated to France.
- Emilia Plater; during the November Uprising, she commanded an infantry unit with the rank of captain.
- Maria Piotrowiczowa; a participant in the January Uprising. She died in the Battle of Dobra.
- Anna Pustowójtówna, participant in the January Uprising and the Paris Commune
- Wanda Gertz, fought in both World Wars; she was awarded the Virtuti Militari and the Order of Polonia Restituta.
- Maria Wittek; the first woman to hold the rank of Brigadier General, she served in both World Wars.
- Elżbieta Zawacka, a courier during the underground resistance (1939–45) and a Cichociemna, holding the rank of Captain during the Warsaw Uprising; appointed Brigadier General in April 2006, becoming the second woman in Poland to attain this rank.
- Grażyna Lipińska, a participant in World War I, the Third Silesian Uprising, and World War II, who held the rank of Captain. Decorated with the Virtuti Militari, the Order of Polonia Restituta, and the Cross of Valor.
- Irena Tomalak; a active during both World Wars, in November 1939 she was the first courier to reach Budapest; she served the leadership of the Polish Underground State prior to their arrest by the NKVD and the subsequent Trial of the Sixteen. She held the rank of Major.
- Julia Halina Piwońska; an officer of the Polish Army and independence activist, she served in the Polish Military Organisation.
- Maria Vetulani de Nisau; an independence activist, member of the Polish Military Organization, participant in the Battle of Lemberg (1918), member of the Home Army during the German occupation, participant in the Warsaw Uprising, murdered by the Germans during the liquidation of insurgent hospitals, and twice awarded the Cross of Valor.
- Stefania Wojtulanis-Karpińska (nom de guerre "Barbara"); originally a sports pilot, she became a Captain Pilot in the Polish Air Forces in France and Great Britain. She was awarded the Order of the White Eagle, the Air Medal (four times), the Cross of Merit with Swords, the Silver Cross of Merit, the Cross of Combat Action of the Polish Armed Forces in the West, and the Medal for Participation in the Defensive War of 1939.
- Maria Mirecka-Loryś, a member of the Polish resistance in World War II and the National Military Organization, also a Commander in Chief of the Women's National Military Union. Awarded the Order of Polonia Restituta
  Cross of Merit, Partisan Cross, Armia Krajowa Cross, and Pro Patria Medal.

== See also ==
- Oflag IX-C
- Stalag IV-B
- Stalag VI-C
- Stalag IV-E
- Women in the military
