= Wanda Gertz =

Polish soldier and male impersonator (1896–1958)

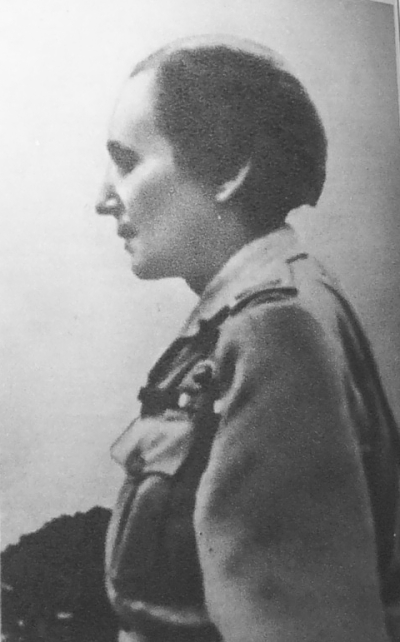
- Wanda Gertz
- Born: Wanda Gertz von Schliess; 13 April 1896; Warsaw, Congress Poland, Russian Empire
- Died: 10 November 1958 (aged 62); London, England
- Burial place: Powązki Military Cemetery, Warsaw, Poland; 52°15′30″N 20°57′11″E
- Military career
- Allegiance: Poland
- Branch: Polish Land Forces
- Service years: 1915–1921; 1939–1949
- Rank: Major
- Commands: II. Ochotnicza Legia Kobiet; Dywersja i Sabotaz Kobiet (Dysk)
- Conflicts: World War I (Brusilov Offensive); Polish–Soviet War; World War II (Warsaw Uprising)
- Awards: Virtuti Militari Silver Medal Polonia Restituta Knight's Cross Krzyz Niepodleglosci with Swords Krzyz Zaslugi

Major Wanda Gertz (13 April 1896 – 10 November 1958) was a Polish woman of noble birth, who began her military career in the Polish Legion during World War I, dressed as a man, under the pseudonym of "Kazimierz 'Kazik' Żuchowicz". She subsequently served in the Ochotnicza Legia Kobiet (Women's Voluntary Legion) of the Polish Armed Forces during the Polish–Soviet War. In the interwar period she became a reserve officer but faced discrimination and was stripped of her officer rank. She worked closely with Marshal Piłsudski and remained an activist in the cause of women in the military.

With the outbreak of World War II her experience and skills in Special operations were ultimately recognised by military men and having joined the resistance in 1939 under codename, "Lena", she became an officer and commander of an all-female battalion in the Home Army. She was awarded the highest Polish military honours, a singular rarity for any woman of her generation to achieve.

== Early life and background ==
She was born Wanda Gertz von Schliess in Warsaw, to Florentyna and Jan Gertz von Schliess. Her family originally came from Saxony, but had settled in the Commonwealth of Two Nations during the eighteenth century, while the House of Wettin occupied the Polish throne. Gertz's father fought in the January Uprising of 1863–64, and Gertz grew up hearing the stories of her father and his comrades. Years later she wrote:

As a five-year-old girl I had never had any dolls, only innumerable toy soldiers, which my older brother, his friends and I played with. Even then, I knew that high military rank was not for girls. My fondest dream was to become an officer. However, as a girl, I could only be a private.

In 1913, Gertz completed the Kuzienkowa Gymnasium in Warsaw. She then trained in Bookkeeping with the Warsaw Chamber of Commerce. While still at school she had joined the 4th, Emilia Plater troop of the then illegal Girl Guides. After the outbreak of World War I in 1914, she joined the Konfederacja Polska (Polish confederation), a national independence lobby organization. Gertz distributed political leaflets and made clothes for prisoners of war. She then joined the 4th Warsaw Battalion, but in August 1915 after the Battalion had been absorbed into the 1st Brigade of the Polish Legion, women were prohibited from serving on the front line.

== World War I ==
Having cut off her hair and dressed in men's clothing, Gertz presented herself at a recruitment office of the Polish Legion as, "Kazimierz Zuchowicz". All went well until the medical inspection. However, a sympathetic doctor promised to help, and she was assigned to serve as a medical orderly. After a few weeks "Kazik" was reassigned to an artillery unit, serving there for six months, and seeing action during the Brusilov Offensive. As she was a horse rider, she was able to serve in a signals platoon. After returning to Warsaw in 1917, following the Oath crisis, Gertz joined the women's branch of the clandestine Polish Military Organisation - Polska Organizacja Wojskowa.

On 8 December 1917 during a demonstration in Saviour Square - (Plac Zbawiciela) in Warsaw, Gertz was arrested and sentenced to six months in prison, but having paid bail, she was released after a few weeks. Upon release she worked as a courier, and was involved in disarming German troops in November 1918. In December 1918 Poland finally gained its independence, and Gertz joined the People's Militia, and was assigned to the Armaments Section in March 1919.

== Polish–Soviet War ==
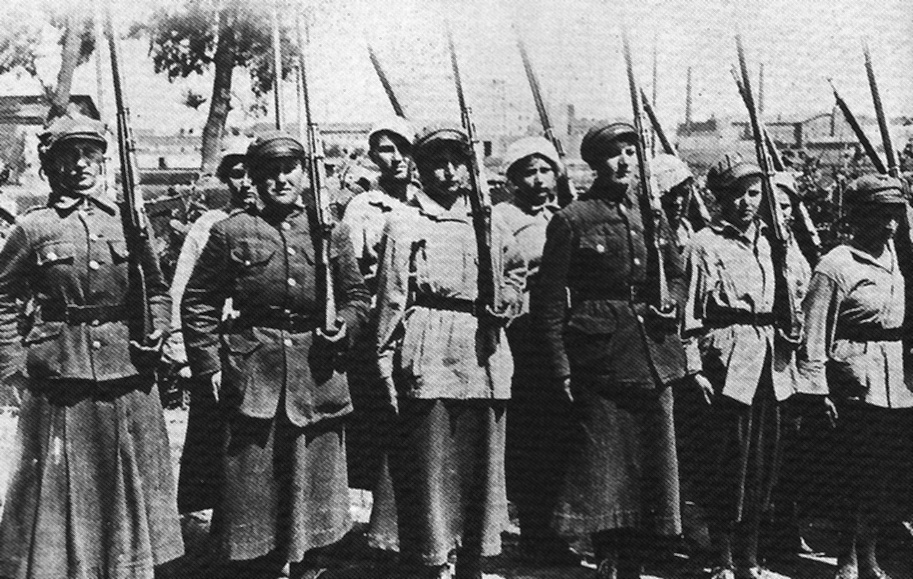
Women volunteer soldiers of the Polish Army in 1920.

In April 1919, soon after the outbreak of the Polish–Soviet War, Gertz enlisted in the Polish Army and was assigned to the 1st Lithuanian–Belarusian Division. In September 1919, she was appointed commander of the Ochotnicza Legia Kobiet - (2nd Women's Volunteer Legion) in Vilnius. The Women's Legions played an auxiliary role, usually engaged only in guard duties, but during the fighting for Vilnius, the 2nd Legion did see action at the front, helping to fight off the attacks of Hayk Bzhishkyan's Cavalry Corps. In the rank of lieutenant to which Gertz advanced in 1920, she was subsequently awarded the Virtuti Militari medal.

At the end of the war in 1921, Gertz was demobilized and moved to the reserve forces. In 1922 her rank of lieutenant was "removed" from her on the grounds that there was no basis in law for a woman in the Polish armed forces to hold an officer rank. She worked for an engineering enterprise, Koncern Maszynowy S.A. from 1923, and after the May Coup of 1926, she became Chef de Cabinet in the office of Józef Piłsudski who was then General Inspector of the Armed Forces. In 1928 Gertz became one of the first 13 members of the Przysposobienie Wojskowe Kobiet (Women's Military Training) where she served as an instructor. After Piłsudski's death in 1935, she co-founded the Belweder Museum, where she remained in a management role until September 1939. Her spare time was devoted to other military activities. In 1938 she became treasurer of the Federation of Polish Associations of the Defenders of the Homeland.

== World War II ==
Soon after the outbreak of World War II in September 1939, Gertz was one of the first women to join the resistance movement, Service for Poland's Victory (Służba Zwycięstwu Polski - SZP), operating under the code name "Lena". She organized clandestine communications, acted as courier, and was assistant to the divisional commander, Stanisław Kozarski. In April 1942 Gertz was ordered to create and command a new unit Dywersja i Sabotaż Kobiet - "oddział Dysk" (Women's Diversion and Sabotage unit), as part of the Kedyw. Its members carried out attacks on German military personnel, airfields, trains and bridges. Gertz seems to have been sceptical about the planned Warsaw Uprising, and prohibited members of her group from taking part, though many did so anyway. She was promoted to the rank of major in September 1944.

Captured after the Uprising, still known as Major Kazik, Gertz was held as a prisoner-of-war and recognised by the Germans as commandant of 2,000 other female fighters who had survived. She passed through camps at Ożarów, Lamsdorf and Mühlberg, and finally in late 1944 arrived at Molsdorf, all the while retaining command and respect among her fellow POWs. On 5 April 1945 the POWs of Molsdorf were marched to nearby Blankenhain before finally being liberated on 13 May 1945 by troops of the U.S. 89th Infantry Division.

== Post-war life ==
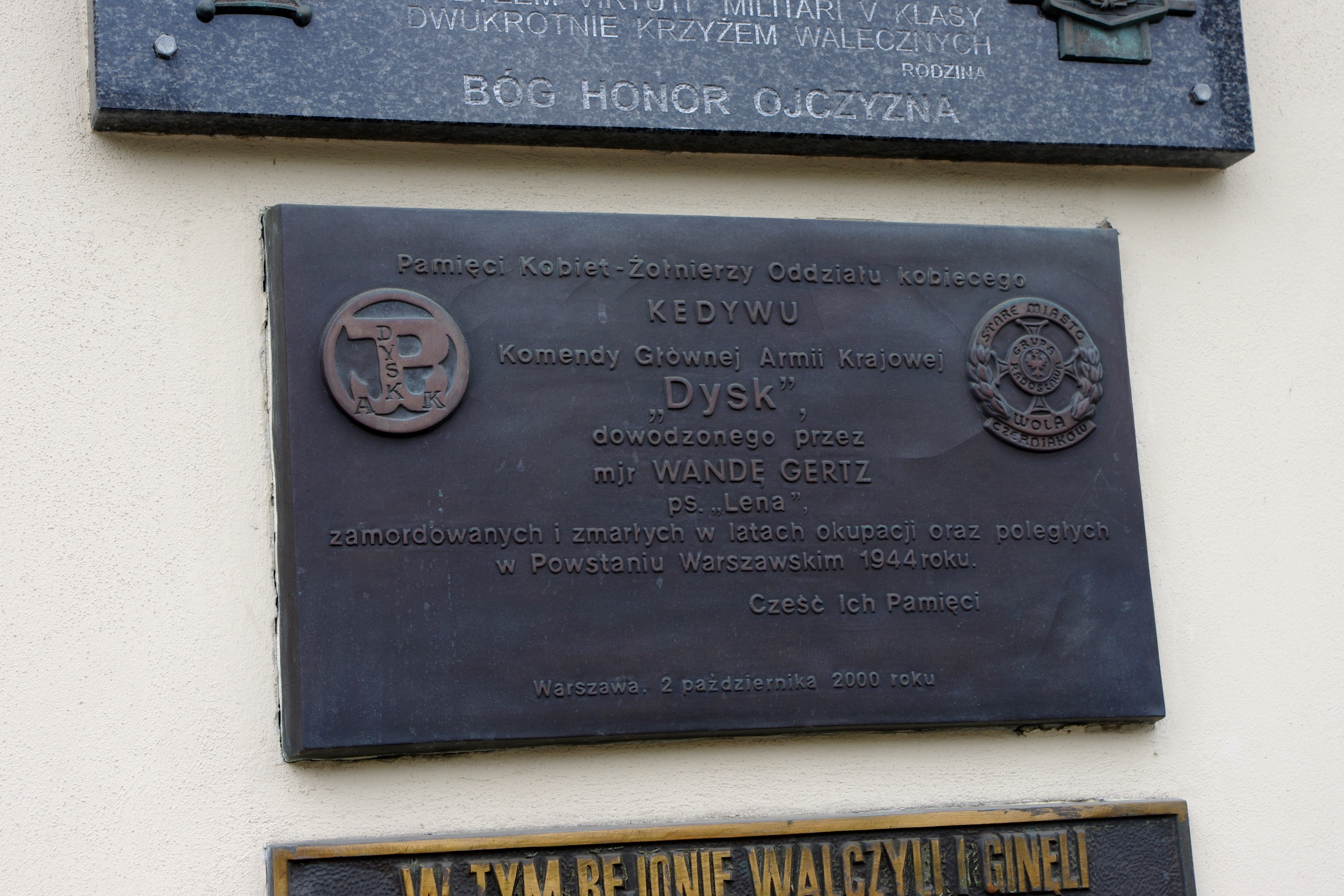
Plaque commemorating Wanda Gertz at the Church of John the Baptist, Warsaw.

As part of allied Polish forces in Germany under British command, Gertz arrived with them in the United Kingdom, returning to Europe after the German surrender to serve as Inspector for Women Home Army Soldiers. She travelled throughout Germany and Italy in search of displaced Polish women. From May 1946 until February 1949 she was part of the Polish Resettlement Corps, serving as Inspector of Women Soldiers in the north of England. Her task was to prepare them for civilian life in Britain. After demobilisation Gertz worked in a canteen until her death from cancer on 10 November 1958. Her funeral was attended by many veterans, including Aleksandra Piłsudska, and Generals Michał Karaszewicz-Tokarzewski and Tadeusz Bór-Komorowski. In 1959 her ashes were taken to Poland and interred at the Powązki Military Cemetery in Warsaw.

== Publications ==
- W pierwszym pułku artylerii - Służba Ojczyźnie - "In the first regiment of artillery - service to the fatherland", Warsaw, 1929

== Awards ==
- Silver Cross of the Virtuti Militari
- Knight's Cross of the Order of Polonia Restituta (Krzyż Kawalerski Orderu Odrodzenia Polski), awarded posthumously
- Cross of Valour - Krzyż Walecznych, five times, the first time in 1921
- Cross of Independence - Krzyż Niepodległości, with Swords
- Gold Cross of Merit with Swords - Krzyż Zasługi z Mieczami

== See also ==
- History of Poland during World War I
- Polish resistance movement in World War II
- Women in World War II
- Women's roles in the World Wars
- Kedyw
