= Women in the world wars =

Aspect of women's history

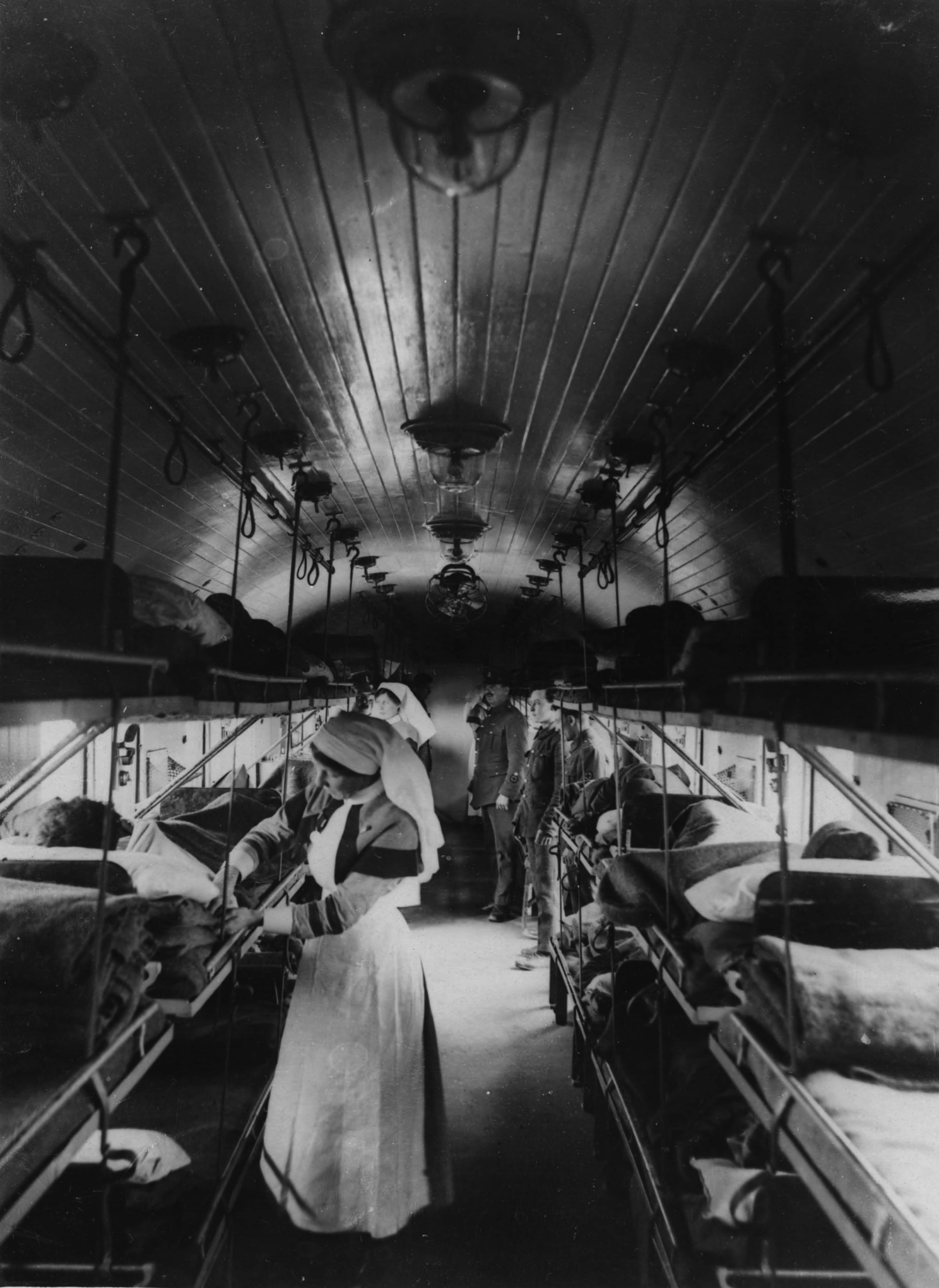
David McLellan - Interior of a ward on a British Ambulance Train in France during World War I

During both world wars, women were required to undertake new roles in their respective national war efforts. Women across the world experienced severe setbacks as well as considerable societal progress during this timeframe. The two world wars hinged as much on industrial production as they did on battlefield clashes. While some women managed to enter the traditionally male career paths, women, for the most part, were expected to be primarily involved in "duties at home" and "women's work," especially after the wars were over. On the other hand, the two wars also victimized women and subjected them to numerous incidences of sexual violence, abuse, and death.

During World War I, women in the Western world, including Europe, Canada, and the United States, contributed to the war efforts on both the home fronts and the battlefields. Women's employment rates skyrocketed in domestic and industrial sectors. Nursing became one of the most popular professions in military employment during these years. In Asia, women's labor in the cotton and silk industries became essential for the economy. Before 1914, few countries, including New Zealand, Australia, and several Scandinavian nations, had given women the right to vote (see Women's suffrage). Still, otherwise, women were minimally involved in the political process. Women's participation in WWI fostered the support and development of the suffrage movement, including in the United States.

During the Second World War, women's contributions to industrial labor in factories located on the home front kept society and the military running while the world was in chaos. Women in the Western World also gained more opportunities to serve directly in their country's armed forces, which they had limited opportunities to do in WWI. At the same time, women faced a significant amount of abuse during this time; the Japanese military systematically raped women across Asia, and Jewish women were physically abused, raped, and murdered in German concentration camps across Europe.

The participation of women in the world wars catalyzed the later recruitment of women in many countries' armed forces. Women's involvement in these wartime efforts exposed their commitment to serving their country and preserving national security and identity.

Black women in particular were drawn to factory jobs in larger numbers due to the labor shortages. They worked as welders, riveters, and machine operators, and were key to the production of tanks, planes, and ships. Many of these jobs had traditionally been occupied by white men, but the demand for labor during wartime opened doors for women of all races.

The war years opened new job categories and promoted some mobility for Black women. For example, many migrated from the rural South to urban areas to work in factories. Between 1940 and 1944, the proportion of Black women in domestic service and farm work decreased significantly as they moved into industrial jobs, with the number of Black women in industrial occupations rising from 6.5% to 18%.

== World War I ==
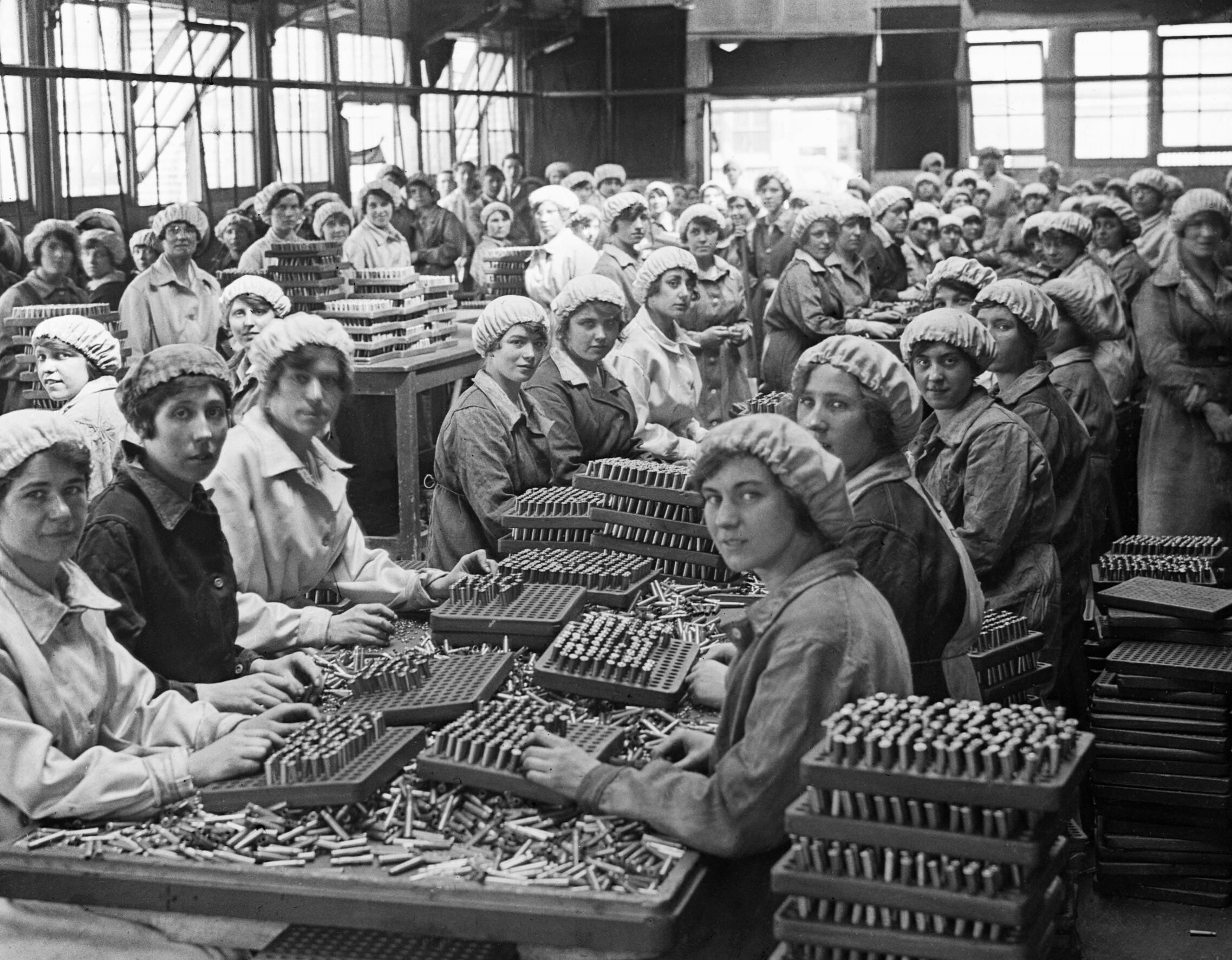
Munitionettes working at Woolwich Arsenal, London, May 1918. By June 1917, roughly 80% of the weaponry and ammunition used by the British army during World War I was being made by munitionettes.

=== Europe ===
In Great Britain just before World War I, there were 24 million adult women, and 1.7 million worked in domestic service, 200,000 worked in the textile manufacturing industry, 600,000 worked in the clothing trades, 500,000 worked in commerce, and 260,000 worked in local and national government, including teaching. The British textile and clothing trades, in particular, employed far more women than men and were regarded as 'women's work.' By 1914 nearly. 5.09 million out of the 23.8 million women in Britain were working. Thousands worked in munitions factories (see Canary Girl, Gretna Girls), offices, and large hangars to build aircraft. Women were also involved in knitting socks for the soldiers on the front, as well as other voluntary work, but as a matter of survival, women had to work for paid employment for the sake of their families. Many women worked as volunteers serving at the Red Cross, encouraged the sale of war bonds, or planted "victory gardens."

The First World War allowed women in Great Britain to participate in the workforce, including assembly lines. In Great Britain, this was known as a process of "Dilution" and was strongly contested by the trade unions, particularly in the engineering and shipbuilding industries. For the duration of both world wars, women sometimes did take on skilled "men's work." However, by the agreement negotiated with the trade unions, women undertaking jobs covered by the Dilution agreement lost their jobs at the end of the First World War.

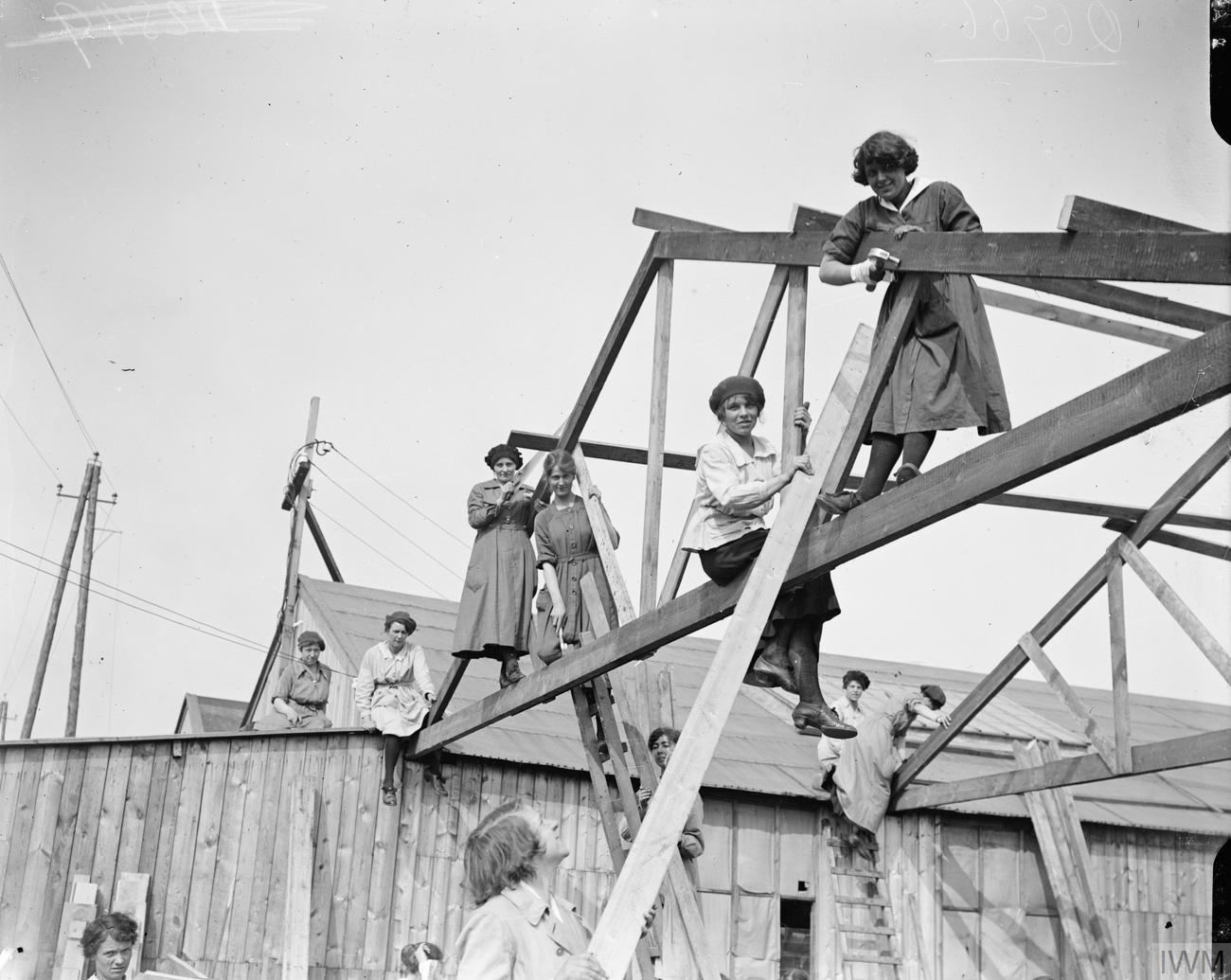
Women carpenters in France, June 1918

Although women were still paid less than men in the workforce, pay inequalities were starting to diminish as women were now getting paid two-thirds of the typical pay for men, a 28% increase. However, the extent of this change is open to historical debate. In part because of female participation in the war effort, Canada, the United States, Great Britain, and several European countries extended suffrage to women in the years after the First World War.

British historians no longer emphasize the granting of woman suffrage as a reward for women's participation in war work. Historian Martin D. Pugh argues that senior politicians primarily determined women's suffrage. The suffragettes had been weakened, Pugh argues, by repeated failures before 1914 and by the disorganizing effects of war mobilization; therefore, they quietly accepted these age-related restrictions, which were approved in 1918 by a majority of the War Ministry and each political party in Parliament. More generally, G. R. Searle (2004) argues that the British debate was essentially over by the 1890s and that granting suffrage in 1918 was primarily a byproduct of voting for male soldiers. Women in Britain finally achieved suffrage on the same terms as men in 1928.

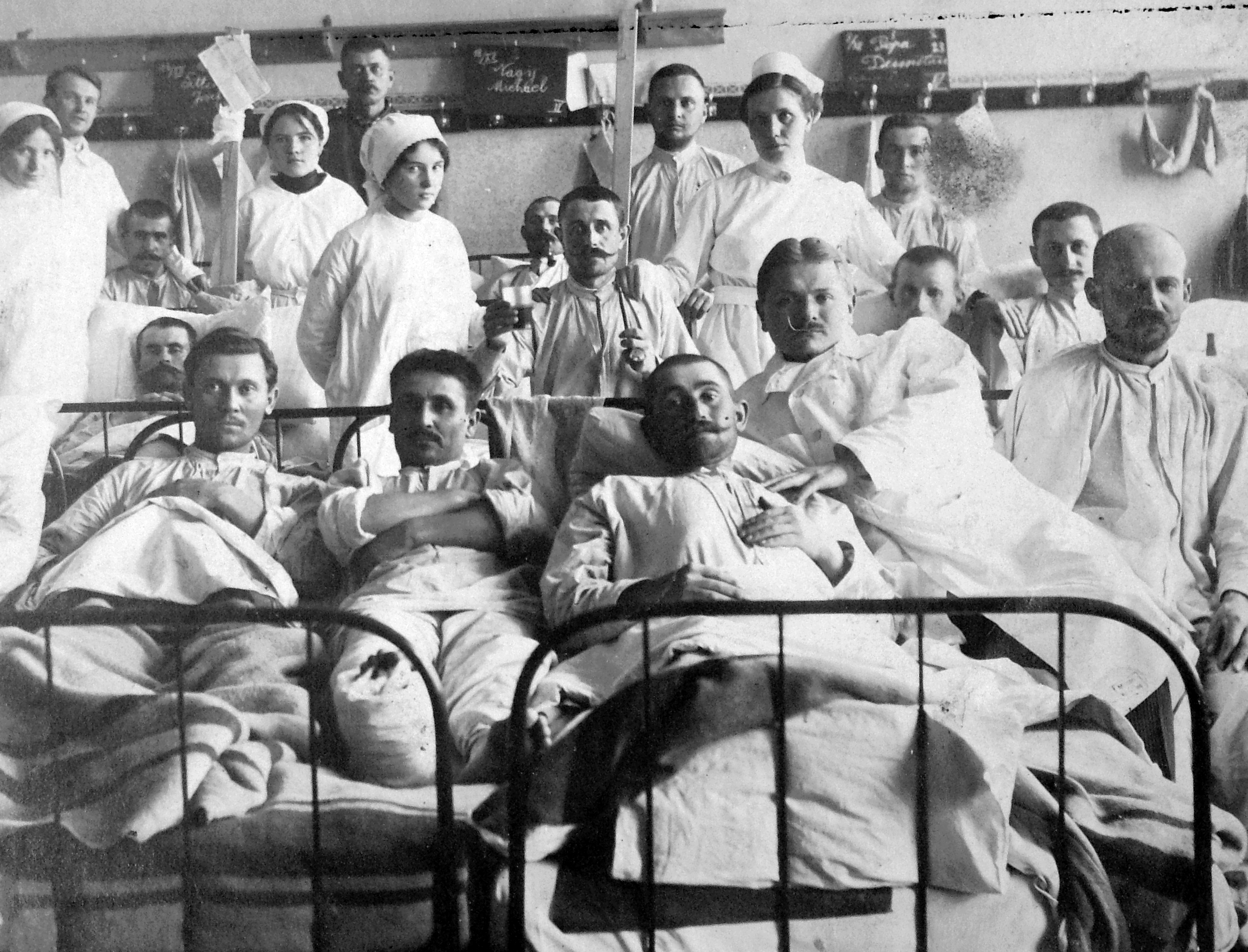
Nurses and wounded soldiers in an Austro-Hungarian military hospital, 1918

Nursing became almost the only area of female contribution that involved being at the front and experiencing the war. In Britain, Queen Alexandra's Royal Army Nursing Corps, First Aid Nursing Yeomanry, and Voluntary Aid Detachment started before World War I. The VADs were not allowed in the front line until 1915.

`In other European countries, such as in the 1918 Finnish Civil War, more than 2,000 women fought in the paramilitary Women's Red Guards. The only belligerent to deploy female combat troops in substantial numbers was the Russian Provisional Government in 1917. Its few "Women's Battalions" fought well but failed to provide the expected propaganda value and were disbanded before the end of the year. In the later Russian Civil War, the Bolsheviks employed women infantry.

Women living in present-day Slovakia, under the rule of the Habsburg monarchy at the time of the First World War, only sometimes upheld the pro-war attitude that dominated central Europe. Furthermore, their dissenting attitudes towards war heightened, especially when members of their own families, such as their husbands, were conscripted into the army. Women expressed their disapproval by creating feminist organizations such as the Hungarian Feminist's Association to encourage pacifism. Habsburg monarchy women also expressed their disapproval through public protestation.

=== United States ===
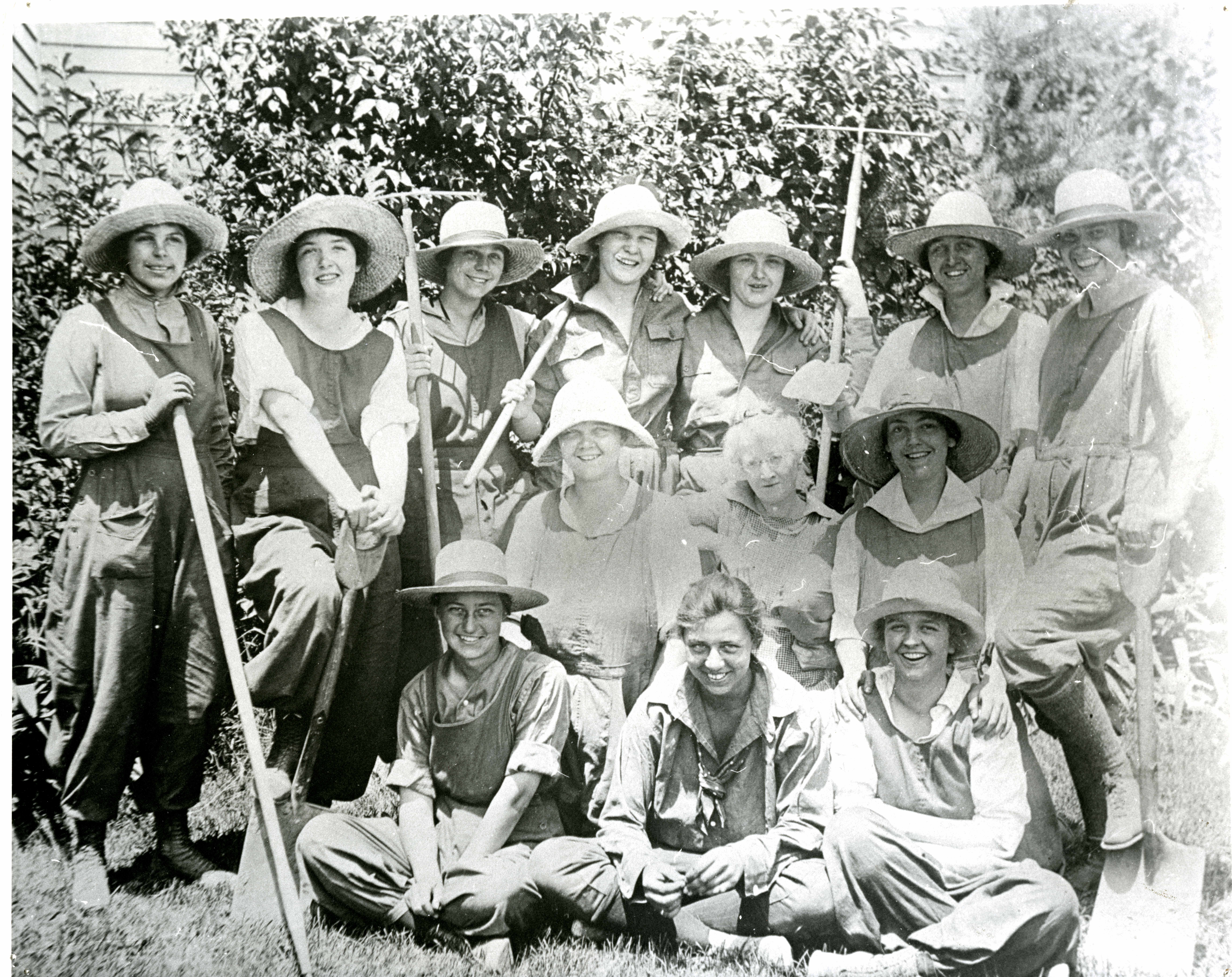
A unit of thirteen Connecticut College students pose in their worker's uniforms in 1917. During World War I, they worked as farmerettes.

The involvement of women in World War I played a vital role in the U.S.’s victory. They filled in the jobs the men left behind to fight in the war. Women did not physically fight in combat, but their contribution consisted of behind-the-scenes work at home, raising money, and working to keep the country up and running. Without the efforts of women, tens of thousands of men needed at the front would have been tied to jobs in agriculture, industry, and home-front military and not available for wartime service, and the success of America's military effort may have been in the balance. Every housewife in the U.S. was asked to sign a pledge card that had to food and assignments completed.

Thousands of women in the United States formed and/or joined organizations that worked to bring relief to the war-torn countries in Europe, even before official American entry into the war in April 1917. Everyone contributed to the efforts of the war regardless of their social class. Upper-class women were the primary founders and members of voluntary wartime organizations, mainly because they could afford to devote much of their time and money to these efforts. Middle- and lower-class women also participated in these organizations and drives, although they were more likely to serve as nurses in the military or replace men in their jobs on the home front as the men went off to war. For the first time in American history, women from every part of the class spectrum were serving in the war in some capacity.

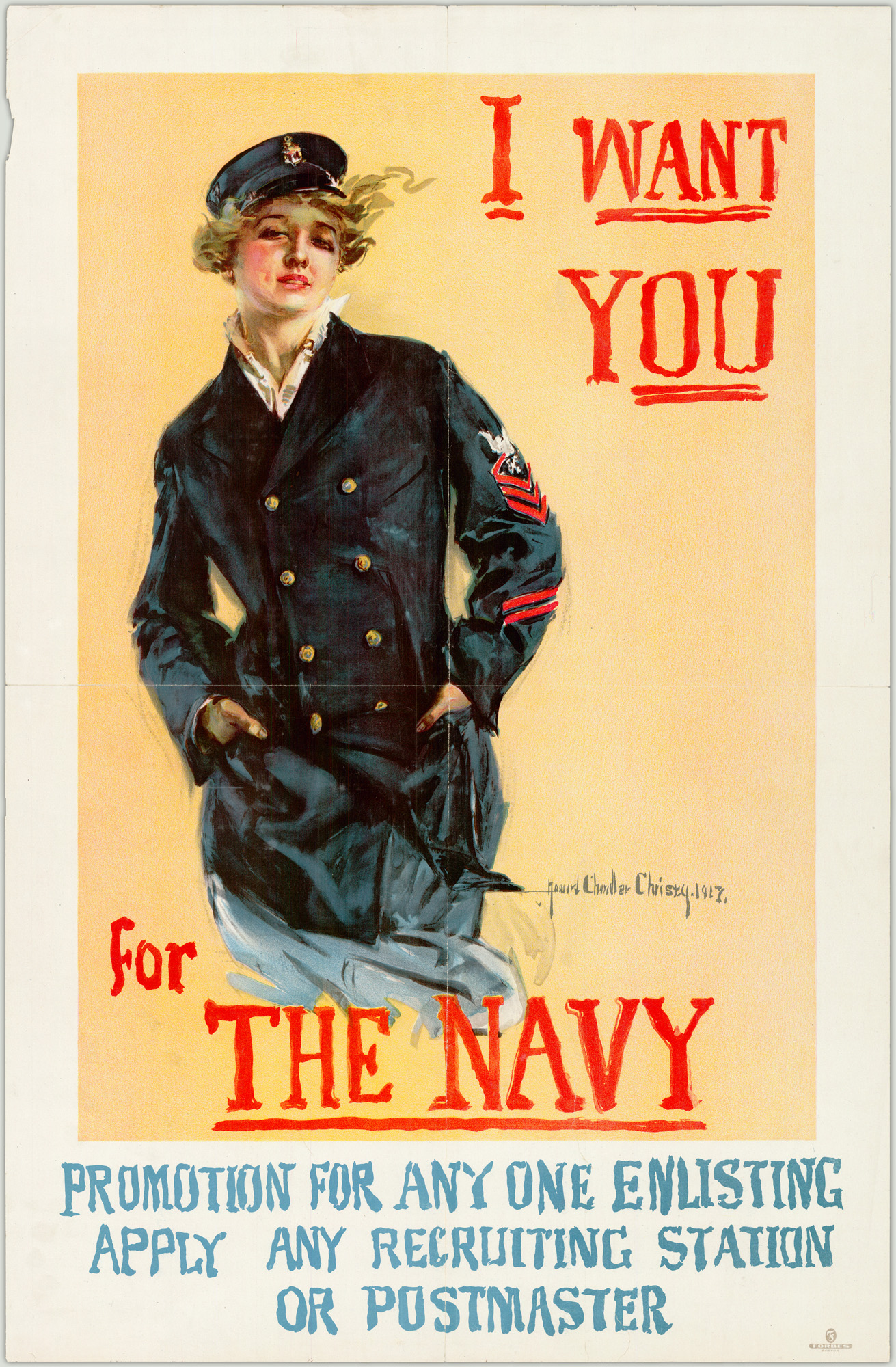
The United States Navy began accepting women for enlisted service during World War I

There were many tasks and jobs that the women did that went unaccounted for in history because they mainly focused on the contribution of the men in the war. Women in World War I revealed the vast jobs that they did, such as enlisting in the navy, army, and factory jobs. They became members of the social welfare program entitled the American Red Cross. They assigned duties that would help out the soldiers that were overseas, such as organizing bloods drives, giving vaccinations, and packaging food. Women worked locally within their state by aiding traveling soldiers and raising money to support the war efforts. Furthermore, women serving for the American Red Cross also had the opportunity to serve in Europe, where the war was mostly taking place. Abroad, these women worked as nurses, recreational volunteers, chemists, and more.Over 12,000 women were enlisted in auxiliary roles in the United States Navy and Marine Corps during the First World War. About 400 of them died in that war.

One of the key ways Black women contributed to the war effort was through their involvement in organizations like the National Association of Colored Women's Clubs (NACW). Under the leadership of figures like Mary B. Talbert, the NACW promoted wartime patriotism while also addressing the issues of racial injustice that plagued Black communities. Talbert herself urged African American women to engage in food conservation, Red Cross work, and other forms of civic participation, blending the responsibilities of the home with broader political activism. The NACW's focus on the war's impact on Black women and families was a departure from the often male-dominated discourse around Black political involvement, allowing these women to assert their political voice in new and powerful ways.

=== Asia ===
Thousands of migrants came from Asia to Europe during WWI in order to assist with the war efforts in Great Britain, with approximately 92,000 war workers coming from China alone. European powers relied on a male labor force in winning the war, thus leaving families divided at home.

In the years leading up to the First World War, the cotton and silk industries grew exponentially in Japan. More than 80% of Japanese female citizens worked in these textile industries during and nearing the end of WWI. Their working conditions were poor, as the female employees were subjected to malnutrition and serious illnesses such as tuberculosis while living together in unsanitary dormitories.

=== Canada ===
Over 2,800 women served with the Royal Canadian Army Medical Corps during the First World War and it was during that era that the role of Canadian women in the military first extended beyond nursing. Women were given paramilitary training in small arms, drill, first aid and vehicle maintenance in case they were needed as home guards. Forty-three women in the Canadian military died during WWI.

== World War II ==
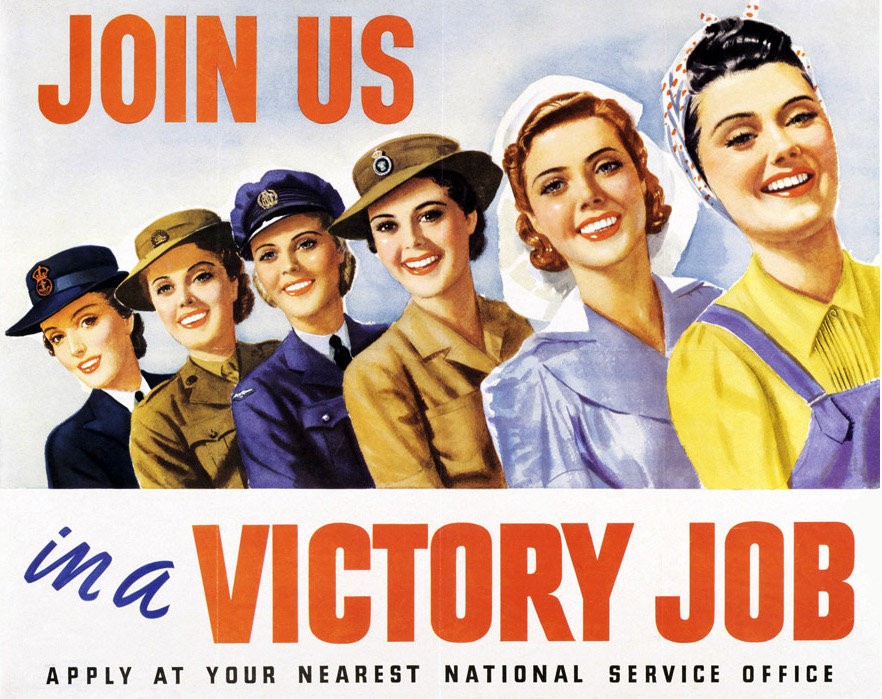
In many nations women were encouraged to join female branches of the armed forces or participate in industrial or farm work.

=== The United States ===
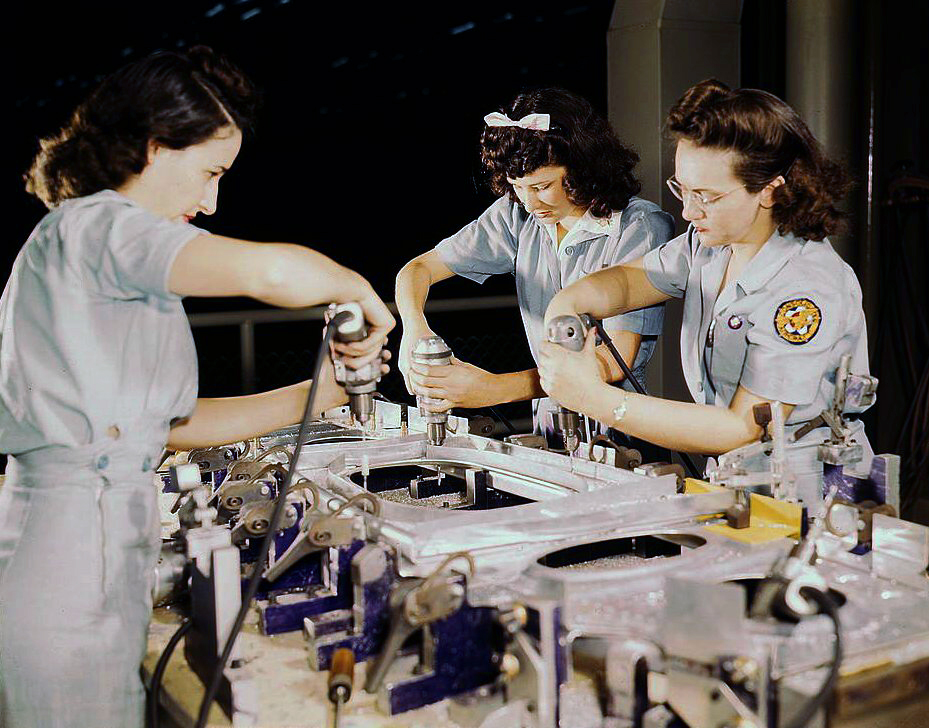
A wing bulkhead being drilled at Consolidated Aircraft Corporation in Texas, October 1942

During WWII, 6 million women were added to the workforce, resulting in a major cultural shift. With the men fighting in the wars, women were needed to take on responsibilities that the men had to leave behind.

Women in World War II took on various roles from country to country. World War II involved global conflict on an unprecedented scale; the absolute urgency of mobilizing the entire population made the expansion of the role of women inevitable. Rosie the Riveter became an emblem of women's dedication to traditional male labor.

With this expanded horizon of opportunity and confidence and the extended skill base that many women could now give to paid and voluntary employment, women's roles in World War II were even more extensive than in the First World War. By 1945, more than 2.2 million women worked in war industries, especially in munitions plants. They participated in building ships, aircraft, vehicles, and weaponry. Women also worked on farms, drove trucks, provided logistic support for soldiers, and entered professional areas of work that were previously the preserve of men.

During World War II, over 150,000 American women had served in the WAVES (the Navy) and the Women's Auxiliary Army Corps. According to historian D’Ann Campbell, “Between 1942 and 1945, 140,000 women served in the WACs, 100,000 in the WAVES, 23,000 in the Marines, 13,000 in the SPARS, and 74,000 in the Army and Navy Nurse Corps”. Women became officially recognized as a permanent part of the U.S. armed forces after the war with the passing of the Women's Armed Services Integration Act of 1948.

Out of one million African Americans serving in WWII, 600,000 of them were women. Four thousand women served in the Women's Army Corps, and 330 served as nurses. African-American women fought for African-American rights through media, social activism, etc. A person's race was heavily divided, and in the year 1943, there were a documented 242 violent events against African Americans regardless of whether they served in the war effort or not.

The media representation of their efforts, such as the film The Six Triple Eight, highlights the bravery and dedication of the Black WACs, whose contributions were often overlooked in mainstream narratives. Their service during WWII not only shaped the course of the war but also paved the way for future generations of Black women in both military and civilian careers.

The Second World War also expanded labor employment opportunities for black women across the United States. Specifically, industrial labor became more common among black females, as black female employment in the industrial sector increased by 11.5% during this time. Nearing the end of the war, black females working in industrial occupations were the first to be fired from their jobs; as a result, they then turned to professions such as maids or laundry pressers.

=== Europe ===
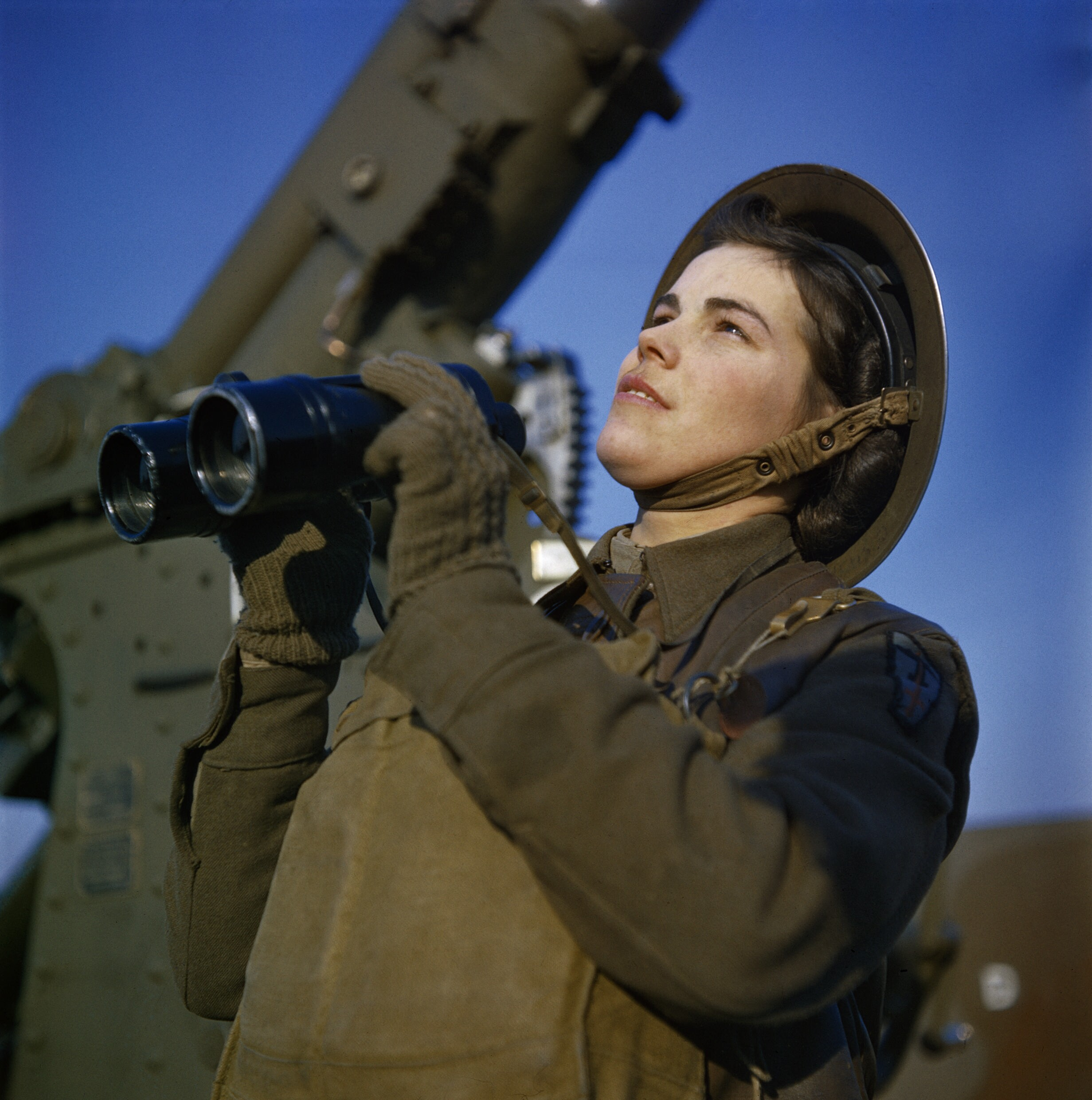
A British Auxiliary Territorial Service (ATS) spotter with binoculars at an anti-aircraft command post (December 1942).

Several hundred thousand women in European countries served in combat roles, especially in anti-aircraft units. Many women served in the major government organizations such as the OSS. These operations were mainly used as counterintelligence and spying sorts of activity. Such is the case in Operation Sauerkraut, where women were used in Allied POW camps to convert German and Czech POWs into Allied propaganda machines and then would be sent back over the lines and into Germany.

Women were used quite frequently in many roles during and in the French Resistance towards Nazi oppression with roughly 12% of all resistance fighters being women.

The French Forces of the Interior (FFI) began to see the importance of using women during the war and thus many gender roles and standards were dropped to accompany these new demands for participants in the resistance. These women then began to take on the same jobs and roles as French men such as scouting out German troops and movements, helping to guide Allied troops, and even helping to sweep out any remaining Germans from captured or Allied-occupied towns and regions.

Women in groups such as the Office of Strategic Services (OSS) also helped aid the resistance fighters by supplying firearms, ammunition, and other important resources to the cause and resistance. United States groups supplied many of these resources such as small pistols known as the "liberator" which was pocketable and easy to conceal in a purse or coat. Resistance women used these to great success in taking out German troops in heavily occupied cities and towns in order to gain more German resources for resistance use.

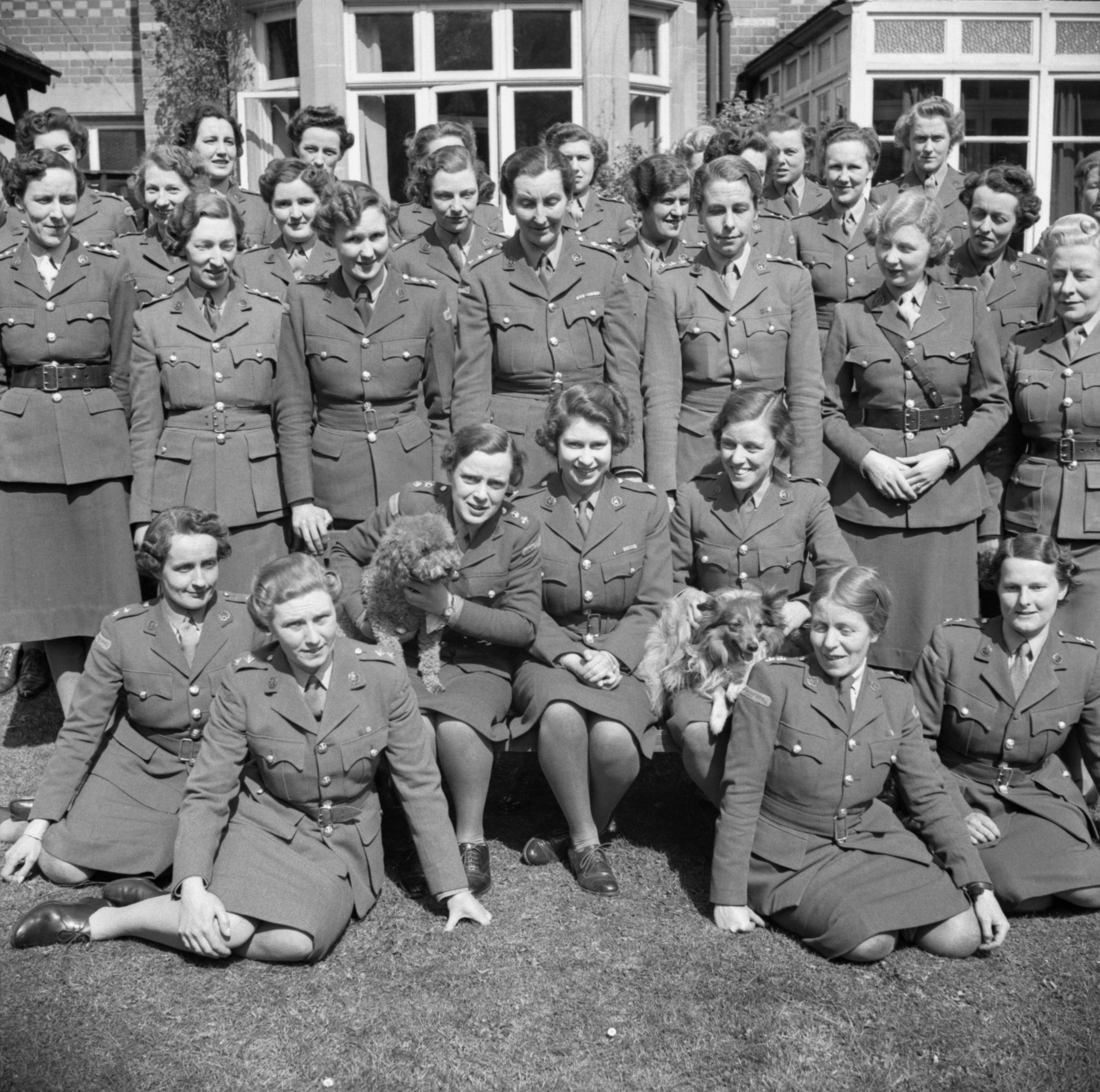
Princess Elizabeth served in the British Army, during the 1940s, while her father was king.

Germany had presented an ideal female role at home, but the urgent need for war production led to the hiring of millions of German women for factory and office work. Even so, the Nazi regime declared the role of women in German society to strictly fall along the lines of motherhood. Yet, the role of motherhood was only offered to white, German blooded women because the Nazi regime promoted the sterilization of women for “reasons of racial hygiene”.

Jewish women were encouraged to obtain an abortion in order to limit the increase of Jewish genetics, and a series of mass sterilizations occurred in Nazi concentration camps. Beyond mass sterilizations, women in concentration camps across Europe in the Second World War experienced sexual violence and abuse by many SS guards, though the notion that the camps fostered a systematic rape of its prisoners has not been affirmed by scholars. While other women were able to obtain jobs and new opportunities in other parts of the world during this time period, this was not the case for a majority of Jewish and even Gypsy women in Europe.

The Nazis murdered millions of Jewish women in the Holocaust, as well as women who belonged to other groups they were committing genocide against, such as women with disabilities and Roma women.

=== Asia ===
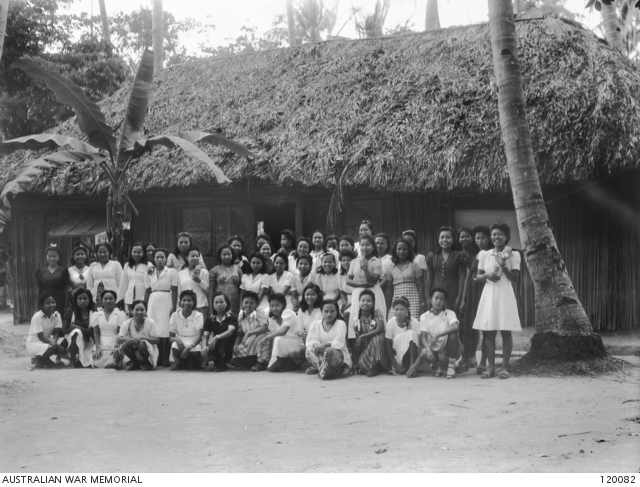
Javanese girls liberated by Australian troops from a Japanese brothel in Koepang, Timor, 2 October 1945

Women, called comfort women, were forced into sexual slavery by the Imperial Japanese Army before and during World War II. In other words, the comfort women were a part of a systematic rape used by Japan, especially among the armed forces in the Second World War. Korean women were especially used. The Japanese Imperial Army based these women within “Comfort Stations” near the battlefields in order to have sex with them. Aging from eleven to twenty years old, the comfort women were kidnapped from their homes in order to serve the Japanese army. In March 1932, it became known by a high ranking man in the Japanese military named Okamura Yasuji, that there were numerous rapes committed by Japanese military personnel in Shanghai. Okamura Yasuji ordered Okabe Naosaburo, a senior member of the Japanese military, to create comfort stations with the idea that it would help prevent Japanese soldiers from raping civilians. The other justification for comfort stations was to prevent people in the Japanese army from contracting sexually transmitted diseases. In recent years, political elites in Japanese society have denied the systematic rape of the comfort women during the World War II period, including former Japanese Prime Minister Abe. Despite recent controversy over this topic in Japanese politics and education, numerous researchers have proven that Japanese Comfort Women were subjected to sexual slavery and should be recognized for their unjust treatment.

=== Australia ===
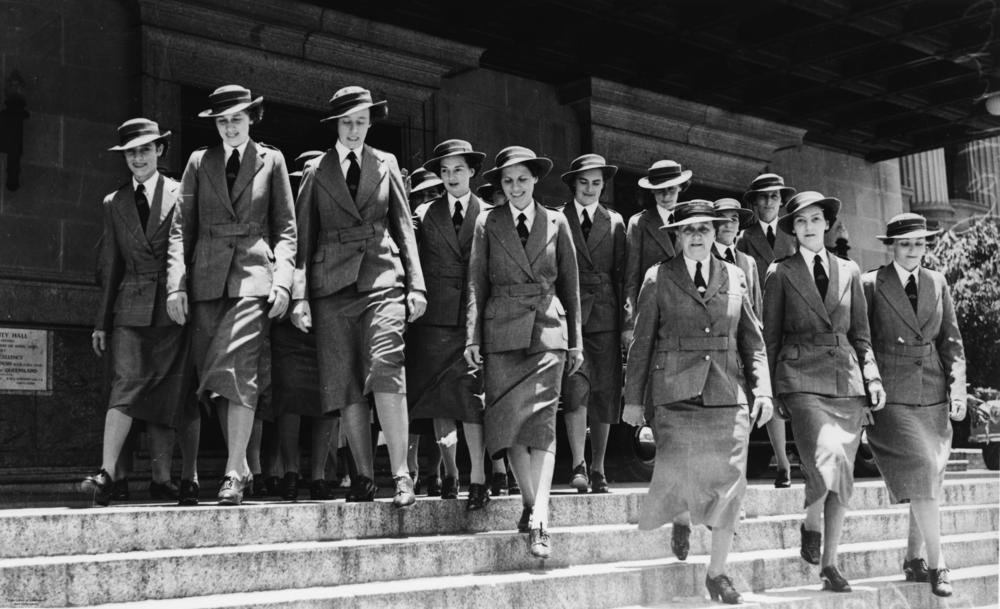
AANS nurses in Brisbane during 1940

Australian women during World War II played a larger role than they had during The First World War, when they primarily served as nurses and additional homefront workers. Many women wanted to play an active role in the war, and hundreds of voluntary women's auxiliary and paramilitary organisations had been formed by 1940. A shortage of male recruits forced the military to establish female branches in 1941 and 1942. Women entered roles which had traditionally been limited to men, but continued to receive lower wages.

=== Canada ===
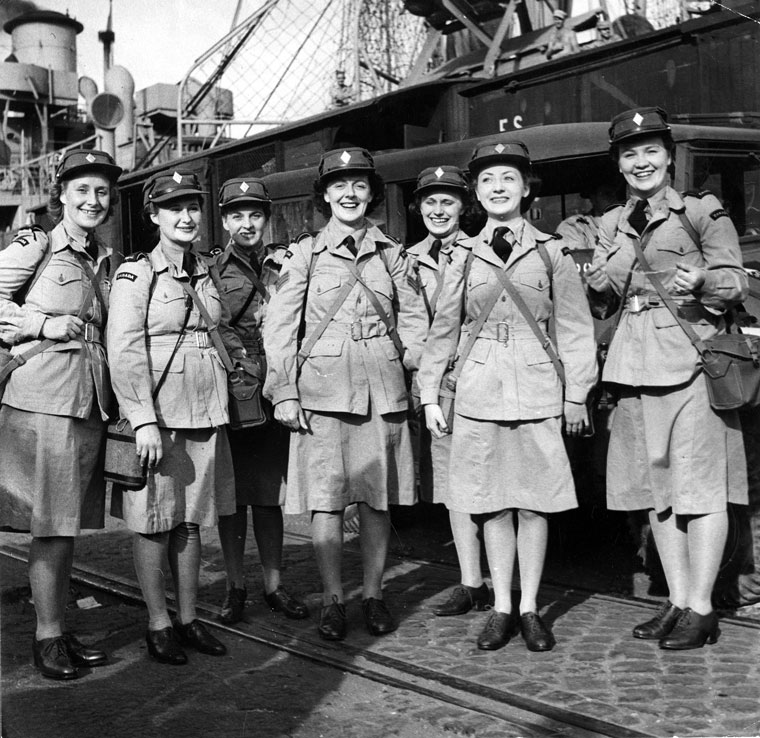
Members of the Canadian Women's Army Corps in August 1944

Canadian women in the world wars became indispensable because these were total wars that required the maximum effort from the civilian population. Canadian women participated in many ways to contribute to the war efforts. Many Canadian women did volunteer work to help raise money to help those affected by the war. The money raised by Canadian women was used to help refugees that came over with little to nothing. Canadian women also went out of their way to buy things with money they raised like a scarf or a tooth brush that they could send to troops to help them while they were overseas. It was because of the hard volunteer work that many Canadian women had chosen to take on that would lead to the federal government creating the Department of National War Services in June 1940 and then eventually a women's division was added a year later in the fall of 1941 to help with the workload of about fifty organizations. Many women who came from high schools gave up their summer vacations to work the agricultural fields due to a rising shortage of male labor workers. There were also many Canadian Jewish women that had served in World War II. In fact, there were about 50,000 Canadian Jewish women that served in the Canadian military during World War II. Many Canadian Jewish women who enlisted into the military had served in all branches of the military. Some were even stationed overseas. Most Canadian Jewish women who enlisted served at least 2 and a half years in the military. The Canadian Jewish women who served in the military typically had non-combative positions in the military. Some Canadian Jewish women did office work in the military and others did medical work for the military to help the wounded. Historians debate whether there was much long-term impact on the postwar roles of women.

== See also ==
- Air Transport Auxiliary (UK)
- Australian Women's Army Service (World War II)
- Australian Women's Land Army
- Canadian Women's Army Corps – known as "CWACs"
- Dorothy Lawrence – British reporter who posed as a man in the First World War
- Female guards in Nazi concentration camps
- First Aid Nursing Yeomanry (UK) – known as "FANYs"
- Himeyuri Students
- Women in the military#History
- List of uprisings led by women
- Ochotnicza Legia Kobiet (Poland, 1918), and the later Przysposobienie Wojskowe Kobiet (1920s-1930s)
- Queen Mary's Army Auxiliary Corps
- Soviet women in World War II
- SPARS (U.S. Navy)
- White feather
- Wojskowa Służba Kobiet of the Polish resistance, the Home Army
- Women Accepted for Volunteer Emergency Service (USA) – known as "WAVES"
- Women Airforce Service Pilots (USA) – known as "WASPs"
- Women in the Russian and Soviet military
- Women's Army Corps (USA) – known as "WACs"
- Women's Auxiliary Air Force (UK)
- Women's Auxiliary Service (Poland) – its members known as "Pestki" (after PSK, Pomocnicza Służba Kobiet)
- Women's Auxiliary Territorial Service (UK) (in which Princess Elizabeth, later Queen Elizabeth II, was enlisted)
- Women's Land Army (UK) – known as "Land girls"
- Woman's Land Army of America
- Women's Royal Army Corps (UK)
- Women's Royal Australian Naval Service (Australia) – known as "WRANS"
- Women's Royal Canadian Naval Service (Canada) – also known as "Wrens"
- Women's Royal Naval Service (UK) – known as "Wrens"
- Wrens at Bletchley Park
