= Voluntary Legion of Women =

Ochotnicza Legia Kobiet
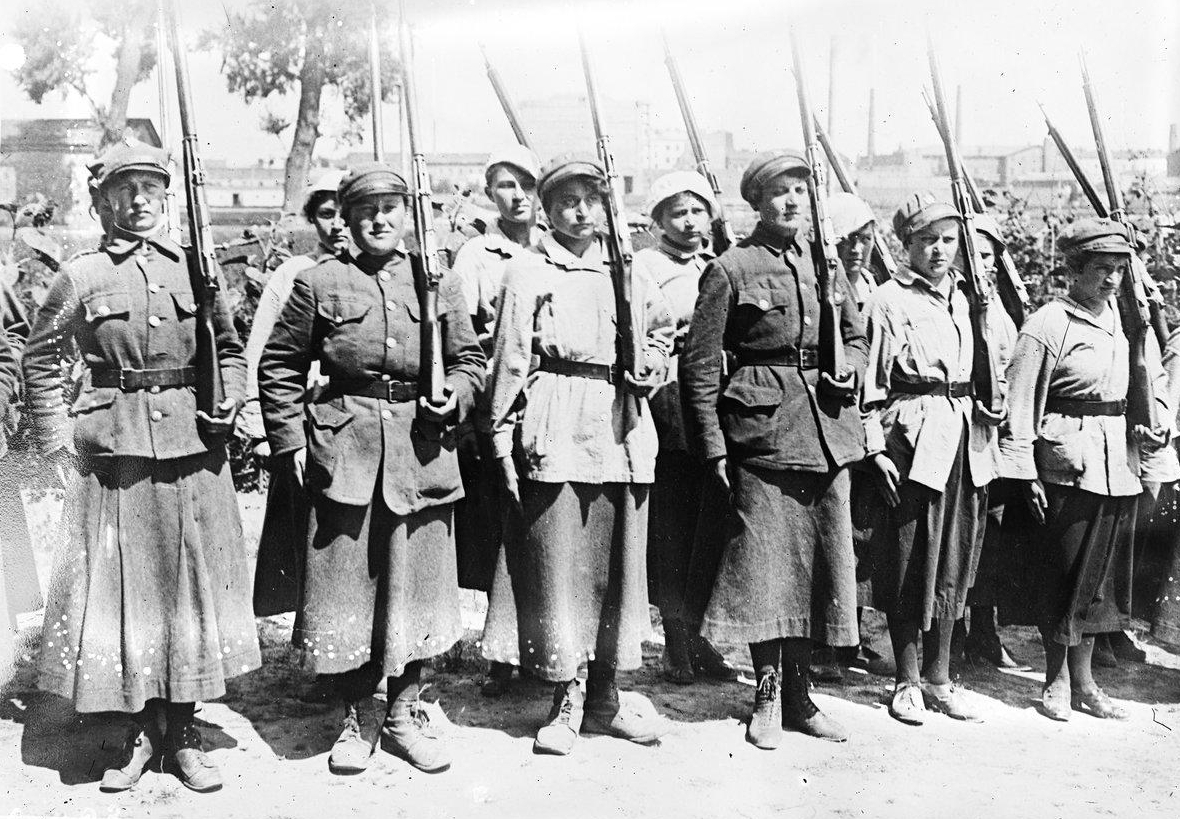
- Active: 1918–1923
- Country: Poland
- Branch: Polish Army
- Type: Auxiliary Infantry
- Size: 2,500
- Engagements: Polish–Ukrainian War; Polish-Soviet War

Commanders
- Notable commanders: Aleksandra Zagórska

Voluntary Legion of Women (Polish: Ochotnicza Legia Kobiet (OLK)) was a voluntary Polish paramilitary organization, created by women in Lviv in late 1918. At that time possession of the city was contested by the Poles and Ukrainians, and women decided to assist the Polish soldiers in all possible ways, including fighting on the front line.

Creation of the Legion, as this was original name of the organization, is attributed to Major Aleksandra Zagórska, who was the commander of female couriers during the Polish–Ukrainian War. During the fighting, Zagórska lost her teenage son, 14-year-old Jerzy Bitschan, who was killed by Ukrainian shells on the Lychakiv Cemetery, and about whom several songs were later written. Altogether, 66 Polish women died fighting in Lviv in late 1918.

During the Polish–Soviet War of 1919–1921, Ochotnicza Legia Kobiet, which grew to 2,500 members, helped the Polish Army in such places as Warsaw and Vilnius (from May 1919). In Vilnius, in mid-1920, Polish women under Wanda Gertz defended the city, facing the Mounted Corps of Gai Khan.

After the war, in 1923, the organization was dissolved. Five years later, members of the OLK created the organization Przysposobienie Wojskowe Kobiet (Women's Military Training").
