= Przysposobienie Wojskowe Kobiet =

Przysposobienie Wojskowe Kobiet (Female Military Training) was a Polish organization for women, which existed in the interbellum period as well as during World War II. This was not a paramilitary organisation.

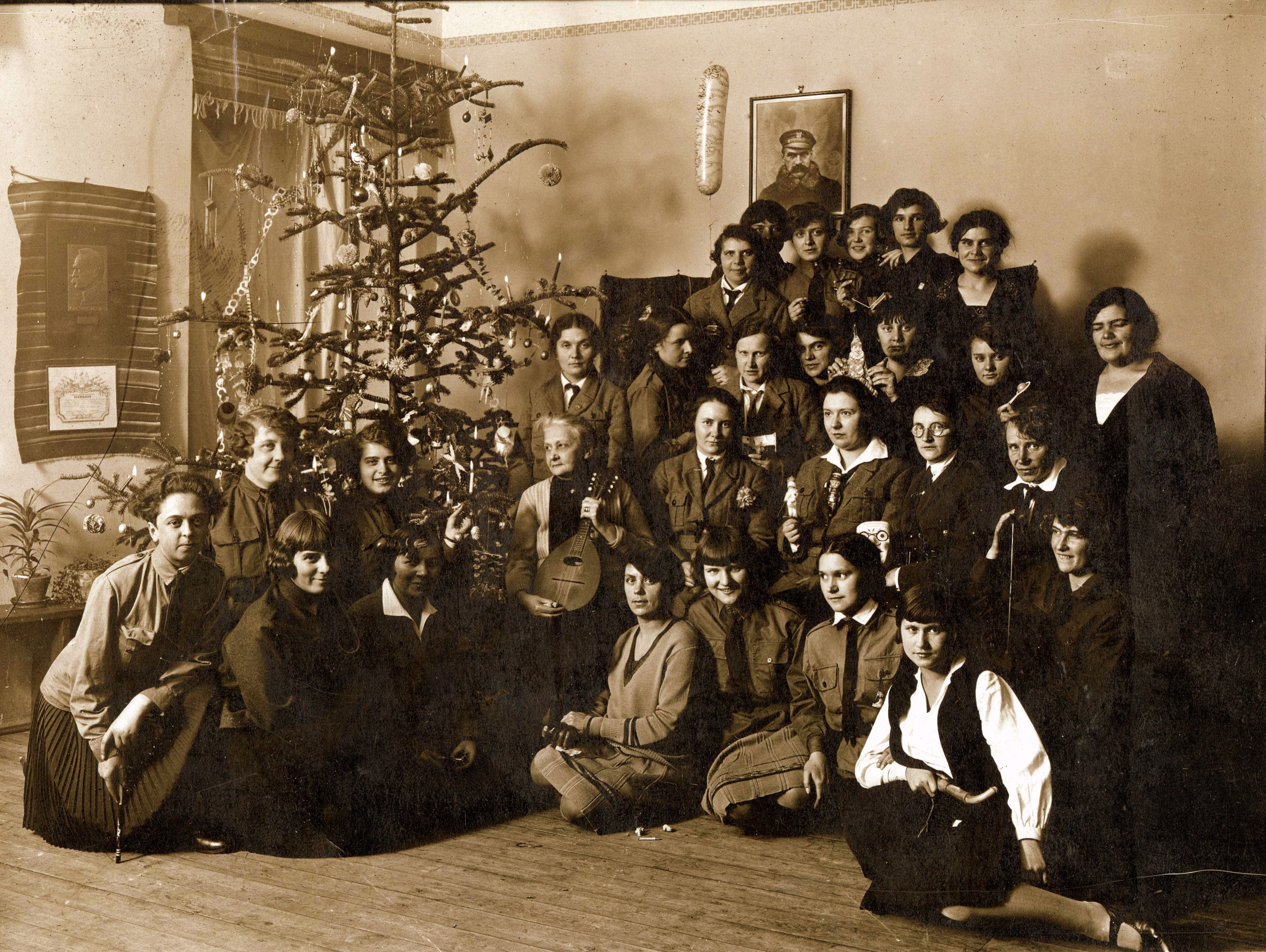
"Christmas evening party " of the Women's Military Training in Warsaw, ca 1935 - in the middle of the picture (with Theorbo) Aniela Masłowska (1864-1940), at top of picture under the balloon and portrait of Józef Piłsudski - Aniela Łagowska (1897-1972) - with a necktie visible

== Background ==
In the autumn of 1918 Poland regained national independence, which had been lost as a result of the Partitions of Poland. Soon afterwards, numerous conflicts with several neighbouring states started, and in many cases Polish women organized to actively participate in them, as auxiliaries to the Polish Army. The most famous example of such a unit was the Ochotnicza Legia Kobiet (Voluntary Legion of Women), created in late 1918 or early 1919 in Lwów, for which Poles fought with the Ukrainians. The first commandant of the Ochotnicza Legia Kobiet, Colonel Aleksandra Zagorska, lost her only son, 14-year-old Jerzy Bitschan, in this conflict. Poems and a song were written about him years later.

The Ochotnicza Legia Kobiet also actively participated in the Polish-Soviet War of 1919-1921, it had some 2 500 members and after the Peace of Riga it was dissolved, in 1923. But several women, with Maria Wittek as their leader, did not want to give up. They wanted equality, also concerning military service, which, in their opinion, should also be available to females.

== Creation ==
Przysposobienie Wojskowe Kobiet was created in 1928 and its members were volunteers, women and girls over 15 who wanted to prepare themselves for future military service. Enjoying the support of the government and the army, the organization had several facilities, in which summer and winter camps took place. Many of the camps that were built and used by Przysposobienie Wojskowe Kobiet, are now popular places for vacationing - Garczyn by Kościerzyna in Pomerania, Istebna by the Olza River in Cieszyn Silesia, Charzykowo near Poznań, Spała by Tomaszów Mazowiecki, but also Koszewniki near Grodno, now located in Belarus.

== World War II and aftermath ==
During the Polish September Campaign, members of the organization distinguished themselves and the most famous personality associated with Przysposobienie Wojskowe Kobiet is undoubtedly Elżbieta Zawacka, whose activities helped the Polish Army Headquarters in London to give women of the organization the same rights and privileges as those enjoyed by male soldiers. Women actively took part in Home Army actions.

There were numerous women soldiers in the Warsaw Uprising. After its collapse, the Germans treated them as regular soldiers, according to the Geneva Convention. Unlike civilians from Warsaw, they were not sent to concentration camps such as Ravensbrück and Stutthof, but to special POW camps, operated by the Wehrmacht, mainly Stalag VI-C in Oberlangen and Oflag IX-C in Molsdorf. In the Stalag VI-C there were almost 2,000 women-soldiers, they were freed by the 1st Armoured Division (Poland) of General Stanisław Maczek. Oflag IX-C was freed by the Americans of the US Third Army led by General George S. Patton.

After the war, all Polish women-soldiers were gathered in Burg, Hessen, where they received English uniforms with a "Poland" sign on their sleeves.

== Notable members ==
Stefania Wojtulanis-Karpińska, pilot in Polish Air Force and British Air Transport Auxiliary in World War Two.

== Commemoration ==
In January 2017 the association "Ogólnopolska Grupa Rekonstrukcji Historycznej Przysposobienia Wojskowego Kobiet" was founded.

== Sources (all in Polish) ==
- https://web.archive.org/web/20110929115316/http://w.icm.edu.pl/ak/wystawa-jk.html
- https://web.archive.org/web/20070728030554/http://pluton.um.torun.pl/~archAK/koniecznie-przeczytaj/jk/jk-12sesja.html
- https://web.archive.org/web/20070927204225/http://www.mon.gov.pl/pl/artykul/2900
