= Aleksandra Zagórska =

Lieutenant colonel in the Polish Armed Forces

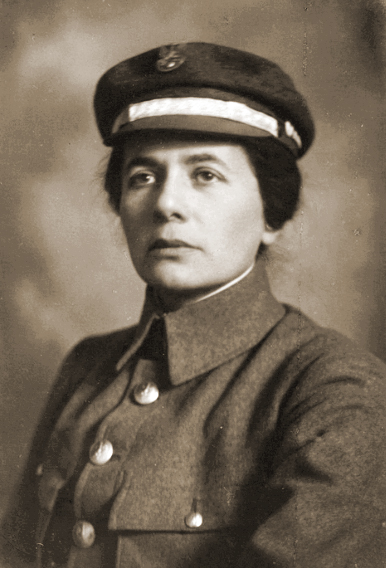
- Major Aleksandra Zagórska in uniform, Lwów ca. 1918–1919
- Born: 24 April 1884 (Poland) Lublin
- Died: 14 April 1965 (aged 80) (Poland) Warsaw
- Burial place: Bródno Cemetery, Targówek, Warsaw, Poland
- Relatives: Jerzy Bitschan (son)
- Military career
- Allegiance: Poland
- Branch: Polish Legions; Ochotnicza Legia Kobiet; Polish Land Forces
- Service years: 1904–1921
- Rank: Lieutenant colonel podpułkownik
- Unit: Ochotnicza Legia Kobiet
- Commands: Ochotnicza Legia Kobiet; Commandant; Brigade I of the Polish Legions; Commandant of women's intelligence service
- Conflicts: World War I Polish–Ukrainian War; Battle of Lwów; Polish–Soviet War
- Awards: Knight's Cross of Order of Polonia Restituta Cross of Independence with Swords Cross of Valour (twice) Gold Cross of Merit Commemorative Medal for War 1918–1921

Lt. Col. Aleksandra Zagórska, firstly, Bitschan, secondly, Zagórska, aka Aleksandra Bednarz (born 24 April 1884 in Lublin, died 14 April 1965 in Warsaw) – was a lieutenant colonel in the Polish Armed Forces, a soldier in the Legions, organizer and commandant of the Voluntary Legion of Women and an independence activist.

== Background ==
She was born the daughter of Antoni Lubicz-Radzimiński and Flora, née Dzięciołowska. She spent her childhood in Sandomierz. From 1894, she attended the preparatory course at Zamość, followed by secondary school in Radom, where she became an associate of the Polish Socialist Party, PPS.

== Independence Activism ==
In 1904, she enrolled at the Jagiellonian University in Kraków. The same year she joined the Combat Organization of the Polish Socialist Party. In 1906, together with Czesław Świrski, a leading activist and close associate of Jozef Pilsudski, she established a clandestine manufacture of explosives for the Combat Organization. In November 1906, she suffered Mercury poisoning due to her involvement in explosives production and had to undergo a period of treatment in Zakopane. After convalescence she went on to Warsaw where she continued her activism. In July 1907, she took part in a failed attempt to blow up a military train at Łapy. In March 1908, she was arrested and taken to Pawiak prison. Owing to a financial inducement, the charges against her were dropped during her trial and she was temporarily released in October of that year. She continued to be at risk of arrest and escaped to Galicia. She settled in Lwow and at the bidding of Tomasz Arciszewski, she became involved in the procurement of weapons and PPS publications for dispersal in the Polish Kingdom. In 1911, she joined the Union of Armed Struggle and the Riflemen's Association. She organized women's squads within the Polish Military Organisation.

== World War I ==
During World War I, she organized and commanded the women's intelligence service within the Brigade I of the Polish Legions. With the rank of major she took part in the Battle of Lwów. During the Polish - Ukrainian War she organised the women's courier network. On 4 November 1918, she formed the women's paramilitary organization, Ochotnicza Legia Kobiet (OLK), of which she was the commander in the city of Lwów. The organization took an active role in the Polish–Soviet War. On 1 April 1920, she was named commander of the Voluntary Women's Legion within the First Mobilisation Unit of the Ministry of War in Warsaw. At the same time, she was promoted to the military rank of major. Her Adjutant was lieutenant Stanisława Paleolog. On account of her role she became commander of all Women's OLK units throughout all territories controlled by the Polish Ministry of War. On 1 October 1921, at her own request, she stood down from military service. She had advanced to the rank of lieutenant colonel.

== Interwar Period ==
During the Interwar period from 1922–1924, she lived in Kobierzyn, Lesser Poland Voivodeship near Kraków, and from 1927 in Lwow, where her husband was the superintendent of several psychiatric hospitals. After the death of her husband, she moved to Radość near Warsaw and became an organiser of children's summer camps for the Warsaw Educational Service. In 1928 she became organizer of the Polish Union of Women Legionnaires and was its president until 1939.

== World War II ==
During the Nazi occupation of Poland she joined the Resistance as part of the left-leaning Coalition of Independence Organisations -Konwent Organizacji Niepodległościowych.

== Personal life ==
From her first marriage, she had a son, Jerzy Bitschan, who at 14 years of age, as a Lwow Eaglet, took an active part in the Defence of Lwow and was killed on 21 November 1918. Her second husband was a Lwów doctor, Roman Zagórski, with whom she lived in the Kulparków district of the city. After World War II, she lived in Zakopane under the pseudonym, "Aleksandra Bednarz", to avoid state persecution due to her history of activism. She died on 14 April 1965 aged 79. She was buried at Bródno Cemetery in Warsaw.

== Military and civilian awards ==
- Knight's Cross of the Order of Polonia Restituta (Krzyż Kawalerski Orderu Odrodzenia Polski)
- Cross of Independence – Krzyż Niepodległości, with Swords
- Cross of Valour (twice)
- Gold Cross of Merit
- Commemorative Medal of the 1918–1921 War
- Cross of the Defence of Lwów
- Commemorative badge "Orlęta"

== See also ==
- History of Poland during World War I
- Women's roles in the World Wars
