= Jerzy Bitschan =

Polish soldier (1904–1918)

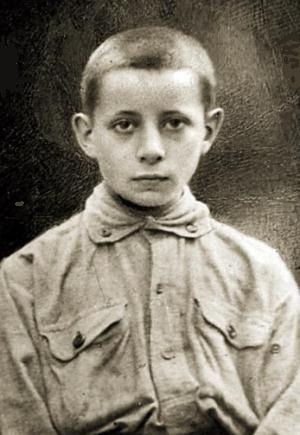
- Image of Jurek Bitschan between 1910–1918
- Born: 29 November 1904; Czeladź, Congress Poland
- Died: 21 November 1918 (aged 13) Lviv, Second Polish Republic
- Buried: Cemetery of the Defenders of Lwów
- Allegiance: Second Polish Republic
- Branch: Polish Armed Forces
- Service years: 1918
- Rank: Private
- Conflicts: Polish–Ukrainian War; Battle of Lviv †
- Awards: Cross of Valour; Cross of Independence

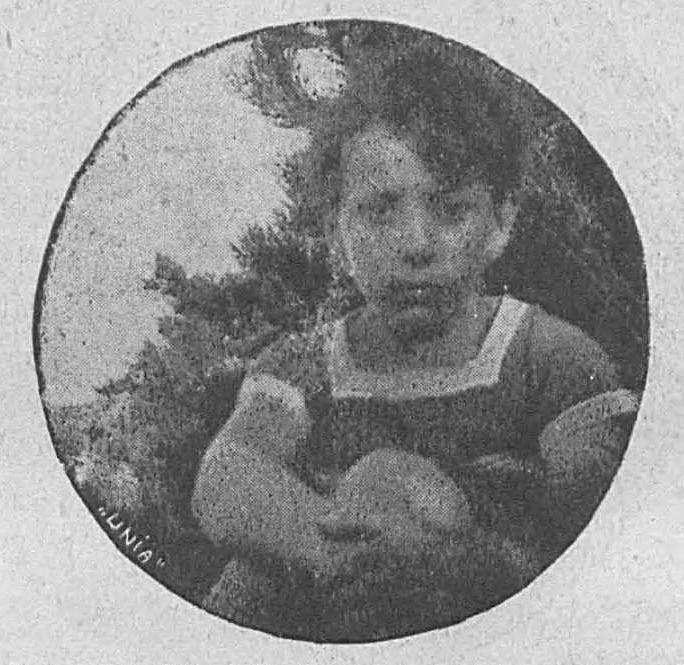
Image of Jerzy Bitschan

Jerzy Bitschan (1904–1918), was a Polish secondary school student, boy scout, and Lwów Eaglet.

== Biography ==
Jerzy Bitschan was born on the 29 November 1904 in Czeladz in Congress Poland He was the only son of Aleksandra Zagórska from her first marriage. He lived with his mother and stepfather, Dr Roman Zagórski, in Kulparkiw in Lviv.

He became a sixth-year pupil at Jordan Middle School. Where he was considered to be an intelligent pupil, he also belonged to the 2nd Lviv Scout Troop.

After the Polish defence of Lviv began in November 1918 during the Polish-Ukrainian War, Jerzy Bitschan wanted to take part in the fighting. On 17 November, shortly after recovering from tonsillitis, his mother, who was serving in another part of the city at the time, visited him at home. The next day, he accompanied his mother to the front line, remaining at the corner of Leona Sapiehy Street.D espite his stepfather, Dr Roman Zagórski, disapproving of Jerzy joining the war effort, on 20 November 1918 he left home and went to the war zone. He left a note saying:

Dear Father! Today I am going to enlist in the army. I want to prove that I have enough strength to serve and endure. It is also my duty to go when I have enough strength, and there is still a shortage of troops to liberate Lviv. I have already learned as much as I needed to.

— Jerzy

A book entitled Śpiewy historyczne (Historical Songs) by Julian Ursyn Niemcewicz was left on his desk with the page:

Listen, young knights
To the mournful moans of the lute
May it inspire in you a desire for fame
Memories of ancient valour
Listen to how a famous crown
Was won by a brave young man
Fighting in defence of his homeland
And who died a noble death.

He then reported to the Polish army in Kulparków. According to an eyewitness account by Second Lieutenant Adam Plutecki, on the night of 20/21 November 1918, the Kulparków company received orders to attack and capture Pohulanka and Snopków. Initially, there were no plans to take Bitschan with them due to his young age, but after his insistent pleas not to leave him behind (he reportedly said: I would burn with shame), he was given permission to go, with Sergeant Aleksander Śliwiński entrusted with his care. After the capture of Snopkov, Bitschan was assigned to guard duty. Encouraged by their success so far, the soldiers decided to attack the Ukrainians gathered in the St. Peter and Paul barracks opposite the Lychakiv Cemetery. On their way to the action, they encouraged Bitschan, who was standing in the guard booth, to go with them. During the shelling of Polish forces at the cemetery, Bitschan was hit twice in the legs by exploding Ukrainian shells, but despite this, he continued to fire (at that time, Corporal Śliwiński was fatally wounded in the head). The wounded Bitschan was carried by Second Lieutenant Plutecki behind the chapel and treated where it was found out he also sustained head injuries.Faced with increasing fire from the barracks, the small Polish attack group was forced to retreat towards Pohulanka, leaving behind the dead and wounded, which included Bitschan. Jerzy Bitschan passed away on the 21 November 1918 at 13 years old. The next day, 22 November, after the liberation of Lviv by the Poles, the boy's bloodied body which was lying in the snow and covered with chrysanthemum. When it was found it was identified by his stepfather.

Jerzy Bitschan was buried in a joint funeral with Aleksander Śliwiński, attended by numerous residents of Lviv and accompanied by a volley of cannons and machine guns. After exhumation, his remains were buried in the crypt of Catacomb III at the Cemetery of the Defenders of Lviv.

== Legacy ==
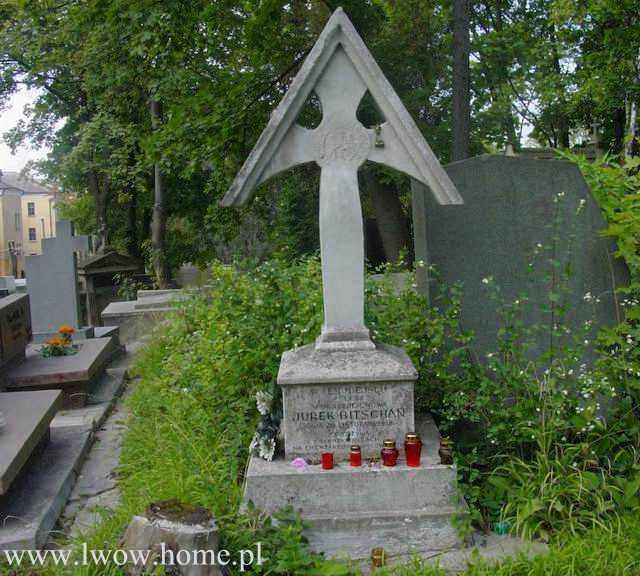
Grave of Jerzy Bitschan

The figure of Jurek Bitschan, who fell in the battles for Lviv, has become part of legend and a symbol of the sacrifice made by young people in defence of the city. After the boy's death, the popular Ballad of Jurek Bitschan was written to lyrics by poet Anna Fischerówna, who dedicated an eight-verse poem entitled Jurek Bitschan to the boy. The music was composed by Father Józef Polit, and the song was published in the New School Songbook in Przemyśl in 1920. verses 1, 7 and 8:

"Dearest Mum, stay well I'm going to battle with my brothers Your words taught me Your example taught me..."	It breaks, but falls again... "Oh, mother! Don't cry, don't!... Pure Queen of Heaven! Continue to guide me!..."	The living fought until dawn, Until the golden rays of the sun, But without Jurek Bitschan, Because Jurek... had already passed away...

In 1991, a street was named after Jurek Bitschan in Kraków's Prądnik Czerwony district. In Lublin, near the Lublin Castle, there is a square named after him.

On 13 May 1922, by decree of the Minister of Military Affairs Kazimierz Sosnkowski, Bitschan was posthumously awarded the Cross of Valour for the defence of Lwów.

On 22 April 1938, by order of Polish President Ignacy Mościcki, Bitschan was posthumously awarded the Cross of Independence for "work towards regaining independence".

== Medals ==
- Cross of Valour
- Cross of Independence

== See also ==
- Aleksandra Zagórska
- Lwów Eaglets
