= South Africans in France =

Total population
- 5,925 (2020)

Regions with significant populations
- Greater Paris, Île-de-France, Yvelines, Occitanie

Languages
- French, South African English, Afrikaans, Zulu, Tswana, Cantonese, see languages of South Africa

Religion
- Roman Catholic, Reformed Churches, Jewish, Methodism, Anglicanism, minority: irreligion

South Africans in France are South African expatriates in France or French people of South African descent.

As of 2020, 5,925 South Africans were recorded as living in France.

== Notable South Africans in France ==
- Breyten Breytenbach, writer and painter (emigrant)
- Bernard Le Roux, South African-born rugby union player
- Madeleine Masson, playwright
- Samantha Schoeffel, tennis player
- Gerhard Vosloo, rugby player

== See also ==
- France–South Africa relations
- South African diaspora
- Immigration to France
- French diaspora in South Africa
- Africans in France
