= Bradl =

Bradl is a surname. Notable people with the surname include:

- Stefan Bradl (born 1989), German Grand Prix motorcycle racer, 2011 Moto2 World Champion
- Helmut Bradl (born 1961), German former Grand Prix motorcycle road racer
- Josef Bradl (1918 – 1982), Austrian ski jumper
- Kazimierz Leski (1912 —2000), nom de guerre Bradl, Polish engineer
