= Anna Leska =

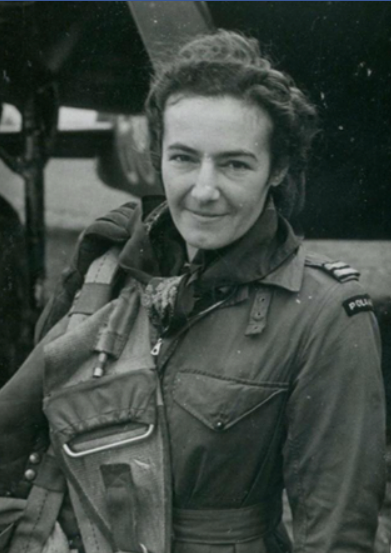
- Born: 14 November 1910
- Died: 21 January 1998 (aged 87)

Anna Leska (14 November 1910 - 21 January 1998) was a Polish pilot certified to fly gliders, balloons and aeroplanes. She was one of the two first Polish woman pilots to join the British Air Transport Auxiliary, the other being Stefania Wojtulanis-Karpińska.

== Early life and education ==
Anna Leska was born on 14 November 1910 to Maria Marta (née Olszyńska) (1886-1949) and Juliusz Stanisław Natanson-Leski (1884-1953). Her father was an engineer and a pioneer of Poland's arms industry. Her younger brother was Colonel Pilot Kazimierz Leski, codename "Bradl", an intelligence officer in the Polish Home Army.

In 1927, she passed her matriculation exam at the Cecylia Plater-Zyberkówna school in Warsaw.

From the age of eighteen, she trained to pilot gliders, hot air balloons and aeroplanes at the Warsaw Aeroclub and the Aeroklub Pomorski (Pomeranian Aero Club), eventually earning her A and B glider pilot licence and qualifying as a balloon pilot. From 1938, she was a member of the Warsaw Aeroclub.

== Second World War ==
In September 1939, she was called up for auxiliary military service, appointed a wartime Podporuchik (second lieutenant) and assigned to the Staff Squadron of the Air Command Eskadry Sztabowej Dowództwa Lotnictwa. On 22 September 1939, Leska managed to escape in an RWD-13 aircraft from a German-controlled airfield in Okęcie, from where she witnessed the bombing of Warsaw. The Polish aircraft had been hidden in the surrounding forests to protect the fleet from attack and had been camouflaged between the trees. Pilots were instructed to move the planes out of the forest between air raids, and take off rapidly without waiting for the engine to warm up. Leska later described her escape flight as "taking off from an undug potato field" in an air raid.

== Air Transport Auxiliary ==
She made her way to the United Kingdom via Romania and France, where she began her efforts to become a member of the British Air Transport Auxiliary (ATA). The ATA required at least 250 solo flying hours from applicants to be pilots but Leska was a newly qualified pilot when she flew in the Polish September campaign with only around 30 hours in her log book. She later said "of course, I lied and admitted to about 250 hours”. On 1 January 1941, after training and passing her exams, she became a Pilot Third Officer in the ranks of the Air Transport Auxiliary. She was the 28th woman accepted into the ATA, and the first Polish woman alongside Stefania Wojtulanis-Karpińska. From early 1941 she piloted aircraft from factories and repair shops to field airfields, and took part in flying equipment transfers. They often piloted bombers, delivering them from factory airfields to the airfields of bomber squadrons throughout the UK. "Most [women pilots] were English, 27 American, as well as Canadians, New Zealanders, South African pilots, a small number of Dutch women and only three of us Poles," recalled Stefania Wojtulanis-Karpińska, one of the first foreign women pilots in the ATA (the third Polish women pilot was Jadwiga Piłsudska, daughter of Józef Piłsudski, the Polish prime minister). Leska served in the ATA from 6 January 1941 until 30 November 1945, being promoted to Pilot First Officer. She was made a Flight Leader in spring of 1943 and oversaw eight women pilots, five British, one Chilean, one Argentinian and one American. During that time Leska was stationed at the ATA pools at both Hatfield and Hamble. She ferried 1,295 aircraft of 93 types, including flying boats and 557 Spitfires in a total of 1,241 flying hours. Along with other women pilots, Leska was photographed for publicity purposes, including a shot of her in the cockpit of a Spitfire at White Waltham taken by photographer Lee Miller which was published by British Vogue in June 1942.

== Personal life ==
Anna Leska married Captain Pilot Mieczysław Daab of 301 Squadron in Britain in 1947.

== Later life ==
In 1977, Leska-Daab and her husband returned permanently to Poland. She was later active in the Warszawski Klub Seniorów Lotnictwa (Warsaw Senior Aircraft Club).

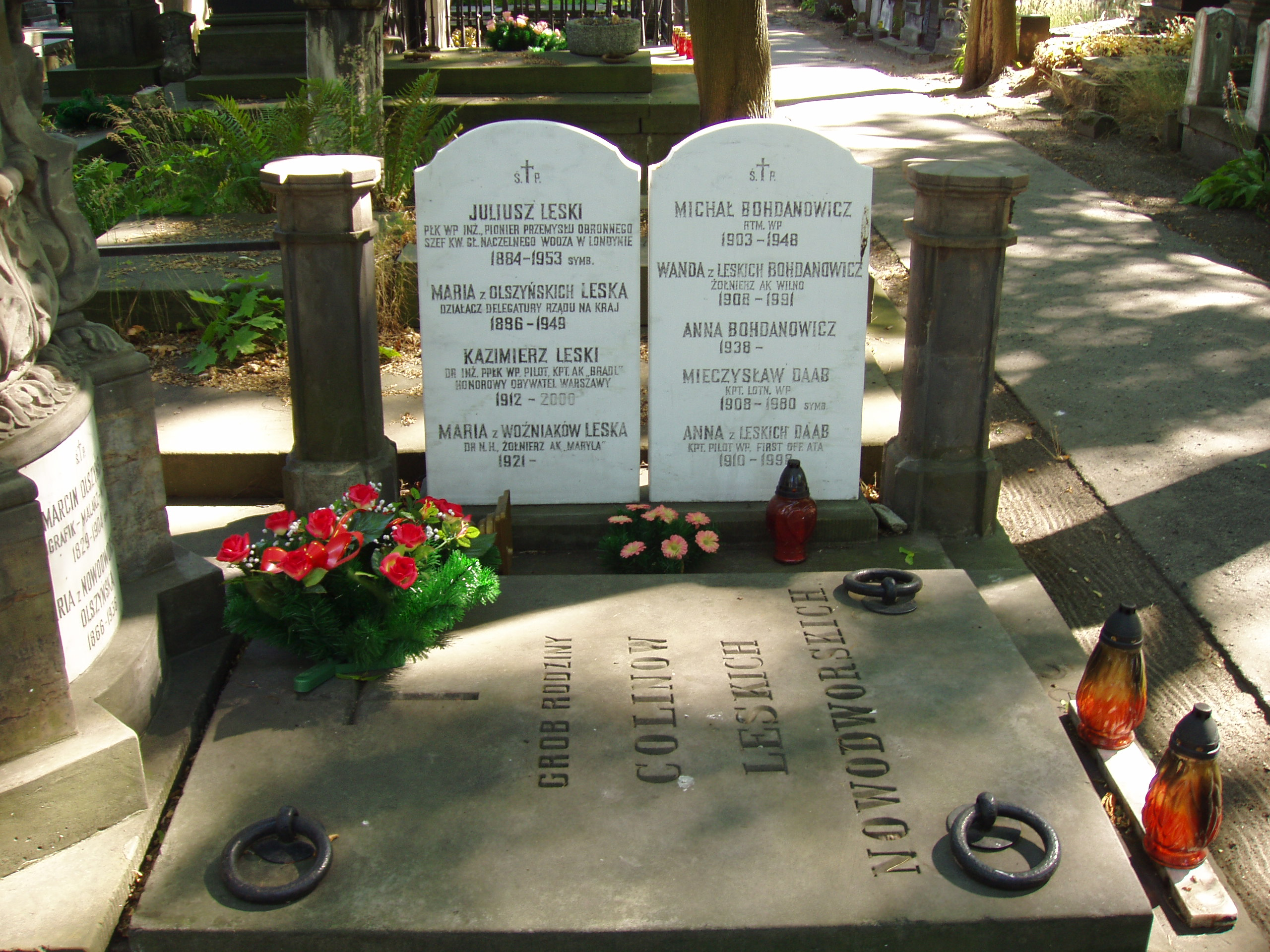
Grave of Anna Leska-Daab and her family

Anna Leska-Daab died on 21 January 1998 and was buried at the Powązki Cemetery in cemetery section 24, row 6, grave 1, alongside her parents and siblings.

== Recognition and commemoration ==
Leska-Daab was awarded the Golden Wings badge of honour, awarded to senior officer aviators with more than 6,000 hours in the air.

In 2005, Anna Leska, Stefania Wojtulanis-Karpińska and Jadwiga Piłsudska featured in Polki Nad Londynem, a documentary about their wartime flying experiences.

Leska's portrait featured in exhibitions of Lee Miller's works at the Imperial War Museum in 2015 and Tate Britain in 2025. A caricature of Leska as Pilot First Officer, with her signature on it is held in the Archiwum Akt Nowych archives in Poland and she was one of the Mothers of Polish Independence featured in the Matki Niepodległości Polski exhibition there in 2022.

== Bibliography ==
- Kazimierz Leski: Życie niewłaściwie urozmaicone: wspomnienia oficera wywiadu i kontrwywiadu AK, Warszawa 2001, Oficyna Wydawnicza Volumen, wyd. 4, ISBN 83-7233-041-7
- Polskie Siły Powietrzne w Wielkiej Brytanii w latach 1940-1947 łącznie z Pomocniczą Lotniczą Służbą Kobiet (PLSK-WAAF). Sandomierz: Stratus. 2012. ISBN 9788361421597. OCLC 276981965.
- "Anna Leska-Daab". Skrzydlata Polska. 3/1998. Warszawa: Agencja Lotnicza. 1998. ISSN 0137-866X. OCLC 839207783.
