= Peter Dreyer =

South African American writer

Peter Richard Dreyer (born November 15, 1939, at Caledon in the Western Cape) is a South African American writer. He is the author of A Beast in View (London: André Deutsch), The Future of Treason (New York: Ballantine), A Gardener Touched with Genius: The Life of Luther Burbank (New York: Coward, McCann & Geoghegan; rev. ed., Berkeley: University of California Press; new, expanded ed., Santa Rosa, CA: Luther Burbank Home & Gardens), Martyrs and Fanatics: South Africa and Human Destiny (New York: Simon & Schuster; London: Secker & Warburg), and most recently the novel Isacq (Charlottesville, VA: Hardware River Press, 2017), https://www.amazon.com/Isacq-Peter-Richard-Dreyer/dp/0999288806#. His recent essays and poetry can be found in "A Desk-Drawer Anthology". Dreyer was born and brought up in South Africa, where he was involved in the anti-apartheid struggle, serving on the Cape Provincial Committee of the Liberal Party, founded and led by Alan Paton, and as secretary of the Western Province Press Association, which published the fortnightly The Citizen (not to be confused with the pro-apartheid tabloid of the same name launched in 1976), which introduced the concept of nonracial democracy in South Africa. At the time, the Liberal Party was the only unsegregated political party in South Africa. The African National Congress (ANC) restricted its membership to black Africans (excluding not only "whites" but "Coloured" and Indian South Africans too), and did not desegregate itself until many years later. Dreyer put forward the idea of nonracialism in a pamphlet titled Against Racial Status and Social Segregation (Claremont, Cape Town, 1958; now very rare, but to be found in the Bodleian Library at Oxford University, the Hoover Library at Stanford University and the South African National Library in Cape Town). The Citizen Group also worked to establish nonracial trade unions, resistance to bus apartheid in Cape Town, and a nonracial theater project, which led to a production of Jean Genet's The Blacks. On February 8, 1958, Patrick Duncan launched the Liberal Party fortnightly Contact, with offices on Parliament Street in Cape Town. Dreyer worked closely with Duncan, and in Contact, 1, no. 15, dated August 23, 1958, he published an article about the newly formed nonracial South African Meat Workers Union under the by-line “Contact Special Correspondent.” On the cover of the magazine, Duncan placed the Citizen group slogan “Forward to a South African patriotism based on non-racial democracy”—the first prominent demand for a nonracial answer to apartheid.

== Angela van Bengale ==
Dreyer’s earliest forebear in South Africa was a slave, Ansla [Angela] van Bengale [of Bengal], also known as Mãe [Mother] or Mooij [Beautiful/Pretty] Ansla, imported there in 1657 and bought by Commander Jan van Riebeeck. Manumitted, she married a German free burgher named Arnoldus Basson. Their great-granddaughter Catharina Maasdorp (1757–86) later married the frontiersman Daniel Ferdinand Immelman (1756–1800), the guide of the Swedish naturalists Carl Peter Thunberg and Anders Sparrman (Linnaeus's star pupils) in the Cape Interior in the late eighteenth century. Peter Dreyer is a direct descendant of Catharina and Daniel Ferdinand.

== Subsequent career ==
Peter Dreyer left South Africa in 1962 and subsequently launched and edited Omphalos: A Mediterranean Review in Athens. In 1972, however, he was expelled from Greece by the military junta then in power there and moved to the United States. In New York he was a contributor to The Nation and to Coburn Britton's belletrist magazine Prose. During the 1970s, he was book columnist for San Francisco magazine and a frequent contributor to the San Francisco Review of Books. He has lived in Virginia since 1988. Dreyer's 2017 novel Isacq (Hardware River Press) is a picaresque account of the (fictional) life and adventures of his forefather Isacq d’Algué, alias Johannes Augustinus Dreyer (1689–1759; grandnephew of the Pietist leader August Hermann Francke), with brief flash-forwards into the future. Thousands of people living in southern Africa today are descended from Isacq d’Algué, who arrived at the Cape in 1713 as an adelbors, or midshipman, on a Dutch East India Company ship. Dreyer is currently at work on a memoir dealing with his early experiences in the anti-apartheid movement and looking at how things have turned out.

== A Beast in View ==
Dreyer's novel A Beast in View (1969), which was banned by the apartheid government of South Africa immediately on publication, was undoubtedly the first work of fiction ever to deal with the controversial subject of fracking. Set in part in an apartheid Greater South Africa, in a hypothetical future, the novel features a scheme to extract oil from shale in the Karoo region by detonating nuclear bombs in the shale bed. This was not just science fiction: the idea was based on an actual proposal by the Continental Oil Company to the United States Atomic Energy Commission, "Project Dragon Trail: The Stimulation of a Natural Gas Reservoir by a Contained Nuclear Explosion," which envisioned setting off a 40-kiloton device in Rio Blanco County, Colorado, with the assistance of the CER Geonuclear Corporation (three 33-kiloton nuclear devices were eventually detonated as a test in 1973 under the rubric Project Rio Blanco). Continental Oil was not alone in the nuclear fracking field: the Standard Oil Company (Indiana) obtained a 1967 patent for the same purpose (U.S. Patent 3,342,257, "In Situ Retorting of Oil Shale Using Nuclear Energy"). In Dreyer's novel, this apocalyptic plan is foiled by guerrillas sent in by an internationally based "League of South African Democrats" (there is no mention in the book of the ANC). Proposals to extract oil and gas by fracking in the Karoo are currently under consideration.

== Isacq: A Review ==
There has been an upsurge in interest over the past ten years in the genealogy of the Dreyer family in South Africa. A work of fiction was published recently in the USA that is bound to be of great interest to the many genealogists interested in the history of this and the many other related South African families. Isacq: A Novel (Hardware River Press, 2017; ISBN 978-0-9992888-0-1) is written by author Peter Richard Dreyer, a tenth-generation descendant of Johannes Augustinus Dreyer. . . .

Isacq tells the story of the life and times of Johannes Augustinus Dreyer, progenitor of the Dreyer family of South Africa, as well as a number of other prominent South African families. Johannes Augustinus Dreyer arrived in South Africa on 8 Nov 1713, on board the Dutch East India Company ship the Nesserak on a voyage from Texel in the Netherlands to Batavia under the nom de plume Isacq d’Algué. He was 25 years old. Born in the small town of Grube, close to Lübeck, in [what is now] the northern German province of Schleswig-Holstein to the local Lutheran pastor and his wife, and studying at the University of Rostock by 1708, it remains one of the enduring questions of the Dreyer family history how and why he came to land up in the Cape under a different name, five years on.

In the novel the author uses these basic facts to weave a rich and colourful story of adventure, human folly, comedy and tragedy around this intriguing figure. And yes, it is a story—an interesting mix of historical fact and Informed conjecture. What makes it of interest to family historians is that this novel is based on the most painstaking research that has probably been done on the history of the Dreyer family. As a direct Dreyer descendant, with a long-time interest in the family history, I found the story mesmerising. A very impressive amount of research and astute interpretation has also gone into recreating the early 18th century historical and philosophical milieu within which Isacq’s story unfolds. It is a great pity that having written this as a novel (understandable in the light of the patchy nature of the historical facts), the book misses references and a bibliography. The many amazing facts that were uncovered during the author’s research (such as the fact that Isacq was the grandnephew of the Pietist leader August Hermann Francke) have all been worked into the fabric of the novel, but there is no way the reader can distinguish between these and pure conjecture. One can only hope that the author will at some stage write up the annotated results of his research.

The novel is not bed-time reading. One could treat it as such and just gulp it down out of fascination for the “story”, but that would be a pity. Much food for thought would be lost. Isacq’s ruminations on his life and times (and Isacq’s “thoughts” are at times too clearly the thoughts of an author with the hindsight of today), are provocative and insightful. In fact, the play between the voices of Isacq and author, in many places merging into one, form a most interesting feature of the novel. . . . In all, a fascinating and very worthwhile read—highly recommended to anyone interested in early South African history, genealogy, social history, and the European history and intellectual milieu of those times.—Jeanne Maartens, Cape Family Research Group and Families INFO SA, February 2018

== Notes ==
Martyrs and Fanatics was reviewed in the New Republic by Nobelist Nadine Gordimer. Dreyer's exchange with Stephen Jay Gould in the New York Times Book Review on the subject of Luther Burbank can be found at nytimes.com. Gould reviewed the first edition of A Gardener Touched with Genius, in the New York Times and trashed it on grounds of Burbank's Lamarckism. When Dreyer responded with a letter to the editor, Gould counterpunched aggressively. Moreover, as Dreyer and others have pointed out, Charles Darwin himself was a Lamarckian.
