= Kazimierz Leski =

Polish engineer and inventor

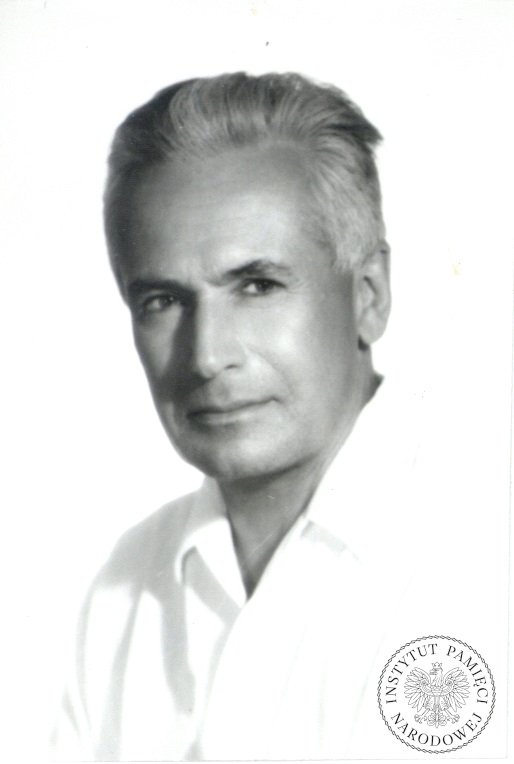
Kazmierz Leski

Kazimierz Leski, nom de guerre Bradl (21 June 1912 — 27 May 2000), was a Polish engineer, co-designer of the Polish submarines ORP Sęp (1938) and ORP Orzeł, a fighter pilot, and an officer in World War II Home Army's intelligence and counter-intelligence.

He is credited, during World War II, with at least 25 journeys across German-held Europe, usually in the uniform of a Wehrmacht major general.

After the war, he was imprisoned by Poland's communist authorities. He spent seven years on death row before being rehabilitated in 1956. He then resumed work as an engineer.

== Early life ==
Kazimierz Leski was born in Warsaw on 21 June 1912 to Maria Marta (née Olszyńska) (1886-1949) and Juliusz Stanisław Natanson-Leski (1884-1953). His older sister was Anna Leska (1910-1998) one of three Polish women to fly in the British Air Transport Auxiliary during the Second World War. His father, Major Juliusz Leski, had been an engineer and a pioneer of Poland's arms industry. following the Polish-Bolshevik War. However, he fell out of grace after the May 1926 Coup d'État, when he remained loyal to the government. Because of that, Kazimierz had to work as a railway worker to pay for his studies at the Wawelberg and Rotwand College in Warsaw. He also got a simple job in the foundry of the Pocisk munitions works. To study professional books, he learned English, Russian and German—abilities that proved invaluable later. Early on, he also learned French.

== Engineer ==
Immediately on graduating in 1936, he was offered a job at the Nederlandse Verenigde Scheepsbouw Bureaus B.V. design bureau (NVSB) in The Hague. The company was the leading design bureau in the Netherlands, working for all the major naval shipyards in the country. Initially working as a draughtsman, Leski learned the Dutch language, enabling him to rise quickly through the ranks of the design bureau.

His career in Dutch shipbuilding was sped up by the Netherlands having won a contract to build two modern Orzeł class submarines for the Polish Navy. He undertook additional studies at the Maritime Faculty of the Delft University of Technology and became one of the heads of the Submarine Division at NVSB, responsible for comparing the designs with the supplied machinery. After he patented a new mounting for the ballast-tank funnels, he was promoted and became an independent specialist. Soon after, Leski became head designer for the Orzeł class submarines – ORP Orzeł and ORP Sęp – and deputy to lead constructor Niemeier.

After work on the submarines was complete, Leski returned to Poland, where he joined the Polish Army and graduated from his third school: the NCO Aviation School in Dęblin.

== War begins ==
Mobilized prior to the 1939 German invasion of Poland, he joined the Polish Air Force. On 17 September 1939 his Lublin R-XIII F plane was shot down by the Soviets, and Leski was badly injured. Soon after, he was taken prisoner of war by Soviet soldiers but managed to escape and reach Lwów. From there he crossed the new Soviet-German "border of peace" and in October 1939 moved to Warsaw, where he joined an underground organization, Muszkieterowie (the "Musketeers"). (Note: Clare Mulley writes: "Recruiting many former officers from the anti-tank rifle (model 35) – or 'musket' – unit, with which he [Stefan Witkowski] had briefly served, he established an intelligence organization known, not very cryptically, as the Musketeers.")

The organization, which was later integrated into the Home Army (Armia Krajowa), was an en cadre military organization primarily focused on intelligence. Thus Leski– still suffering from wounds received in September 1939 and unfit for front-line service in the Forest Units– became a leading intelligence officer with the Musketeers and later with the Home Army.

His most important achievements included a complete list of German military units, their insignia, numbers and dispositions. He and his cell also prepared detailed reports on the logistics and transport of German units bound for the Eastern Front, and on the state of bridges, railways and roads in German-held Europe. Leski's unit also began developing a communications network spanning German-occupied Europe from Poland to Portugal, France and finally the Polish Government in Exile in the United Kingdom.

== Espionage ==
In 1941 Leski made his first trip as a courier to France. In his first trip, he posed as a lieutenant of the Wehrmacht. However, he decided to promote himself to the rank of Generalmajor for all other trips in order to be able to travel first-class, as his wounds made it impossible for him to travel in crowded, third-class railway cars. As General Julius von Halmann, he managed to cross Europe several times without his true identity being discovered. The disguise, his fluent knowledge of several languages and his excellently forged documents also allowed him to witness several events he did not plan. Among them was his 1942 visit to the Atlantic Wall construction site, which was made possible because he convinced one of the passengers in his car that his superiors might want to build a similar line of fortifications in Ukraine. On another occasion he visited the field staff of Field Marshal Gerd von Rundstedt. Apart from his service in intelligence and counter-intelligence, he also took over a cell focused on smuggling information and people in and out of German prisons in occupied Poland, notably the infamous Pawiak.

== Warsaw Uprising ==
At the outbreak of the Warsaw Uprising in August 1944, Kazimierz Leski was not commissioned. However, with a group of volunteers he formed an infantry battalion, Miłosz, and became commander of its first company, Bradl. The unit fought with distinction in the area of Triple Cross Square in the Warsaw City Center. For his gallantry, Leski was promoted to captain and awarded several decorations, including the Silver Virtuti Militari, the Gold and Silver Crosses of Merit with Swords, and three Crosses of Valor.

After the Uprising's capitulation, Leski managed to escape from a column of prisoners and, pretending to be a civilian, returned to the underground. He became commander of the Home Army Western Area and later the chief of the Armed Forces Delegation for Poland.

== Communist prison ==
After the communist takeover of Poland he gradually dismantled his underground net and moved to Gdańsk. A member of the Wolność i Niezawisłość anti-communist resistance, under the false name Leon Juchniewicz he became the first managing director of the demolished Gdańsk Shipyard. His tasks included reconstructing the shipyard, which had been devastated by Allied air raids and by the withdrawing Germans. In August 1945 he received the communist regime's highest civilian award, but later the same day was arrested by the secret police, who had discovered his true identity.

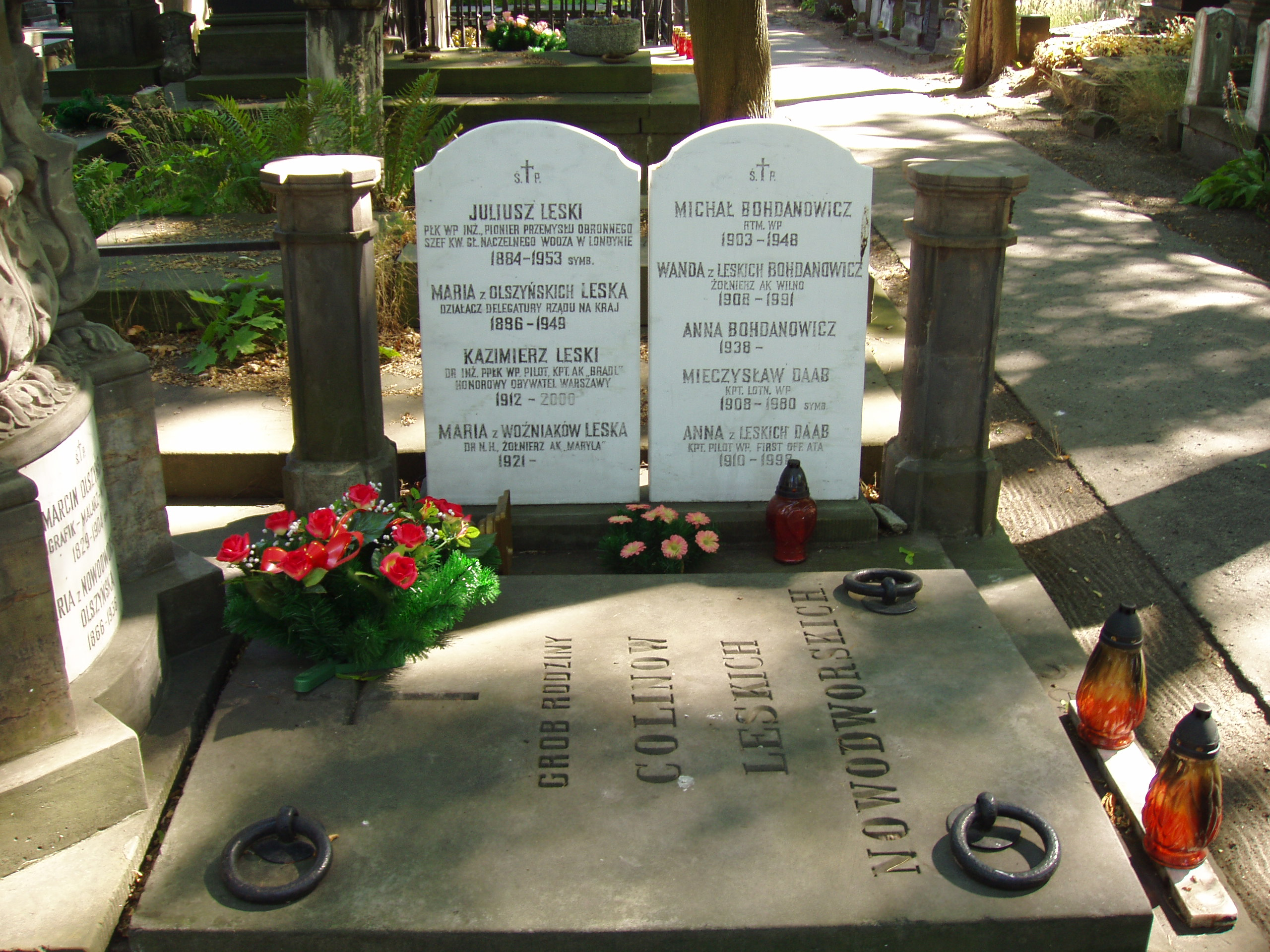
Leski family tomb, Powązki Cemetery, Warsaw

Charged with attempting to overthrow the regime, he was sentenced to 12 years in prison. The sentence was later commuted to six years. However, in 1951 he was not released. Instead, he was charged with having collaborated with the German occupation forces and held in solitary confinement and brutally tortured.

== Rehabilitation ==
After the deaths of Soviet leader Joseph Stalin (1953) and Polish leader Bolesław Bierut (1956), Leski was freed and soon rehabilitated. Still, he could not find a job, as Poland's communist authorities continued to view former Home Army soldiers with suspicion. He had to give up work in the shipbuilding industry and worked as a clerk at the PWT publishing house. Eventually he became a member of the Polish Academy of Sciences. Awarded a doctorate, for political reasons he could not receive the rank of professor for his work on computer analysis of natural language codes. Nevertheless, he continued his scientific work, publishing seven books and over 150 other publications. He also patented inventions. In 1995 he was honored by Yad Vashem as a Righteous Among the Nations.

Largely unknown to the public, in 1989 — after Solidarity's victory and the fall of the communist regime — he published his memoirs, which became a best-seller. He received a Polish PEN Club Prize and the Award of the Polish Writers' Society in Exile.

He died on 27 May 2000 and was interred with military honors at Warsaw's Powązki Cemetery.

== See also ==
- Jan Karski
- Jan Nowak-Jeziorański
- Krystyna Skarbek (was in contact with the "Musketeers" organization)
- List of Poles

== Bibliography ==
- Kazimierz Leski. (1989). Życie niewłaściwie urozmaicone: wspomnienia oficera wywiadu i kontrwywiadu AK (A Checkered Life: Memoirs of a Home Army Intelligence and Counterintelligence Officer) (in Polish). Warsaw: Wydawnictwo Naukowe PWN. ISBN 83-01-08351-4. 600 pp.
- Cpt. Stanisław Wielebski (2003). "Kazimierz Leski". ORP Orzeł (in Polish). Archived from the original on 2012-02-05.
- "Kazimierz Leski". Gazeta Wyborcza (in Polish) (4/07/2001): 11. July 2001.
