= St Mary's Catholic Cemetery, Kensal Green =

Cemetery in Kensal Green, London, England

St Mary's Catholic Cemetery
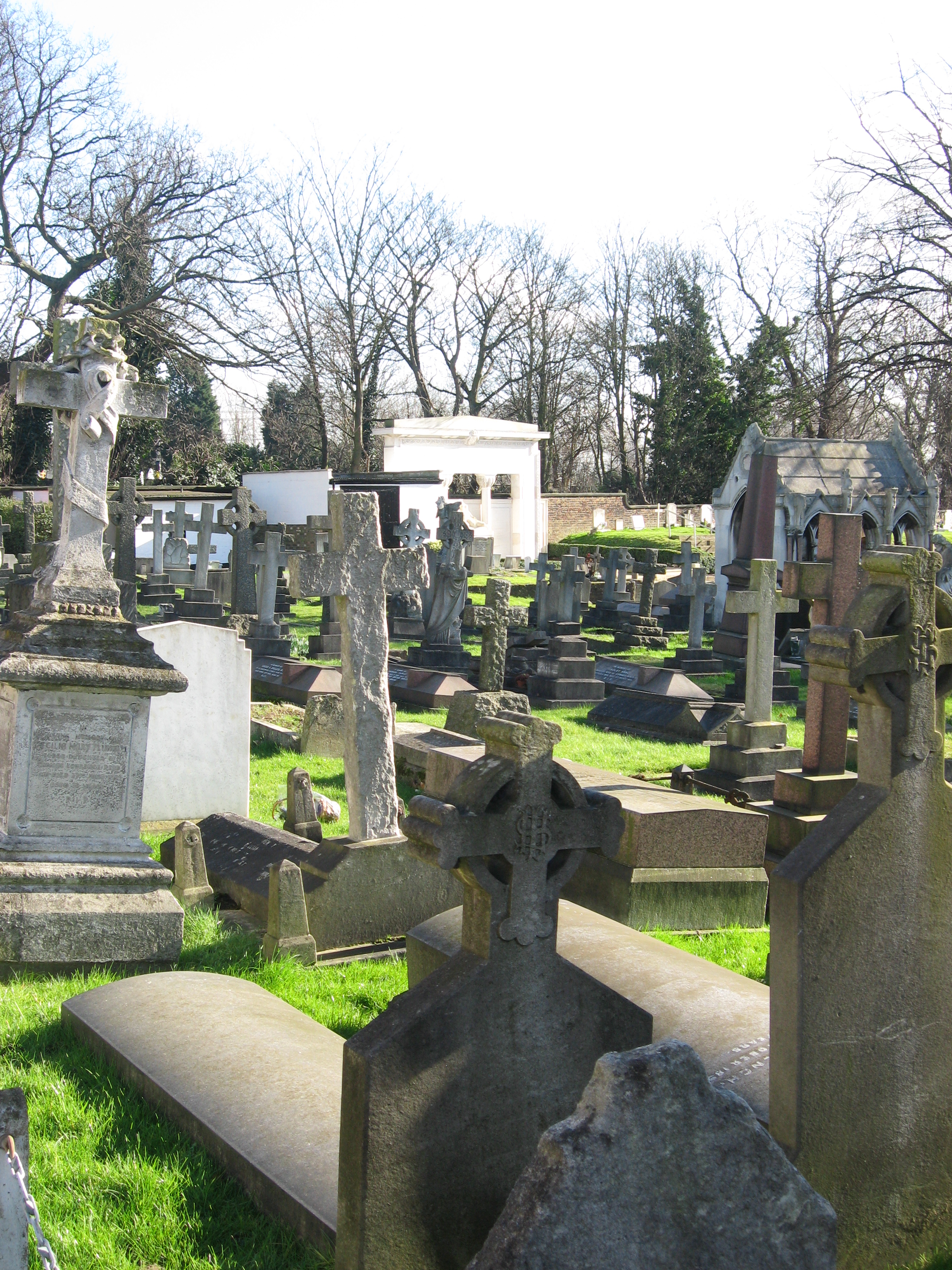
- St Mary's Cemetery
- Interactive map of St Mary's Catholic Cemetery

Details
- Established: 1858
- Location: Harrow Road, Kensal Green, North Kensington , NW10 5NU
- Country: England
- Coordinates: 51.5280°N 0.2336°W
- Type: Roman Catholic
- Size: 29 acres (12 ha)
- No. of graves: 165,187
- Website: Official website
- Find a Grave: St Mary's Catholic Cemetery

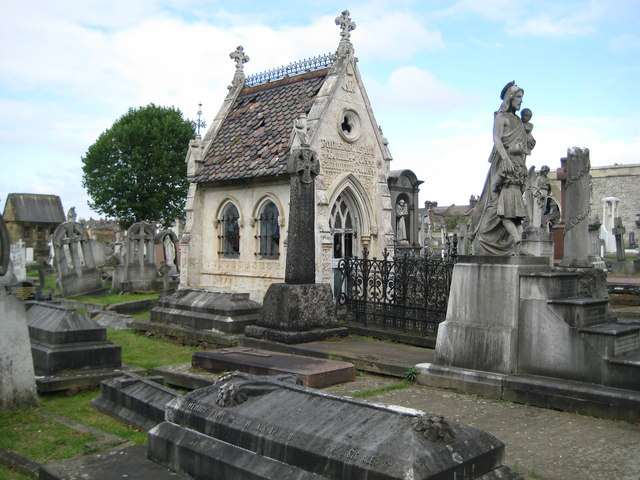
The Misa Mausoleum, built in 1870 for Manuel Misa y Bertemati, the Conde De Bayona and Marques De Misa

St Mary's Catholic Cemetery is located on Harrow Road, Kensal Green in London, England. It has its own Catholic chapel.

The cemetery, founded in 1858, is the resting place of over 165,000 Roman Catholics. The 29-acre cemetery has memorials for Belgian soldiers and Commonwealth service personnel from both World Wars, along with numerous foreign nationality war graves. Notable burials include British spy Peter Ashmun Ames, conductor Sir John Barbirolli, and activist Marcus Garvey. The cemetery, which is open year-round, features a chapel used for funeral and memorial services. Visitors can consult computerized burial records dating back to 1858 at the cemetery office.

== History ==
Established in 1858, the 29-acre (120,000 m^{2}) site was built next door to Kensal Green Cemetery. It is the final resting place for more than 165,000 individuals of the Roman Catholic faith, and features a memorial to Belgian soldiers of the First World War, wounded in combat and evacuated to England, where they died in hospital.

There is also a War Memorial, in the form of a Cross of Sacrifice to the British, Irish, French, Czechoslovak and Canadian servicemen. It is surrounded by a Screen Wall memorial and a low kerb listing Commonwealth service personnel of both World Wars whose graves in the cemetery could not be marked by headstones. In all, the cemetery contains 208 graves of Commonwealth service personnel of the First World War, and 107 graves of the Second World War. There are also many foreign nationality war graves that include, from First World War, 77 Belgians and six Germans, and from the Second, eight Czechoslovak and six Polish war graves.

Many Irish migrants who came to England during the Great Famine are buried here.

== Notable interments ==
- Peter Ashmun Ames (1888–1920), British spy
- Sir John Barbirolli (1899–1970), orchestral conductor
- Marmaduke Barton (1865–1938), pianist and professor at the Royal College of Music
- John Chippendall Montesquieu Bellew (1823–1874), Preacher, reciter, and author
- Prince Louis Lucien Bonaparte (1813–1891), statesman, philologist
- Frank Brangwyn (1867–1956), artist
- Louis Brennan (1852–1932), mechanical engineer and inventor
- Lizzie Burns (1827–1878), wife of Friedrich Engels
- William Pitt Byrne (1806–1861), newspaper editor and proprietor of The Morning Post
- General Sir John Cowans (1862–1921), Quartermaster-General to the Forces in World War I – buried at Terrace 130
- Anne Crawford (1920–1956), actress of stage, radio and film
- Major Thomas Crean (1873–1923), VC recipient in Boer War
- Fr Martin Cyril D'Arcy SJ (1888-1976) English philosopher, Roman Catholic cleric, college administrator and religious art collector
- Frances C. Fairman (1839–1923), English animal painter and illustrator
- James Grant (1822–1887), Scottish author, historian, artist and architect
- Marcus Garvey (1887–1940), Jamaican political activist – initially buried in catacombs beneath the chapel, later reburied in King George VI Memorial Park, Kingston, Jamaica.
- Gilbert Harding (1907–1960), journalist, radio and TV personality
- Percy Hardy (1880–1916), first-class cricketer; committed suicide while serving during World War I.
- Josef Jakobs (1898–1941), German spy – unmarked grave
- William Keatinge (1869–1934), military chaplain and bishop
- Andrzej Kowerski (aka Andrew Kennedy) (1912–1988), decorated Polish soldier and spy
- Danny La Rue (1927–2009), cabaret artist, nightclub owner, actor
- Edmonia Lewis (1844–1907), sculptor
- Father Vincent McNabb, O.P. (1868–1943), Irish scholar and priest
- Henry Edward Manning (1808–1892), Cardinal Archbishop of Westminster (later transferred to Westminster Cathedral)
- Alice Meynell (1847–1922), poet and essayist
- Victoria Monks (1884–1927), music hall singer
- The Lord Morris (1859–1935), Prime Minister of Newfoundland
- Patrick O'Connell (1887-1959), Irish football player and manager
- Major General Sir Luke O'Connor (1831–1915), VC recipient in Crimean War
- T. P. O'Connor (1848–1929), Irish journalist and politician
- Carlo Pellegrini (1839–1889), caricaturist
- Sir Max Pemberton (1863–1950), author, journalist and editor
- Lieutenant Colonel James Henry Reynolds (1844–1932), VC recipient and medical officer at Rorke's Drift
- Sax Rohmer (1883–1959), author, creator of "Dr. Fu Manchu"
- Mary Seacole (1805–1881) nurse, humanitarian
- Krystyna Skarbek (aka Christine Granville) (1908–1952), Polish SOE agent and World War II heroine
- Clarkson Frederick Stanfield (1793–1867), marine painter
- Władysław Studnicki (1867–1953), Polish politician and publicist
- Francis Thompson (1859–1907), poet, literary critic
- Louis Wain (1860–1939), artist
- Nicholas Wiseman (1802–1865), Cardinal Archbishop of Westminster (later transferred to Westminster Cathedral)

== The chapel ==
- The cemetery's Catholic chapel is used for funeral and memorial services. The walls have many memorial plaques.
- The chapel was used in the filming of Miranda episode "Before I Die".

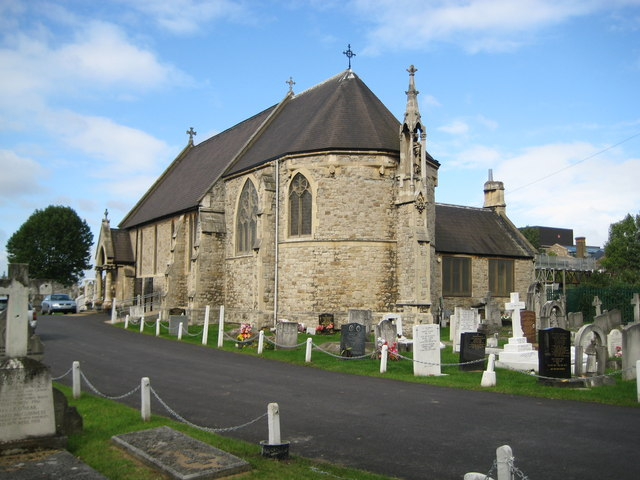
The Chapel

== Access ==
The cemetery is open for visitors every day of the year.

=== Summer opening hours ===
Monday to Saturday – 8 am to 5 pm
Sunday – 9 am to 5 pm

=== Winter opening hours ===
Monday to Saturday – 8 am to 4 pm
Sunday – 9 am to 4 pm

Christmas Day and Boxing Day – 9 am to 1 pm

=== Cemetery office ===
The office is closed on Bank Holidays and during summer months closing times can vary. The summer opening hours are in effect from early April to late October during UK British Summer Time. The winter opening hours are for the rest of the year when the UK has Greenwich Mean Time.

=== Office hours ===
Office hours are Monday to Friday – 9 am to 3 pm. >Visitors may request the office staff consult the computerised records of all interments in St Mary's Catholic Cemetery (from 1858 to date).
