= Ronald Nowicki =

American author and magazine editor

Ronald Nowicki is an American author and magazine editor.

== Life ==
In April 1975 Nowicki founded the San Francisco Review of Books, which was published in the San Francisco Bay Area until 1997. The SFRB began as a magazine and later adopted a tabloid format. In addition to his editor's column, Nowicki also wrote occasional reviews.

The San Francisco Review received little funding and had no backers, so it relied for financial support on a combination of advertising revenues, subscriptions, grants from the National Endowment for the Arts, and volunteers. Despite the limited funding, the Review was published regularly under Nowicki's editorship until the late 1980s. When it was sold in 1989, Nowicki was retained as editor for a year until a successor was installed.

The publication continued well into the late 1990s with various owners, while Nowicki left to interview the last survivors of the Warsaw cabaret for his first book, Warsaw: The Cabaret Years (Mercury House, 1992), about cabaret and coffeehouse life in Warsaw, Poland, between the World Wars.

Nowicki's articles have appeared in The New York Times, Newsweek, The North American Review and other publications. He has been active in the Polish communities of San Francisco and London, where he currently lives.

== Works ==
- Warsaw: The Cabaret Years, Mercury House, 1992. ISBN 1-56279-030-7
- The Elusive Madame G (2013), a biography of Krystyna Skarbek, a.k.a. Christine Granville

== See also ==
- San Francisco Review of Books
