= Victoria Monks =

British music hall singer

Victoria Monks – photograph from the sheet music for "Take Me Back to London Town" published in 1906.

Victoria Annie Monks (1 November 1882 – 26 January 1927) was a British music hall singer of the early 20th century. During the Edwardian and First World War eras she performed and recorded popular songs such as "Take Me Back to London Town" and "Bill Bailey, Won't You Please Come Home?"

== Life and career ==
Monks was born in Blackpool, Lancashire on 1 November 1882, the daughter of Andrew Thomas Monks, an optician. She was educated in both England and Belgium. In August 1897 she is recorded in the Blackpool Gazette & Herald (Friday 13 August 1897) as performing as "Little Victoria" at the Empire, Blackpool; her first appearance in London was at the Oxford Music Hall on 9 March 1903. She went on to appear in all the leading Music Halls, both in London and the provinces as well as performing in South Africa and the United States. She married the American songwriter and Music Hall agent Karl F. Hooper (real name Karl Frederick Gruhler) in 1904 in Dundee and by 1911, they were living in Lambeth, London with a son. By 1914, she was divorced from Gruhler, the final divorce decree being issued on 12 January 1914. In 1915 she was prevented from working following an accident which involved a stage door at one of the Moss Empires theatres; she became bankrupt shortly afterwards.

She died in London in 1927 and is buried in St. Mary's Roman Catholic Cemetery near Harlesden, London. She is commemorated on the Monks family grave in Layton Cemetery, Blackpool. Her name is incorrectly cited there as Gruller, a misspelling of her married name Gruhler.

On 19 April 2024 a blue plaque commemorating Victoria Monks was unveiled by Jodie Prenger at Monks' former home in Blackpool.

== Songs and recordings ==
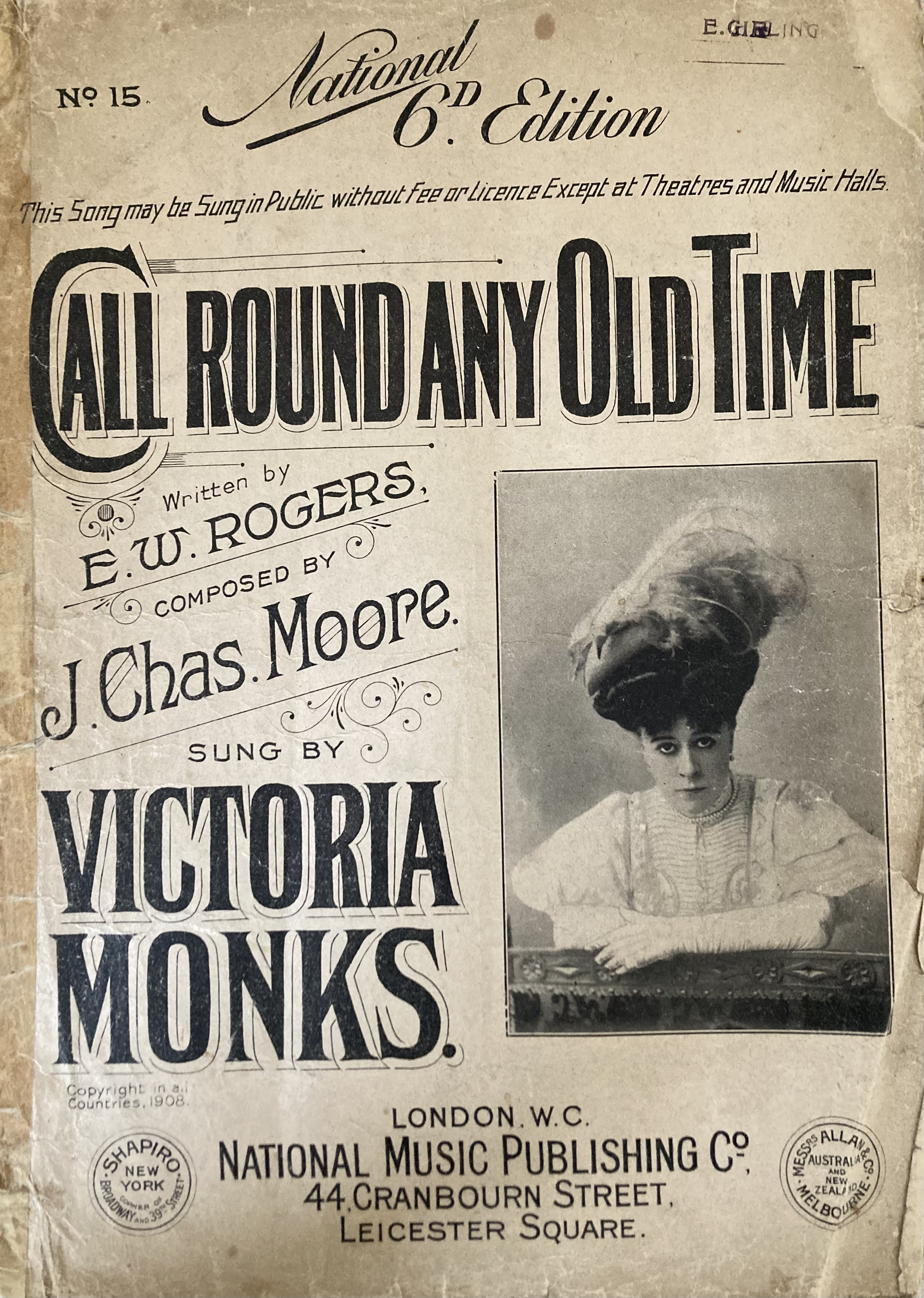
Sheet music for "Call Round Any Old Time"

"Call Round Any Old Time" by Victoria Monks in 1908

Monks performed and recorded a number of popular songs of her day. A list of some of her recordings is given below with lyricists and recording dates where known. Monks recorded for His Master's Voice and their Zonophone sister label between 1906 and 1913. and also for Pathe, Jumbo Fonotipia, Edison and Homophone.

- "Ain't the Old Place Good Enough for You", (Clarence Wainwright Murphy & D. Lipton)
- "Ain't Yer Gwine to Say 'How Do'?". Recorded 1906
- "Buy Me a Home in London"
- "Give My Regards to Leicester Square", (William Hargreaves). Recorded 1906
- "Take Me Back to London Town", (Arthur Trevelyan & Harry Von Tilzer).
- "Ain't I No Use, Mr Jackson?", (Clarence Wainwright Murphy & D. Lipton). Recorded 1906
- "If You Want to Have a Row, Wait Till the Sun Shines", (William Hargreaves). Recorded 1906
- "Won't You Come Home Bill Bailey?", (Hughie Cannon) never recorded
- "Brown Eyes and Blue Eyes" not recorded
- "Ise Gwine Back to Jacksonville". Recorded 1906
- "Love Song". Recorded 1906
- "Open the Door". Recorded 1907
- "Hello Old Man". Recorded 1907
- "Sweet Saturday Night", (Percy Ford & J.B.Mullen). Recorded 1907
- "I'm Leaving Home". Recorded 1907
- "Moving Day", (Andrew B. Sterling & Harry Von Tilzer). Recorded 1908
- "Hello Miss London: A Bunch of Roses", (Tom Mellor). Recorded 1913
- "The Vickey Glide", (Tom Mellor). Recorded 1913
