= Stefania Wojtulanis-Karpińska =

Polish aviator (1912–2005)

Barbara Wojtulanis
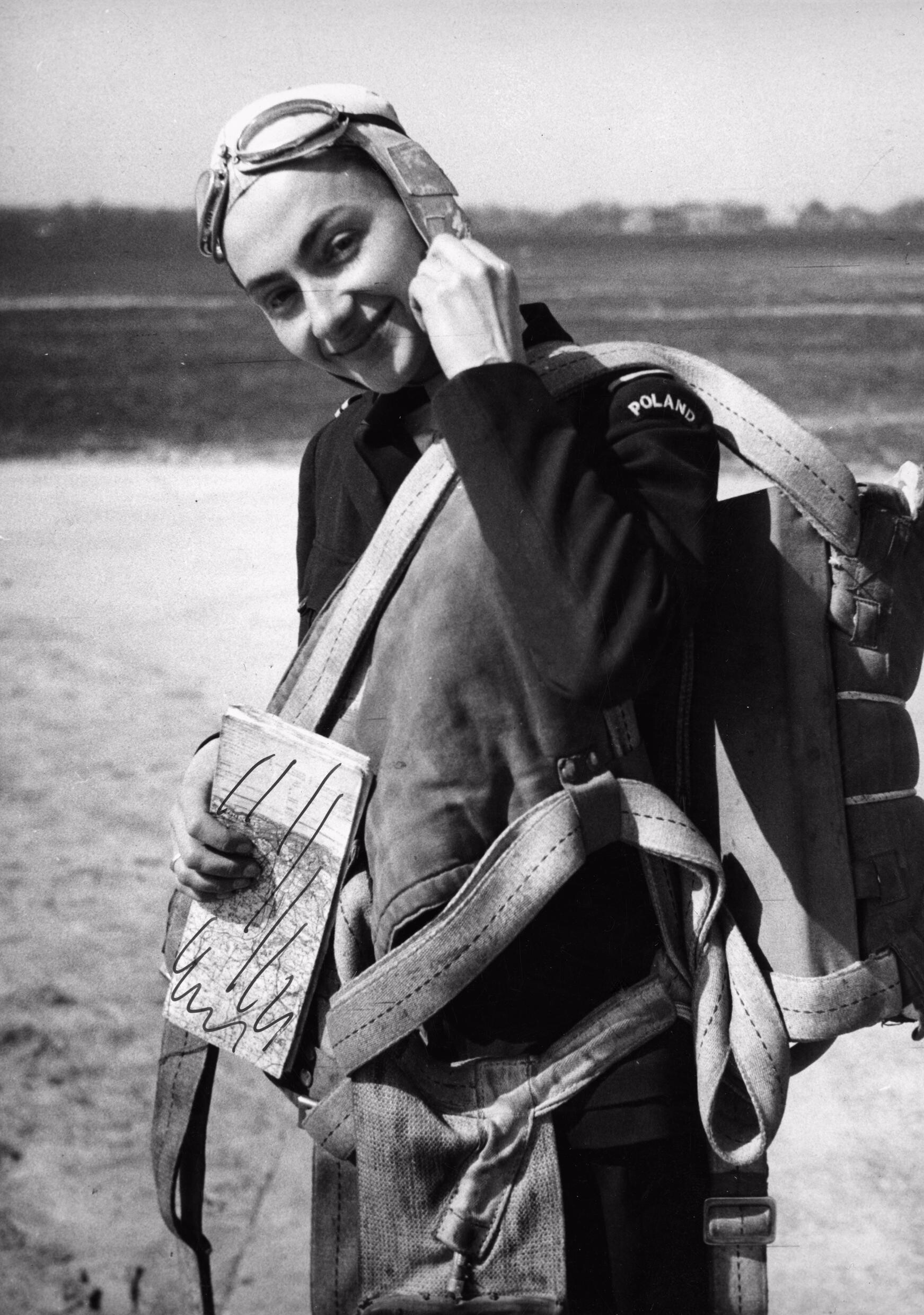
- Born: Stefania Cecylia Wojtulanis; 22 November 1912; Warsaw
- Died: 12 February 2005 (aged 92) Los Angeles
- Conflicts: World War II; September Campaign

Stefania Cecylia Wojtulanis-Karpińska, (22 November 1912 – 12 February 2005) was a Polish aviator. She was a sports pilot in the inter war period and was a Captain in the Polish Air Force. She flew in the British Air Transport Auxiliary (ATA) in the Second World War, when she was known as Barbara Wojtulanis. She was one of the first two Polish woman pilots to join the British Air Transport Auxiliary, the other being Anna Leska.

== Early life and education ==
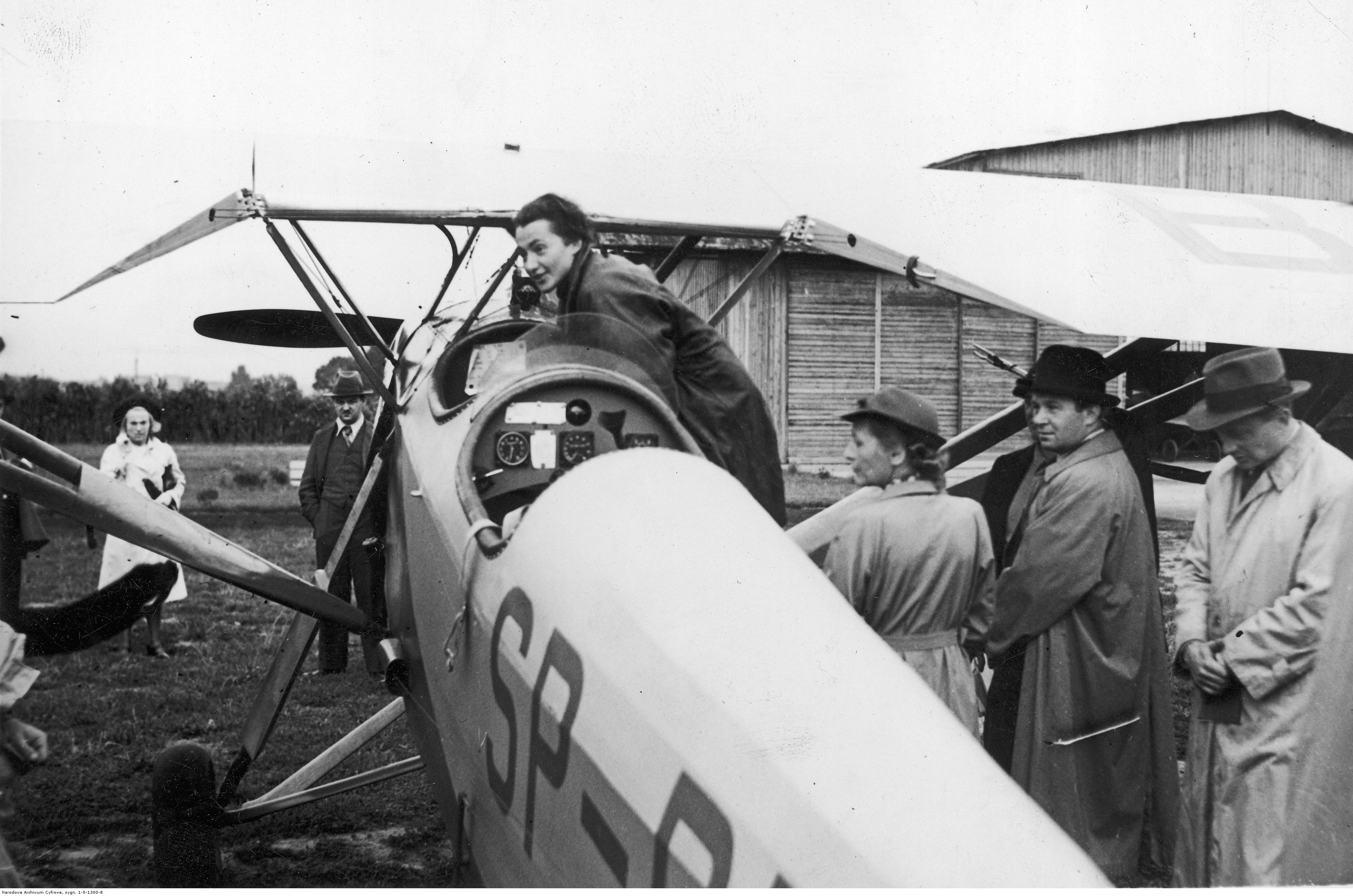
Stefania Wojtulanis disembarking from her RWD-8 plane on arrival at the 1938 national air competition at Mokotow Airport

Stefania Cecylia Wojtulanis was born on 22 November 1912 in Warsaw, Poland, to Maria (née Gawarkiewicz) and Marcin Wojtulanis. From a young age she was interested in aviation. She was active in the Przysposobienie Wojskowe Kobiet (Women's Defence Organisation) and the youth arm of the Aeroklub Warszawski (Warsaw Aero Club), where she was nicknamed Barbara by her fellow pilots and met Jadwiga Piłsudska.

Wojtulanis studied at the Faculty of Mechanical Engineering of the Warsaw University of Technology. She chose the university as its students were given a priority for flying licences through the Warsaw Aero Club. She was one of the first women in Poland to earn balloon and aeroplane pilot's licences. In 1935, she started glider training (in Miłośno, Polichno and Pińczów), after which she also completed a pilot course. She then completed a course for parachuting instructors.

She was involved in all types of air sports, beginning with her participation in the 8th Krajowe Zawody Balonów Wolnych o Puchar im. płk. Aleksandra Wańkowicza (National Free Balloon Competition for the Colonel Aleksander Wańkowicz Cup) on 17 May 1936 in Toruń, as assistant pilot to Franciszek Janik on the "Syrena" balloon (which took ninth place). In 1937, as a pilot in her own right, she took part in the "Skrzydlata Polska" Cup flying competition. She also took part in a group parachute jump in Lwów. In 1938, she took part as a navigator in the 8th National Aviation Competition. On 16 June 1938, as part of the National Aviation Exhibition, the First Lviv Balloon Competition was held in Lviv. The women's team of Wojtulanis and Zofia Szczecińska took fourth place, covering a distance of 189 kilometres (117 mi) and landing in Wygoda near Zalishchyky.

On 28 May 1939, as a balloon pilot, she took part in the 11th Colonel Aleksander Wańkowicz National Free Balloon Competition in Mościce. In June that year, she completed an aerobatics course on RWD-10 and RWD-17 aircraft, and demonstrated her skills in July at the X Zlot do Morza (10th Rally to the Sea).

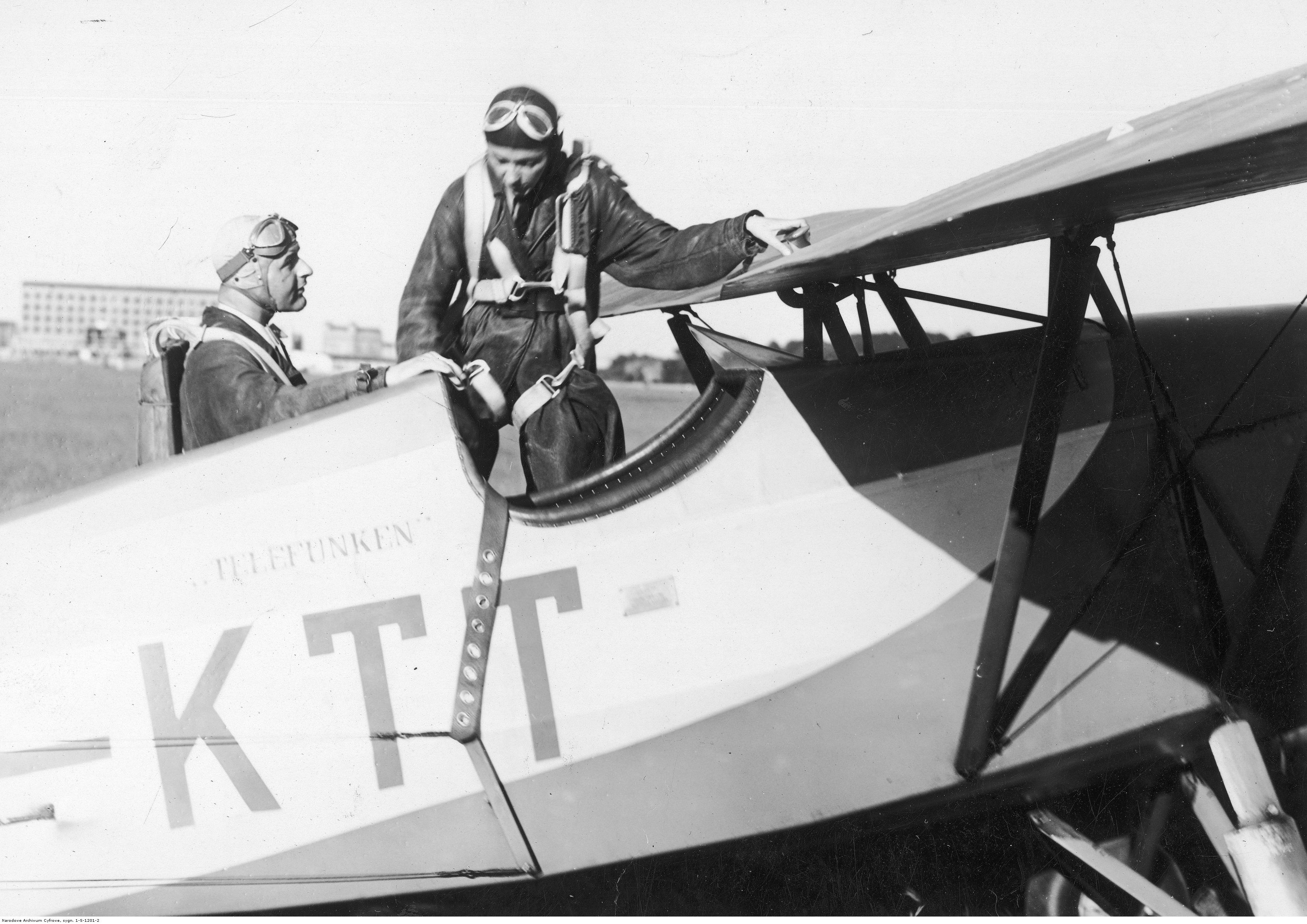
A demonstration at the end of the Warsaw Aerobatic Club aerobatic course. Pilot Stefania Wojtulanis disembarks from her RWD-10 (SP-KTT) aircraft after the show.

Before the outbreak of the Second World War, Wojtulanis spent a total of 192 hours 28 minutes in the air, piloting RWD training and sport aircraft, hot air balloons, and gliders including the motor glider "Bąk".

== Second World War ==
After the outbreak of the Second World War in September 1939, Stefania Wojtulanis volunteered for military service. Her flying experience with the Aero Club enabled her to carry out liaison flights, as a liaison officer, part of the Staff Squadron of the Commander-in-Chief of the Air Force, General Józef Zając. She flew liaison missions on an RWD-8 aircraft.

After the Soviet invasion of Poland on 17 September 1939, she evacuated to Romania with the Polish Air Force. Her mother and sister later died in the Warsaw Uprising. Until December 1939 she remained in Romania, where she served as a courier, travelling throughout the country and helping interned Polish airmen fleeing to France, delivering money and documents to them. She then made her way to France, where she was promoted to second lieutenant and worked in the air staff. After the fall of France in the summer of 1940, she made her way to the United Kingdom on the Polish liner Batory from Saint-Jean-de-Luz to Plymouth. Karpinska was assigned to the Polish Air Force Headquarters in London until later in 1940.

== Air Transport Auxiliary ==
On 1 January 1941, she and Anna Leska became the first two Polish women pilots to join the British Air Transport Auxiliary (ATA), which delivered aircraft from factories to the airfields of operational units, and damaged aircraft to repair factories or scrap yards. She was given the service number P-8523. On 30 January 1941 she qualified for a British flying licence at the ATA's Hatfield Aerodrome, flying a Tiger Moth and earning licence number 20290 (she held Polish licence number 467). She was known by her nickname Barbara whilst in the ATA. Wojtulanis and Leska were posted to No. 5 Ferry Pool at Hatfield.

The ATA service was arduous, with flights taking place without radio communications, navigation charts, often in poor weather conditions, and it also required her to learn to fly the various types of aircraft delivered, including twin-engine bombers such as the Vickers Wellington. She served in the ATA as a Pilot First Officer until 4 May 1945.

She was the first Polish woman to fly 1,000 hours on combat aircraft. She was promoted in the war to the rank of lieutenant pilot in wartime and then to the rank of captain pilot in wartime. After the war, Wojtulanis was demobilised from the Polish military in November 1947.

== Personal life ==
Stefania Wojtulanis married senior Polish air force General, Stanisław Karpiński on 6 June 1946. In 1958, she and her husband settled in Los Angeles, California, and applied for naturalisation in 1963. There she studied computer programming and worked as a data processing clerk and was involved in social activities, taking part in Polish immigrant and veteran organisations. She was president of the "Wings of the Pacific" Polish Airmen's Association in California and a member of other organisations, including the Women's Overseas League and Silver Wings Fraternity. She supported Polish museums and cultural and educational institutions.

Stefania Wojtulanis-Karpińska died in the Polish Retirement Home in Los Angeles on 12 February 2005.

== Awards and commemoration ==
She was decorated with the Polish Commander's Cross (2003) and Knight's Cross of the Order of Merit of the Republic of Poland, the Cross of Merit with Swords (for the 1939 campaign), the Silver Cross of Merit, the Cross of Combat Action of the Polish Armed Forces in the West, the medal "For Participation in the 1939 Defensive War", the Polish Air Medal four times and both the British War Medal and Defence Medal.

In 1993 the International Forest of Friendship in Kansas honoured her with a granite slab with her name and her own tree; the only one dedicated to a Polish aviator. In 1997 she was awarded the Polonia Mater Nostra Est Medal.

== Bibliography ==
- Henryk Karpiński Latanie było jej pasją – Stefania Cecylia Wojtulanis-Karpińska (1912–2005) w: „Przegląd Sił Powietrznych" kwiecień 2005
- Henryk Karpiński Kochała lotnictwo w: „Wiraże" 6/2005, s.24–25
