= San Francisco Review of Books =

Defunct book review periodical

- Charles Bukowski on the cover of the April 1979 issue.
- Categories: Book review
- Frequency: Monthly
- Founder: Ronald Nowicki
- First issue: April 1975; 51 years ago
- Final issue: 1997
- Company: San Francisco Review of Books
- Country: United States
- Based in: San Francisco, California
- Language: English
- ISSN: 0194-0724

San Francisco Review of Books (SFRB) was a book review periodical published from the mid-1970s to 1997 in the Bay Area, California, United States. Founding editor-publisher Ronald Nowicki launched his publication April 1975, a time when the San Francisco Chronicle depended on the wire services for its reviews. SFRB began as a magazine and later adopted a tabloid format.

In addition to the reviews and coverage of San Francisco's small press scene, SFRB offered interviews with such authors as Eric Ambler, Ann Beattie, Ray Bradbury, John Kenneth Galbraith, Herbert Gold, Elia Kazan, Jerzy Kosinski, William Kotzwinkle, Henry Miller, and Paul Theroux.

== Contributors ==
The roster of SFRB contributors included Alice Adams, Carolyn Burke, Alexander Chee, Peter Dreyer (interview with Henry Miller in the February 1977 issue), Lawrence Ferlinghetti, Thomas Gladysz, Stephen Greenblatt, Pam Houston, Diane Johnson, Emily Leider, Michael McDonagh, Leonard Michaels, Steven Moore, Ishmael Reed and Mary Elizabeth Williams. In addition to his editor's column, Nowicki also wrote occasional reviews. Susie Bright was a columnist from 1992 to 1994.

When 27-year-old Wendy Lesser, with no editing experience, was a guest editor in 1980, she found the experience so rewarding that three months later she launched her own publication, The Threepenny Review.

SFRB received little funding and had no backers, so it relied on a combination of advertising revenues, subscriptions, grants from the National Endowment for the Arts, and volunteers for financial support. Despite the limited funding, SFRB was published regularly under Nowicki's editorship until the late 1980s. When it was sold in 1989, Nowicki was retained as the editor for one year until a successor was installed. The publication continued well into the late 1990s with various owners, while Nowicki left to interview the last survivors of the Warsaw cabaret for his first book, Warsaw: The Cabaret Years (Mercury House, 1992), about cabaret and coffeehouse life between the wars in Warsaw. His articles have appeared in The New York Times, Newsweek, North American Review and other publications. Nowicki has been active in the Polish communities in San Francisco and London, where he currently lives.

== Archives ==
SFRB can be found in several major libraries, including the New York Public Library, the San Francisco Public Library, and the Library of the University of California at Berkeley.

== See also ==
- Granta
- Kirkus Reviews
- List of literary magazines
- Moody Street Irregulars
- Ploughshares
- Prairie Schooner
- The Massachusetts Review
- The New York Review of Books
- The Paris Review
- Transatlantic Review
- Utne Reader
