= Madeleine Masson =

South African-born British author

Madeleine Rayner (née Levy; 23 April 1912 – 23 August 2007), known professionally as Madeleine Masson, was a South African-born English-language author of plays, film scripts, novels, memoirs and biographies.

== Early life ==
Madeleine Masson was born Madeleine Levy in 1912 in Johannesburg to a French banker, Emile Levy, and Lili, "a ravishingly beautiful creature with Viennese antecedents". On a trip to Paris with her parents, 18-year-old Madeleine met 40-year-old Baron Renaud Marie de la Minaudière. As she put it in her autobiography, I Never Kissed Paris Goodbye, "I was a small-town South African who was being offered Prince Charming on a platter, decked with yachts, châteaux, sable coats, jewels, townhouses and a coat-of-arms equal to that of the Valois."

Madeleine took her surname "Masson" from one of the Baron's subsidiary titles. While pregnant with her first child, she was informed by the Baron's mistress – from whom she had mistakenly supposed he had parted – that not only were they still linked, but it was her fortune that paid for the Baron's elegant lifestyle. Any disturbance to their relations, it was made clear, would result in withdrawal of her support.

== Career ==
The shock of this revelation caused Masson to miscarry. She abandoned the aristocratic life and embraced Paris' bohemia, studied history and philosophy at the Sorbonne, art at Munich, wrote for the literary magazine, Les Nouvelles littéraires. She had an affair with a South African, became the lover of the Swiss painter Géa Augsbourg, got to know Pablo Picasso and André Breton, and met writers Colette and André Gide.

When World War II came, the Jewish-descended Masson left Géa Augsbourg, intending to return to South Africa. On the train to Bordeaux, she was persuaded to join the French Resistance. She later recalled this period, during which she carried messages and helped escapees, as a time of "total horror". In later years, she helped Tim Buckmaster, son of Maurice Buckmaster, head of SOE's F (French) Section, prepare a biography of his father.

== Personal life and writing ==
During a trip to visit Napoleon's tomb on Saint Helena, Masson met Captain John Rayner. After a courtship, they contracted a marriage that was to last 32 years.

While running the family home in Bosham, West Sussex, England, Masson started an early public relations firm. All the while, she wrote plays, film scripts, novels, memoirs, biographies. The most famous were her autobiography and her biographies of Edwina, Countess Mountbatten of Burma, and of the celebrated SOE agent Krystyna Skarbek (aka Christine Granville).

As late as spring 2007, Masson was busy revising an earlier novel about the German massacre on 10 June 1944 of the villagers of Oradour, near Limoges, France, and working on a biography of Baroness Emma Orczy, author of The Scarlet Pimpernel.

== Death ==
Madeleine Masson died on 23 August 2007, aged 95.

== Skarbek ==
Masson encountered one of her biographees, Krystyna Skarbek, during a voyage on the Winchester Castle in May–June 1952 from Cape Town, South Africa, to England to be reunited with her sea-captain future husband. She was intrigued by her stewardess, who "was polite, efficient and distant.... No warning bell rang... to tell me that twenty years later, waking and sleeping, I should try to recall every word, every intonation and every gesture of this woman." Nevertheless, landing at Southampton on 13 June, Masson inquired about the full name of her stewardess and was told that it was Christine Granville. A few days later, Masson was shocked to read in her morning paper that, on the night of 15 June, Christine Granville had been murdered in a London hotel. Subsequent days brought sensational stories about Krystyna Skarbek's (aka Christine Granville's) legendary wartime exploits and courage.

In subsequent years, as Masson sought to learn the fates of her prewar friends and wartime Resistance comrades-in-arms, she fortuitously met people who had known Skarbek and her partner Andrzej Kowerski ("Andrew Kennedy").

One of the strongest impressions I gained from listening to the talk of Christine's friends was that she hated any form of oppression, not only for patriotic reasons, but because she translated her own craving for freedom of thought and action into every human sphere. Anything that threatened her liberty or that of anyone else became a personal issue.

Masson's life story showed similarities to that of her biographee Skarbek. Both were descended from banker's families, had Jewish heritage and a bankrupt aristocrat in the family (Skarbek's father; Masson's first husband), and had worked during World War II with the French Resistance—Skarbek, under SOE sponsorship. This created a natural basis for the author's empathy with her subject. Masson sought out anyone who had known Skarbek and found her most complete informant in Kowerski. Her account of the information that she obtained from him is so detailed that it reads like a verbatim transcript of their conversations. To be sure, inaccuracies occasionally creep in, as when the author of the beautiful pastel sketch of Skarbek is identified as "Pavli Kowska" – it was in fact the work of Polish artist Aniela Pawlikowska (1901–80). But the essential accuracy of Masson's text is attested by collateral sources. Additionally, she sometimes faithfully presents information that she does not fully understand, including some Polish idioms that Skarbek (or Kowerski) translated metaphrastically – literally – into English.

== See also ==
- Krystyna Skarbek
- Poglish
