= Percy Hardy =

English cricketer (1880–1916)

Personal information
- Full name: Frederick Percy Hardy
- Born: 26 June 1880; Blandford Forum, Dorset, England
- Died: 9 March 1916 (aged 35); King's Cross railway station, London, England
- Batting: Left-handed
- Bowling: Right arm medium

Domestic team information
- Years: Team
- 1902–1914: Somerset

Career statistics
Competition	First-class
Matches	100
Runs scored	2,743
Batting average	16.32
100s/50s	0/7
Top score	91
Balls bowled	5,130
Wickets	91
Bowling average	35.34
5 wickets in innings	2
10 wickets in match	0
Best bowling	6/82
Catches/stumpings	41/–
- Source: CricketArchive, 22 December 2009

Frederick Percy Hardy (26 June 1880 – 9 March 1916) was a first-class cricketer who played for Somerset.

== Career ==
Hardy was a left-handed batsman who sometimes opened the innings and a right-arm medium-pace bowler. He played for Surrey's colts team, but left to join Somerset. He made his debut in 1902 and in his second match took the slip catch that dismissed Victor Trumper for just five – Trumper was dismissed a second time for five by the same bowler, George Gill, later in the match.

Hardy played as a professional in a mainly amateur team and made fairly regular appearances for Somerset right through to 1914. In 1910, when the side lost 15 out of 18 County Championship matches and failed to secure a single point all season, he headed the Somerset batting figures with 700 runs, including his own highest score of 91 against the champions, Kent, at Taunton. His best bowling figures, six for 82, also came in that season, against Middlesex at Bath.

== Death ==
Hardy's death is something of a mystery. He was, in the words of Wisden's 1917 edition, "found dead on the floor of a lavatory at King's Cross station (G.N.R.)... His throat was cut and a blood-stained knife was by his side." Hardy was serving as a private with the 3rd County of London Yeomanry (Sharpshooters) at the time. The historian David Foot wrote that the knife was Hardy's own and that the death was suicide brought on by distress at being sent back to the World War I battlefield. Hardy, who left a widow, Maud Mary, was buried at St Mary's Catholic Cemetery, Kensal Green.
