= Krystyna Skarbek =

Polish World War II spy (1908–1952)

Krystyna Skarbek OBE, GM
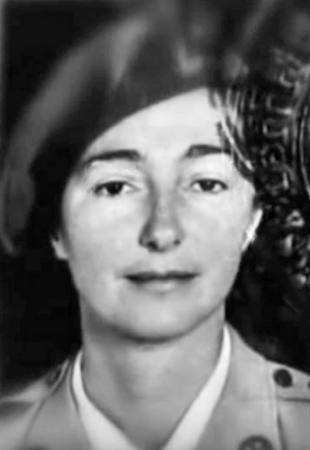
- Skarbek donned a FANY uniform for the only time in her life for this photo.
- Born: Maria Krystyna Janina Skarbek; 1 May 1908; Warsaw, Congress Poland, Russian Empire
- Died: 15 June 1952 (aged 44); Lexham Gardens, Earls Court, England
- Cause of death: Murder by stabbing
- Resting place: St Mary's Catholic Cemetery, Kensal Green, northwest London.
- Other names: Krystyna Gettlich; Krystyna Giżycka; Christine Granville
- Occupation: Special Operations Executive (SOE) agent
- Years active: 1939–1945
- Spouses: Gustaw Gettlich (m. 1930, divorced) Jerzy Giżycki (m. 1938; div. 1946)
- Partner: Andrzej Kowerski
- Parent(s): Count Jerzy Skarbek; Countess Stefania (nee Goldfeder).
- Relatives: Andrzej Skarbek (cousin); Stefan Skarbek (cousin); Sacha Skarbek (cousin)

Maria Krystyna Janina Skarbek, OBE, GM (Polish pronunciation: [krɨˈstɨna ˈskarbɛk], /krɪstiːnə skɑːrbɛk/; 1 May 1908 (Note: The deceptions and confusions that surround Christine's life start with her birth.... In fact [she] arrived in the world on Friday 1 May 1908.) (Note: In January 1941, when Britain's ambassador to Budapest, Sir Owen O'Malley, produced passports in false names for Skarbek and her partner Andrzej Kowerski, the two Poles chose the names "Christine Granville" and "Andrew Kennedy". Skarbek "took the opportunity to knock seven years off her age. From then on [she] would always give 1915 as her birth year.) – 15 June 1952), also known as Christine Granville, was a Polish agent of the British Special Operations Executive (SOE) during the Second World War. She became celebrated for her daring exploits in intelligence and irregular-warfare missions in Nazi-occupied Poland and France. Journalist Alistair Horne, who described himself in 2012 as one of the few people still alive who had known Skarbek, called her the "bravest of the brave". Spymaster Vera Atkins of the SOE described Skarbek as "very brave, very attractive, but a loner and a law unto herself".

She became a British agent months before the SOE was founded in July 1940. She was the first female agent of the British to serve in the field, and the longest-serving of all Britain's wartime women agents. Her resourcefulness and success have been credited with influencing the organisation's decision to recruit more women as agents in Nazi-occupied countries. In 1941 she began using the alias Christine Granville, a name she legally adopted upon naturalisation as a British subject in December 1946.

Skarbek's most famous exploit was securing the release of SOE agents Francis Cammaerts and Xan Fielding from a German prison hours before they were to be executed. She did so by meeting (at great personal risk) with the Gestapo commander in Digne-les-Bains, France, telling him she was a British agent, and persuading him with threats, lies, and a two million franc bribe to release them. The event is fictionalised in the last episode of the British television show Wish Me Luck.

Skarbek is often characterised in terms such as Britain's "most glamorous spy" or "Churchill's favourite spy". She was stabbed to death in 1952 in London by an obsessed and spurned suitor who was subsequently hanged.

== Early life ==
The Skarbeks' Habdank coat-of-arms

Krystyna Skarbek was born in 1908 in Warsaw, the second child of Count Jerzy Skarbek, a Roman Catholic, and Stefania (née Goldfeder), the daughter of a wealthy assimilated Jewish family. Marrying Stefania in late December 1899, Jerzy Skarbek used his wife's dowry (her father was a banker) to pay his debts and continue his lavish lifestyle.

Notable relations included Fryderyk Skarbek, prison reformer, and Włodzimierz Krzyżanowski, United States Union general. Skarbek was distantly related to the Hungarian regent, Admiral Miklós Horthy, as a cousin from the Lwów side of the family had married a relative of Horthy.

Krystyna took after her father and his liking for riding horses, which she sat astride rather than side-saddle as was usual for women. She also became an expert skier during visits to Zakopane in the Tatra Mountains of southern Poland. At the family stables, she met Andrzej Kowerski, whose father had brought him over to play with ten-year-old Krystyna while he and her father discussed agricultural matters.

The 1920s left the family in straitened financial circumstances, and they had to give up their country estate and move to Warsaw. In 1930, when she was 22, Count Jerzy died. The Goldfeder financial empire had almost completely collapsed, and there was barely enough money to support the widowed Countess Stefania. Krystyna, not wishing to be a burden to her mother, worked at a Fiat car dealership, but soon became ill from automobile fumes and had to give up the job. At first she was thought, on the basis of shadows on her chest x-rays, to be suffering from tuberculosis, which had killed her father. She received compensation from her employer's insurance company and took her physicians' advice to lead as much of an open-air life as she could. She began spending a great deal of time hiking and skiing the Tatra Mountains. In 1930, she was a runner up in the Miss Poland beauty contest.

On 21 April 1930, she married a young businessman, Gustaw Gettlich, at the Spiritual Seminary Church in Warsaw. They proved incompatible, and the marriage soon ended without rancour. A subsequent love affair came to naught when the young man's mother refused to consider the penniless divorcée as a potential daughter-in-law.

One day, she lost control on a Zakopane ski slope and was saved by Jerzy Giżycki, who stepped into her path and stopped her descent. Giżycki came from a wealthy family in Kamieniec Podolski (formerly Poland, at the time the Soviet Union). At fourteen, he had quarrelled with his father, run away from home, and worked in the United States as a cowboy and gold prospector. He eventually became an author and travelled the world in search of material for his books and articles. He knew Africa well and hoped one day to return there. The two were married on 2 November 1938 at the Evangelical Reformed Church in Warsaw. Soon after, he accepted a diplomatic posting to Ethiopia, where he served as Poland's consul general until September 1939, when Germany invaded Poland. She later said of Giżycki: "He was my Svengali for so many years that he would never believe that I could ever leave him for good."

== World War II ==
=== London ===
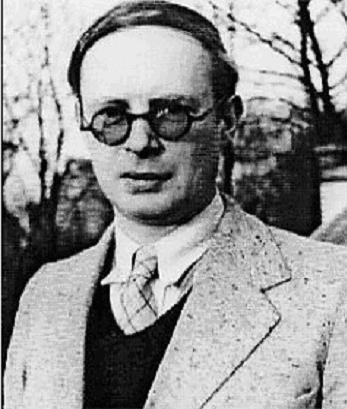
Journalist Frederick Voigt introduced Skarbek to SIS

Upon the outbreak of World War II, the couple sailed for London, arriving 6 October 1939, where Skarbek sought to offer her services in the struggle against the common enemy. The British authorities showed little interest but were eventually convinced by her acquaintances, including journalist Frederick Augustus Voigt, who introduced her to the Secret Intelligence Service (SIS). The first SIS mention of her was in December 1939. She was described as a "flaming Polish patriot, expert skier, and great adventuress" and "absolutely fearless".

=== Hungary and Poland ===
From London Skarbek, now a British agent, journeyed to Budapest, Hungary, arriving on 21 December 1939. Hungary was not yet a participant in World War II, but was leaning toward Nazi Germany. Skarbek's cover story for her presence in Hungary was that she was a journalist.

She persuaded Polish Olympic skier Jan Marusarz, brother of Nordic skier Stanisław Marusarz, to escort her across the snow-covered Tatra Mountains into Nazi-occupied Poland. Arriving in Warsaw, she pleaded vainly with her mother to leave Poland. Stefania Skarbek refused; she was determined to stay in Warsaw to continue teaching French to small children. In January 1942, Stefania was arrested by the Germans as a Jew and disappeared into Warsaw's Pawiak prison. The prison had been designed in the mid-19th century by Skarbek's great-great-uncle Fryderyk Skarbek, a prison reformer and Frédéric Chopin's godfather, who had been tutored in the French language by Chopin's father.

In February 1940, while working in her occupied homeland, she was hailed at a cafe in Warsaw by a woman acquaintance: "Krystyna! Krystyna Skarbek! What are you doing here? We heard that you'd gone abroad!" When Skarbek denied that was her name, the woman found her denial hard to believe. To minimise suspicion, Skarbek tarried a while before leaving the café.

In Hungary, Skarbek encountered Andrzej Kowerski (1912–1988), now a Polish army officer, who later used the British nom de guerre "Andrew Kennedy". Skarbek had first met him as a child and briefly encountered him again before the war at Zakopane. Kowerski, who had lost part of his leg in a pre-war hunting accident, was now exfiltrating Polish and other Allied military personnel and collecting intelligence.

Skarbek helped organise a system of Polish couriers who brought intelligence reports from Warsaw to Budapest. Kowerski (Kennedy)'s cousin, Ludwik Popiel, managed to smuggle out a unique Polish anti-tank rifle, model 35, with the stock and barrel sawn off for easier transport. Skarbek, for a time, concealed it in her Budapest apartment. However, it never saw wartime service with the Allies, as the designs and specifications had deliberately been destroyed upon the outbreak of war and there was no time for reverse engineering. Captured stocks of the rifle were, however, used by the Germans and the Italians.

At the request of MI6, she and Kowerski organised surveillance of all the rail, road and river traffic on the borders with Romania and Germany. She is credited with providing intelligence on oil transports to Germany from Romania's Ploiesti oilfields.

Skarbek spent 1940 travelling back and forth between Poland and Hungary. In Budapest, in January 1941, she and Kowerski were arrested by the Hungarian police and imprisoned and questioned by the Gestapo. She feigned symptoms of pulmonary tuberculosis by biting her tongue until it bled and a doctor diagnosed her incorrectly with terminal tuberculosis. The Germans released them, but the couple was followed by the police afterwards and they decided to flee Hungary, a German ally.

=== Car journey ===
The British Ambassador in Hungary, Owen O'Malley, and his wife, the novelist Ann Bridge, undertook to help Skarbek and Kowerski escape Hungary. O'Malley issued British passports to them. Kowerski became "Anthony Kennedy", and Skarbek became "Christine Granville", a name she used for the rest of her life. She also shaved seven years off her age; her passport gave her birth date as 1915. A British Embassy driver smuggled Skarbek out of Hungary and into Yugoslavia in the trunk of O'Malley's Chrysler. Kowerski, a.k.a. Kennedy, drove his Opel across the border. The couple reunited in Yugoslavia and O'Malley joined them later in Belgrade, where they enjoyed a few days of "drinking champagne in ... nightclubs and belly-dancing bars". In late February, Skarbek and Kowerski continued their journey in the Opel, first to Sofia, Bulgaria. Sofia's best hotel "was full of Nazis". Skarbek and Kowerski called at the British Legation, meeting with air attaché Aidan Crawley. The couple gave Crawley rolls of microfilm which they had received from a Polish intelligence organisation called the "Musketeers". The microfilm contained photos of a German military buildup near the border with the Soviet Union, indicating that a German invasion of the Soviet Union was being planned. The microfilm was sent to Prime Minister Winston Churchill in London, who could scarcely believe it; but by March, with information from other sources, the Prime Minister was persuaded that Skarbek and Kowerski's intelligence was accurate. The Germans invaded the Soviet Union in June 1941.

Leaving Bulgaria, Kowerski and Skarbek continued on to Turkey. In Istanbul, they met with exiled Poles, and Skarbek tried to ensure that the courier routes from Istanbul to Poland remained functional. Skarbek's husband, Jerzy Giżycki, met them in Istanbul on 17 March 1941. Apparently no fireworks ensued when he met Kowerski, and they persuaded him to go to Budapest to take over Skarbek's previous role as the contact point for the British with the Polish resistance. The couple's next destinations in the Opel were Syria and Lebanon, which were under the control of Vichy France. Skarbek obtained visas from reluctant Vichy officials and they continued their journey. They then entered Mandatory Palestine and proceeded onward to Cairo, Egypt, arriving in May 1941. Skarbek and Kowerski "had driven fairly blithely across hundreds of miles of Nazi-sympathizing territory, often carrying incriminating letters and sometimes microfilm and just weeks or at times days ahead of the Nazi advance."

=== Cairo ===
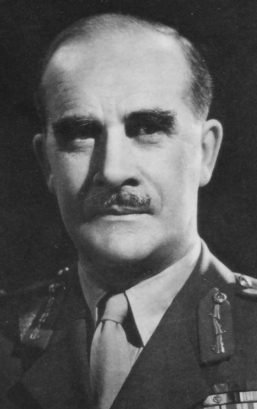
Gen. Colin Gubbins, executive head of SOE from 1943

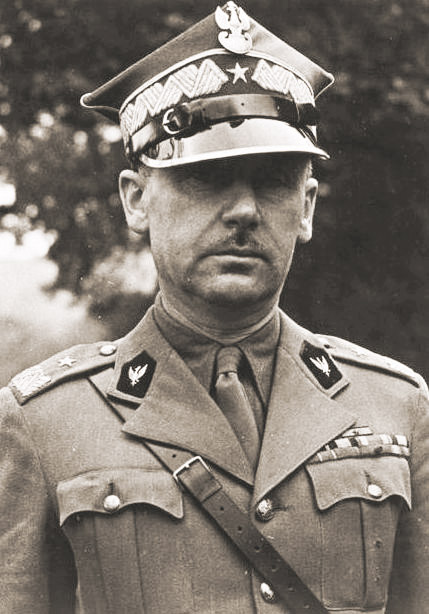
Gen. Stanisław Kopański, Chief of Staff to the Commander-in-Chief of the Polish Armed Forces in the West (1943–46)

Upon their arrival at SOE offices in Cairo, Kowerski and Skarbek learned they were under suspicion because of Skarbek's contacts with the Polish intelligence organisation, the Musketeers. This group had been formed in October 1939 by engineer-inventor Stefan Witkowski. (Note: Clare Mulley wrote: "Recruiting many former officers from the anti-tank rifle (model 35) – or 'musket' – unit, with which he [Stefan Witkowski] had briefly served, he established an intelligence organization known, not very cryptically, as the Musketeers." (Witkowski would be assassinated by parties unknown in October 1942.)) Another source of suspicion was the ease with which she had obtained transit visas through French-mandated Syria and Lebanon from the pro-Vichy French consul in Istanbul. Only German spies, some Polish intelligence officers believed, could have obtained the visas.

There were also specific suspicions about Kowerski. These were addressed in London by General Colin Gubbins – to be, from September 1943, head of SOE – in a letter of 17 June 1941 to Polish Commander-in-Chief and the Prime Minister of Poland Władysław Sikorski:

Last year […] a Polish citizen named Kowerski was working with our officials in Budapest on Polish affairs. He is now in Palestine […]. I understand from Major Wilkinson of SOE that General Kopański [Kowerski's former commander in Poland] is doubtful about Kowerski's loyalty to the Polish cause [because] Kowerski has not reported to General Kopański for duty with the Brigade. Major Wilkinson informs me that Kowerski had had instructions from our officials not to report to General Kopański, as he was engaged […] on work of a secret nature which necessitated his remaining apart. It seems therefore that Kowerski's loyalty has only been called into question because of these instructions.

In June 1941, Peter Wilkinson of SOE came to Cairo and officially dismissed Skarbek and Kowerski, although keeping them on the SOE payroll with a small retainer that forced them to live in near poverty. Kowerski, who was under less suspicion than Skarbek, eventually cleared up any misunderstandings with General Kopański and was able to resume intelligence work.

When Skarbek's husband, Jerzy Giżycki, was informed that Skarbek and Kowerski's services were being dispensed with, he took umbrage and abruptly bowed out of his own career as a British intelligence agent. When Skarbek told her husband that she loved Kowerski, Giżycki left for London, eventually emigrating to Canada. (The couple were formally divorced at the Polish consulate in Berlin on 1 August 1946.)

A week after the dismissal of Skarbek and Kowerski, on 22 June 1941 Germany began its Operation Barbarossa invasion of the Soviet Union, predicted by the intelligence the couple had passed along to the British from the Musketeers. It is now known that advance information about Operation Barbarossa had also been provided by a number of other sources, including Ultra.

During the remainder of 1941, 1942, and 1943, Skarbek was given several small tasks by SOE, such as intelligence gathering in Syria and Cairo, including passing along information to the British on Polish intelligence and resistance agencies. She turned down offers of office work and continued to be sidelined from the kind of dangerous and difficult work she desired. Both she and Kowerski continued to be under suspicion by the British and resented by the Polish government-in-exile because they worked for Britain.

=== Training ===
Skarbek's route back to active service with SOE began with her joining the First Aid Nursing Yeomanry (FANY), an all-woman charity organisation with military-style uniforms that was used as a cover for many women in the SOE. The SOE officer who recruited her, Patrick Howarth, later said jokingly that "the most useful thing I did in World War II was to reinstate Christine Granville". Her briefing officer in FANY, Gwendolin Lees, was so impressed by Skarbek (now more commonly known as Granville) that she later named a daughter after her. Despite Skarbek's experience in clandestine work, she was given SOE training for prospective agents. She proved to be very bad at wireless transmitting and hated firearms training, but she loved parachuting.

SOE's original plan to parachute Skarbek into Hungary was cancelled because the mission was deemed "little short of homicide." The continued suspicions about her by the Polish government-in-exile precluded a return to Poland. Thus, SOE decided to infiltrate her into southern France. Her French was good and she took a course to improve her English. She moved to Algeria in preparation for a mission to France, but she was not immediately dispatched because SOE believed she was "too flamboyant to work undercover effectively".

=== France ===
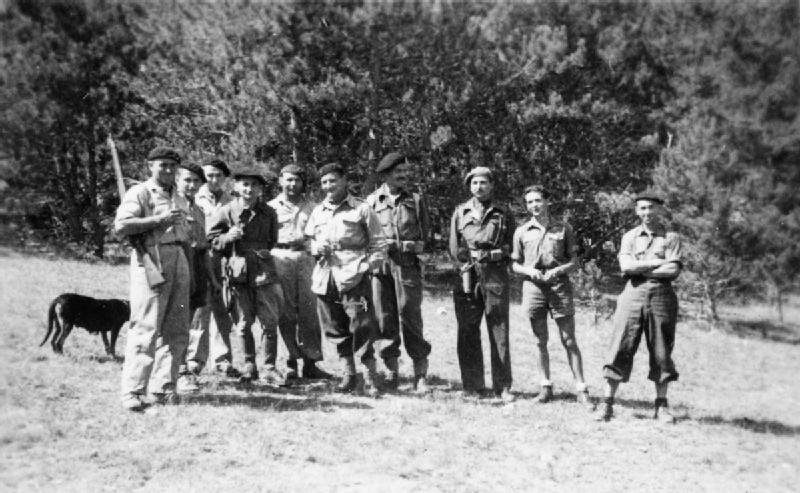
Maquisards (Resistance fighters) in the vicinity of Savournon in the Hautes-Alpes in August 1944. SOE agents are second from right, (possibly) Skarbek, third John Roper, fourth, Robert Purvis.

The SOE had several branches working in France. Though most of the women in France answered to F Section in London, Skarbek's mission was launched from Algiers, the base of AMF Section. This section was only set up in the wake of Operation Torch, the Allied landings in North Africa, partly with staff from London (F Section) and partly with staff from Cairo (MO.4). AMF Section served three purposes: it was simpler and safer to run the resupply operations from Allied North Africa than from London, across German-occupied France; the South of France was to be liberated by separate Allied landings there (Operation Dragoon), so SOE units in the area needed be supplied by their headquarters in Algiers, not by London; and AMF Section tapped into the skills of the French living in North Africa. With the two invasions in Normandy and southern France in late spring and summer 1944, these distinctions became irrelevant, and almost all the SOE Sections in France were united with the Maquis into the Forces Francaises de l'Interieur (FFI). (There was one exception: The EU/P Section, which was formed by Poles in France and remained part of the trans-European Polish Resistance movement, under Polish command.)

Skarbek, now more commonly known as Christine Granville, parachuted into France on the night of 6/7 July 1944. She became part of the Jockey network headed by Francis Cammaerts, Belgian-British in nationality and a former pacifist. The job of Cammaerts and his team was to organise the French resistance fighters, the maquis, in southeastern France to weaken the German occupiers prior to the Allied invasion of southern France, Operation Dragoon, which would take place on 15 August. Skarbek was Cammaerts's courier, replacing Cecily Lefort, who had been captured by the Germans and would be executed. She was also given the task of attempting to subvert the Polish conscripts in the German army who were stationed along the Franco-Italian border.

Vercors Plateau. Cammaerts was based in the hamlet of Saint-Julien-en-Vercors on the remote Vercors Plateau. Skarbek arrived in the midst of a large operation headed by British major Desmond Longe of supplying by parachute the local maquis with arms and supplies. She was out every moonlit night organising a reception committee to collect the canisters dropped by Allied aeroplanes on the plateau. On the morning of 14 July came a daylight drop of light arms and supplies from 72 American B-17s, the largest single-day airdrop to the maquis during World War II. Encouraged by a speech from the head of the provisional government, Charles de Gaulle, (but discouraged by Cammaerts who opposed large-scale guerrilla operations and pleaded unsuccessfully for artillery and anti-tank weapons for the maquis), a full-scale rebellion against the German occupiers broke out. The rebellion was premature and quickly crushed by German troops. On 22 July and under fire, Cammaerts and Skarbek escaped from the plateau, setting up a new base at Seyne-les-Alpes.

In the Alps. After the flight from the Vercors, Skarbek embarked on a journey of three weeks through the Alps, mostly on foot (she disliked bicycles). She carried a rucksack filled with food and hand grenades. She made contact with two prominent leaders of the French Resistance, Gilbert Galletti and Paul Hérault (soon to be killed by the Germans), and greeted the arrival of an "Operation Toplink" team which included her friends John Roper, Paddy O'Regan, and Harvard Gunn. Their job was to organise and supply both the French and Italian resistance along the border. On 13 August, she subverted some of the Polish soldiers among the German units in the Alps. After a two-day hike to the Col de Larche, a prominent mountain pass on the Franco-Italian border, she approached a formidable fortress, manned by 150 soldiers, at the head of the pass. Speaking in Polish and revealing her identity, she talked to the 63 Polish soldiers - Volksdeutsche, i.e., Poles who had signed the Nazi Volksliste as those whose language and culture had German origins but who did not hold German citizenship - among the defenders, and told them, when the order was given by resistance forces, to desert and destroy the fortress, giving them specific instructions on how that was to be done. Six days later a small force of maquis and two Operation Toplink officers, John Roper and John Halsey, approached the garrison and the German commander surrendered the fortress and his mutinous soldiers. The Poles in the garrison joined the French resistance as Skarbek had told them to do.

Rescuing Cammaerts. On 13 August 1944, at Digne, two days before the Allied Operation Dragoon landings in southern France, Cammaerts, Xan Fielding – another SOE agent, who had previously operated in Crete – and a French officer, Christian Sorensen, were arrested at a roadblock by the Gestapo. Skarbek rushed back from the Col de Larche, halting briefly along the way to meet a recently arrived 10-man allied military mission. She told them that, in Cammaerts's absence, she was in charge and arranged transportation for them. She also tried without success to persuade French resistance leaders to storm the prison in Digne and rescue Cammaerts and the others. She then put aside her aversion to bicycles, and cycled 40 kilometres (25 mi) to Digne.

In Digne on 15 August, Skarbek circled the walls of the prison humming "Frankie and Johnny", a favourite tune of hers and Cammaerts. He responded in kind, confirming that he was within. Skarbek managed to meet with Captain Albert Schenck, an Alsatian who acted as liaison officer between the local French prefecture and the Gestapo. She introduced herself as Cammaerts's wife and a niece of British General Bernard Montgomery and threatened Schenck with terrible retribution if harm came to the prisoners. She reinforced the threat with a mercenary appeal – an offer of two million francs for the men's release.

Skarbek informed SOE in London and two million francs were air-dropped to her. On 17 August she was back in Schenck's office, money in hand. The Allied invasion of southern France had occurred on 15 August, and Allied soldiers were 60 kilometres (37 miles) distant and advancing rapidly toward Digne, a fact that was apparent to the Germans and their French collaborators. Schenck introduced her to a Gestapo officer, Max Waem, a Belgian, with the authority to order the release of the SOE agents. She met him in Schenck's apartment at four in the afternoon.

For three hours Christine argued and bargained with him and, having turned the full force of her magnetic personality on him... told him that the Allies would be arriving at any moment and that she, a British parachutist, was in constant wireless contact with the British forces. To make her point, she produced some broken... useless W/T crystals.... 'If I were you,' said Christine, 'I should give careful thought to the proposition I have made you. As I told Capitaine Schenck, if anything should happen to my husband [as she falsely described Cammaerts] or to his friends, the reprisals would be swift and terrible, for I don't have to tell you that both you and the Capitaine have an infamous reputation among the locals.' Increasingly alarmed by the thought of what might befall him when the Allies and the Resistance decided to avenge the many murders he had committed, Waem struck the butt end of his revolver on the table and said, 'If I do get them out of prison, what will you do to protect me?'

That evening, Cammaerts, Fielding, and Sorensen were marched out of the prison by Waem, dressed in his SS uniform. They anticipated they were on the way to their execution, but instead Waem led them to an automobile and they were driven to the outskirts of Digne where Skarbek was waiting for them. She got into the automobile without a nod of recognition and they thought that she too was a prisoner. They drove to the bank of a river where Fielding helped Waem bury his SS tunic. It was only then that he realised that they were being released, not executed. Several years later, Skarbek told another Pole and fellow World War II veteran that, during her negotiations with the Gestapo, she had been unaware of any danger to herself. Only after she and her comrades had made good their escape did it hit home: "What have I done! They could have shot me as well."

After Cammaerts and the other two men were released, Schenck was advised to leave Digne. He did not and was subsequently murdered by a person or persons unknown. His wife kept the bribe money and, after the war, attempted to exchange it for new francs. She was arrested but was released after the authorities investigated her story. She was able to exchange the money for only a tiny portion of its value. Cammaerts and Skarbek helped her return to her home. Skarbek had promised Waem he would not be arrested by the British, and battled with SOE leaders with some success to protect him. He survived the war and returned to Belgium.

Cammaerts named his daughter Christine (born 1948) after her. The story of Skarbeks's bribe is fictionalised in the last episode of the television series Wish Me Luck.

Operation Dragoon. Digne was liberated by the American army two days after Skarbek rescued Cammaerts, Fielding, and Sorensen. The maquis had cleared the way for the Americans and there was little opposition. Cammaerts and Skarbek met the American commander, Brigadier General Frederic B. Butler, at Sisteron on 20 August. They offered their help but he dismissed them as "bandits". No respecter of rank, Skarbek was furious and had to be calmed down by an aide to the general. Leaving the American army behind, the two proceeded to Gap where the maquis had captured the German garrison. Several hundred Poles, conscripted soldiers in the German army, were among the captured Germans. Skarbek addressed the Poles with a megaphone and secured their agreement to join the Allied forces, provided that they shed their German uniforms. The Poles stripped off their uniforms. General Butler arrived and disapproved of the proceedings, threatening Skarbek and Cammaerts with arrest and court martial if they did not leave. Later, they had a better reception from Butler's superior officer, General Alexander Patch, who appointed them as the liaison for the Americans with the maquis. The couple continued northward to Lyon and Paris. In September Skarbek took a military flight to London.

=== Conclusion of duties ===
Skarbek, c. 1950

When the SOE teams returned from France (or in some cases, were given 24 hours to depart by de Gaulle) in autumn 1944, some of the British women sought new missions in the Pacific War, where the war with the Empire of Japan continued; but Skarbek, as a Pole, was ideally placed to serve as a courier for missions to her homeland. As the Red Army advanced across Poland, the British government and Polish government-in-exile worked together to leave a network in place that would report on events in the People's Republic of Poland. Kowerski and Skarbek were now fully reconciled with the Polish forces and were preparing to be dropped into Poland in early 1945. However, the mission, called Operation Freston, was cancelled because the first party to enter Poland were captured by the Red Army (they were released in February 1945).

The women of SOE were all given military rank, with honorary commissions in either the Women's Transport Service, the First Aid Nursing Yeomanry (FANY), officially part of the Auxiliary Territorial Service (ATS) though a very elite and autonomous part, or the Women's Auxiliary Air Force (WAAF). In preparation for her service in France, she had been a member of the FANY. On her return, she transferred to the WAAF as a flight officer until the end of the war in Europe: 21 November 1944 to 14 May 1945.

== Honours and awards ==
Skarbek's exploits were recognised with award of the George Medal.

For her work in conjunction with the British authorities, in May 1947 she was made an Officer of the Order of the British Empire (OBE), an award normally associated with officers of the equivalent military rank of lieutenant colonel, and a level above the most usual award of Member of the Order of the British Empire (MBE) given to other women agents of SOE. Despite her problems with the Poles during the war, in 1945 when Skarbek visited Polish military headquarters in her British WAAF uniform, she was treated by the Polish military chiefs with the highest respect.

French recognition of Skarbek's contribution to the liberation of France came with the award of the Croix de Guerre.

Officer of the Order of the British Empire	George Medal	1939–1945 Star	Africa Star
Italy Star	France and Germany Star	War Medal	Croix de Guerre (France)

== Postwar life ==
After the war, Skarbek was left without financial reserves or a native country to return to. Xan Fielding, whom she had saved from execution by the Gestapo, wrote in his 1954 book, Hide and Seek, dedicated "To the memory of Christine Granville":

After the physical hardship and mental strain she had suffered for six years in our service, she needed, probably more than any other agent we had employed, security for life. […] Yet a few weeks after the armistice she was dismissed with a month's salary and left in Cairo to fend for herself... though she was too proud to ask for any other assistance, she did apply for the protection of a British passport; for ever since the Anglo-American betrayal of her country at Yalta she had been virtually stateless. But the naturalization papers […] were delayed in the normal bureaucratic manner. Meanwhile, abandoning all hope of security, she embarked on a life of uncertain travel, as though anxious to reproduce in peace time the hazards she had known during the war...

She was ultimately naturalised in December 1946 after returning to Britain and threatening to refuse her George Medal and OBE.

Unable to find work, Skarbek went to Nairobi, Kenya Colony to join Michael Dunford, an old lover, but the British colonial government turned down her application for a work permit. She returned to London where she became in turn a telephone operator, a salesperson, a waitress, and a cabin steward on ocean liners. On one of the passenger ships, the Ruahine, the crew, including Skarbek, were required to wear any medals they had been awarded during the war. Skarbek's "impressive line of ribbons, enough to flatter a general", led to resentment among the crew and accusations of lying. A fellow steward, Dennis George Muldowney, defended her, and the two probably were lovers. Muldowney became obsessed with her, and she broke off with him, saying he was "obstinate and terrifying".

== Death and legacy ==
Christine Granville was stabbed to death in the Shellbourne Hotel, 1 Lexham Gardens, Earls Court, in London, on 15 June 1952. She had begun work as a stewardess some six weeks earlier with the Union-Castle Line and had booked into the hotel on 14 June, having returned from a working voyage out of Durban, South Africa, on Winchester Castle. Her body was identified by her cousin Andrzej Skarbek. When her death was recorded at the Royal Borough of Kensington's register office, her age was given as 37, the age she claimed on her British passport. Her assailant was Dennis Muldowney, the obsessed man who had worked with her as a steward on Ruahine and was at the time of her murder a Reform Club porter. After being convicted of her murder, Muldowney was hanged at HMP Pentonville on 30 September 1952.

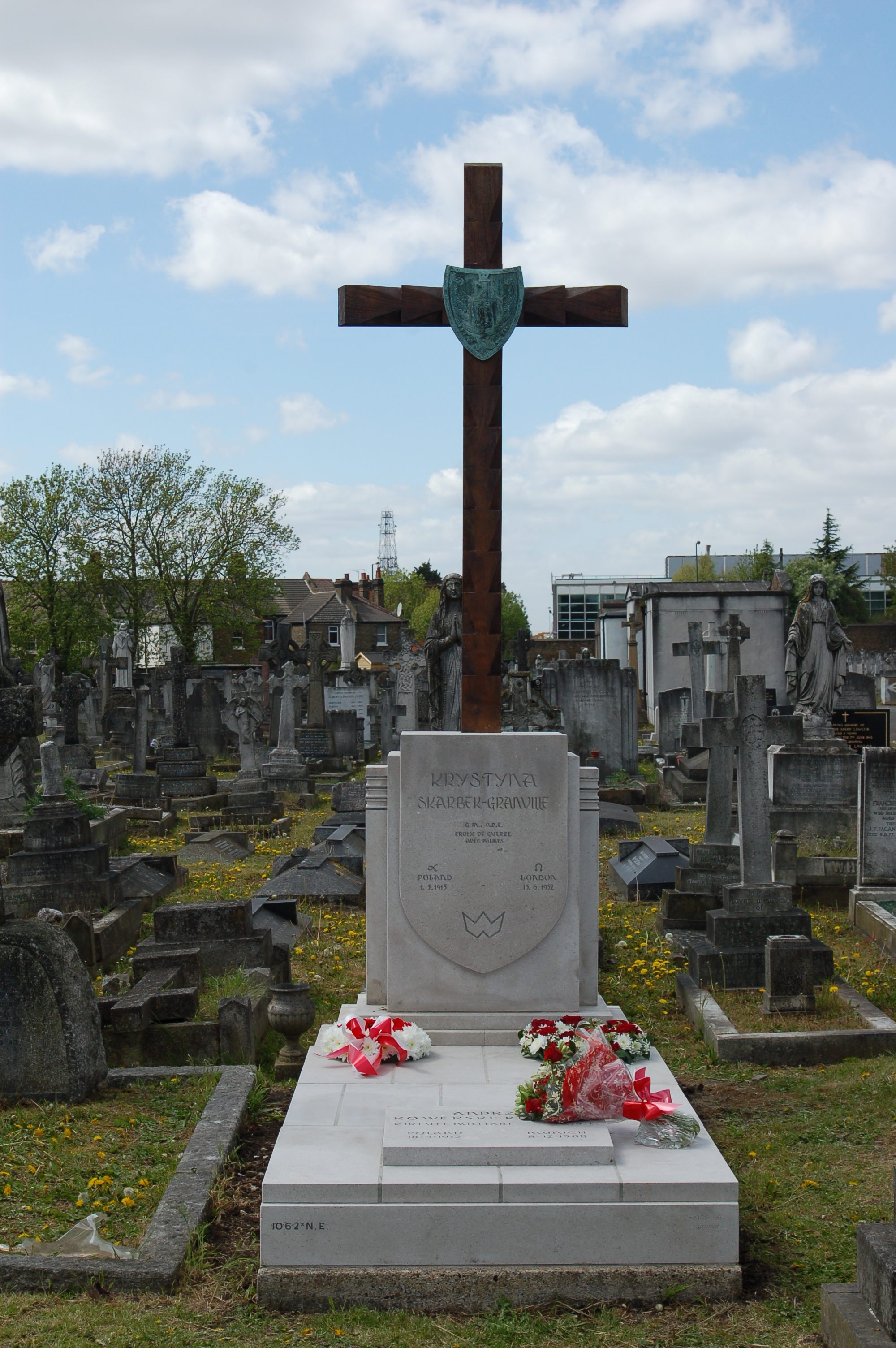
Skarbek's grave, St Mary's Catholic Cemetery, Kensal Green, London, with Andrzej Kowerski, her partner in life and SOE service

Granville was interred in St Mary's Catholic Cemetery, Kensal Green, northwest London. In 2013, a ceremony marked the renovation of her grave by the Polish Heritage Society.

Following Granville's death, Andrzej Kowerski (Andrew Kennedy) led a group of men, especially Cammaerts, Roper, and Patrick Howarth, dedicated to ensuring that her name not be "sullied" and successfully prevented publication in newspapers and books of "rubbish" about her, which biographer Madeleine Masson interpreted as meaning stories of her sex life. Masson eventually received the support of the group to publish a "scrubbed" version of Granville's life. Kowerski/Kennedy died of cancer in Munich, Germany in December 1988. His ashes were flown to London and interred at the foot of Skarbek's grave.

In 1971, the Shellbourne Hotel was bought by a Polish group; in a storeroom, they found Skarbek's trunk, containing her clothes, papers, and SOE issue dagger. This dagger, her medals, and some of her papers are now held in the Polish Institute and Sikorski Museum at 20 Prince's Gate, Kensington, London.

In May 2017, a bronze bust by Ian Wolter was unveiled at the Polish Hearth Club (Ognisko Polskie) in Kensington, London.

In 2020, English Heritage announced that it would place a blue plaque honouring Skarbek at the site of the former Shellbourne Hotel. The plaque was unveiled in September 2020, six years after Granville's biographer Clare Mulley had proposed the plaque to English Heritage.

In 2023, the newly opened Raffles Hotel in London named one of its most lavish suites The Granville Suite as a tribute to her.

== Popular culture and biographies ==
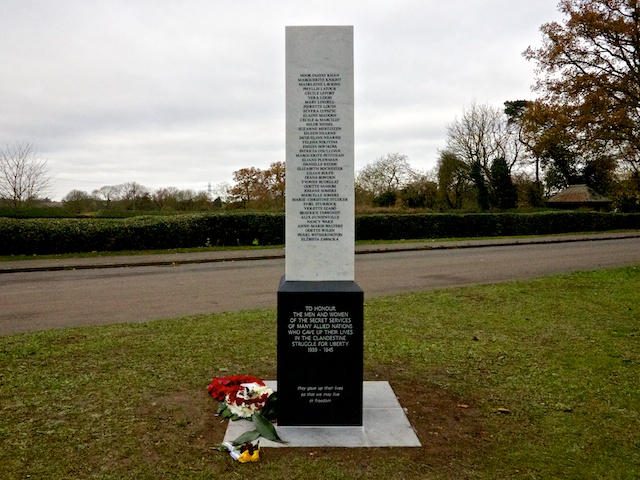
Tempsford Memorial to the female agents and RAF Special Squadrons, among them Krystyna Skarbek

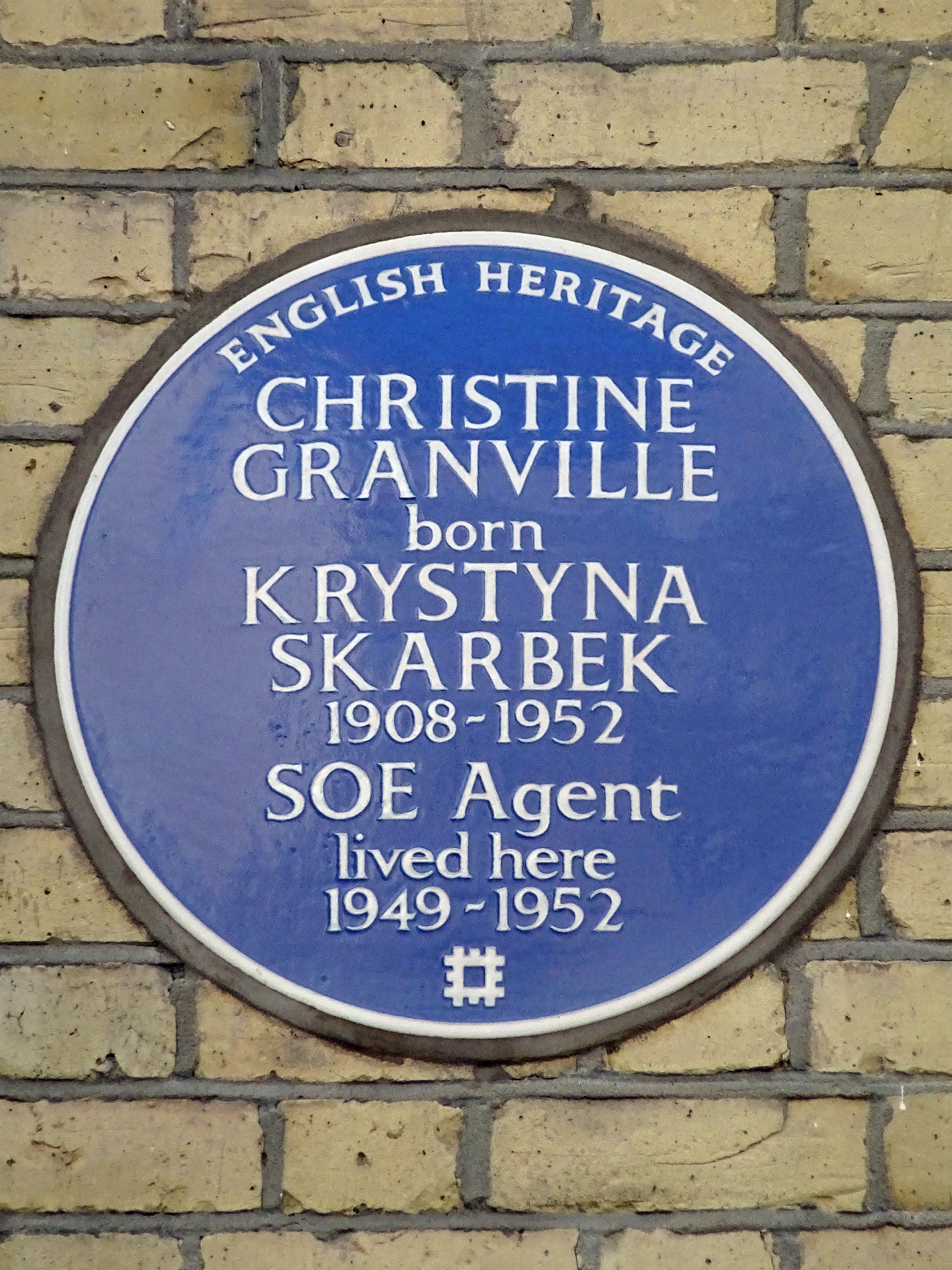

As Skarbek's life became so wildly reported, Kowerski/Kennedy asked their mutual friend W. Stanley Moss to write something definitive; a series of four illustrated articles by Moss were published in Picture Post in 1952.

There have been four published biographies of Skarbek:

- Madeleine Masson, Christine: a Search for Christine Granville, OBE, GM, Croix de Guerre, 1975; republished 2005, ISBN 978-0241892749
- Jan Larecki, Krystyna Skarbek, Agentka o wielu twarzach (Krystyna Skarbek, Agent of Many Faces), 2008, ISBN 978-83-05-13533-7.
- Clare Mulley, The Spy Who Loved: The Secrets and Lives of Christine Granville, Britain's first female special agent of the Second World War, Macmillan, 2012, ISBN 978-1-4472-2565-2
- Ronald Nowicki, The Elusive Madame G, 2013, ISBN 978-1-4949-3697-6

On 3 May 2016 BBC Radio 4 broadcast an episode of Great Lives in which Krystyna Skarbek's life was proposed by Lt General Sir Graeme Lamb, with Clare Mulley as the expert witness.

Michael Morpurgo's 2018 book In the Mouth of the Wolf centres on Skarbek's World War II Resistance work with Morpurgo's uncle, Francis Cammaerts.

On 16 March 2021 author Dana Schwartz released a podcast episode about the life of Krystyna Skarbek, "From Poland With Love".

Mike Palmer's short story "Crissie - A Last Hurrah" was published by Palmridge Publishing in 2022 (ISBN 978-0953462131).

In 1999, Polish writer Maria Nurowska published a novel, Miłośnica (The Lover) – an account of a fictional female journalist's attempt to probe Skarbek's story.

Author William F. Nolan claimed that Ian Fleming, in his first James Bond novel, Casino Royale (1953), modelled Vesper Lynd on Christine Granville. According to Nolan, Fleming also based Tatiana Romanova, in his 1957 novel From Russia, with Love, on Skarbek. Skarbek biographer Clare Mulley, however, wrote that, "if Christine was immortalised as the carelessly beautiful double agent Vesper Lynd, Fleming is more likely to have been inspired by the stories he heard than the woman in person.... [H]e never claimed to have met her, even in passing."

== Film ==
Skarbek is portrayed by Morgane Polanski in the 2024 film The Partisan. In Polish the film is titled Skarbek and is a fictionalized version of Skarbek's work during World War II.

== See also ==
- Kazimierz Leski (an intelligence officer with the "Musketeers" and the Home Army)

== Bibliography ==
- Binney, Marcus (2002). The Women Who Lived for Danger: The Women Agents of SOE in the Second World War. London: Hodder and Stoughton. ISBN 0340818409.. (A fifth of the book is devoted to Krystyna Skarbek; includes a few more recently available documents, but largely draws on Madeleine Masson's work.)
- Fielding, Xan (1954). Hide and Seek: The Story of a War-Time Agent. London: Secker & Warburg. ISBN 978-1589880849. (Dedicated to Krystyna Skarbek; includes the Digne incident.)
- Kasparek, Christopher (2004). "Krystyna Skarbek: Re-viewing Britain's Legendary Polish Agent". The Polish Review. XLIX (3): 945–953.
- Christopher Kasparek, letter to the editor (corrigenda to Kasparek's article in vol. XLIX, no. 3, 2004, and response to Ronald Nowicki's letter in vol. L, no. 1, 2005), The Polish Review, vol. L, no. 2, 2005, pp. 253–255.
- Jan Larecki, Krystyna Skarbek: agentka o wielu twarzach (Krystyna Skarbek: Agent with Many Faces), Warsaw, Książka i Wiedza, 2008, ISBN 978-83-05-13533-7.
- Masson, Madeleine (1975). Christine: A Search for Christine Granville, G.M., O.B.E., Croix de Guerre. London: Hamish Hamilton. ISBN 978-0241892749. (Republished by Virago, 2005.)
- Mulley, Clare (2012). The Spy Who Loved: The Secrets and Lives of Christine Granville, Britain's first female special agent of the Second World War. Macmillan. ISBN 978-1-4472-2565-2.
- Ronald Nowicki, "Krystyna Skarbek: a Letter", The Polish Review, vol. L, no. 1 (2005), pp. 93–101.
- Olson, Lynne (2017). Last Hope Island. New York: Random House. ISBN 978-0812997361.
