= Clare Mulley =

English biographer

- Mulley in 2024
- Born: July 1969 (age 57); Luton, England
- Education: University of Sheffield; University of London
- Years active: 2009–present
- Spouse: Ian Wolter
- Children: 3

Clare Margaret Mulley (born July 1969) is an English biographer of notable women. Her subjects have included Eglantyne Jebb; Krystyna Skarbek, aka Christine Granville; Hanna Reitsch and Melitta von Stauffenberg; and Elżbieta Zawacka.

Her work focuses on women's experiences during the Second World War. She is a recipient of the Bene Merito.

== Early life and education ==
Clare Mulley was born in 1969 in Luton, England, to Gill and Derek Mulley, "who watched the sky turn red over London during the Blitz, and have reached out for better international relations ever since."

Mulley studied history and politics at the University of Sheffield. In 2006, she received a master's degree in social and cultural history, with distinction, from the University of London. Her dissertation was on Affection or Affectation: The Role and Rhetoric of Maternalism in the Development of Women's Social Action in Victorian Britain.

== Career ==
Before writing books, Mulley worked with Save the Children and Sightsavers International. She has also served on the advisory board of the World Development Movement, a British NGO which campaigns on matters of global justice and development in countries of the Globasl South; and as a trustee of the national charity, Standing Together against Domestic Violence.

She is a regular contributor to TV history series and news programmes for the BBC, Channel 5, Channel 4, ITV, the History Channel and the Smithsonian Channel; and has contributed to Newsnight, The One Show, Songs of Praise, and radio programmes including Today, Woman's Hour, Great Lives, and PM, as well as many podcasts.

As a public speaker and literary chair, she has given a TEDx at Stormont and spoken at the House of Lords, Imperial War Museum, National Army Museum, Special Forces Club, British Library, Warsaw Uprising Museum and the national Second World War museums of Poland and the USA. She served as an honorary patron of the Wimpole History Festival and previously lectured on the women of the Special Operations Executive for the Andante group travel company Historical Trips.

Mulley writes and reviews nonfiction for The Spectator, BBC History magazine, The Telegraph, among other periodicals. She served as chair of the judges for the Historical Writers Association Non-Fiction Crown, in 2017 and 2021, and judged the Biographers Club prize in 2024.

Mulley is a member of the Historical Writers Association, Women's History Network, Royal Society of Literature, Biographers Club, Society of Authors, English PEN, Fawcett Society, Writers Against Racism, and the National Secular Society.

== Personal life ==
Clare Mulley lives in north Essex with her husband, the artist Ian Wolter, their three daughters, and a lurcher dog.

== Works ==
=== The Woman Who Saved the Children ===
While working for Save the Children, Clare Mulley was introduced to the life of Victorian-era British social reformer Eglantyne Jebb. Mulley's biography, The Woman Who Saved the Children: A Biography of Eglantyne Jebb, published by Oneworld in 2009 to coincide with the 90th anniversary of Save the Children and with the 20th anniversary of the UN Convention on the Rights of the Child – and republished in 2019 to mark the centenary of Save the Children – won the Daily Mail Biographer's Club Prize.

In 1919 Eglantyne Jebb was arrested in London's Trafalgar Square for distributing humanitarian leaflets, and few in England were sympathetic to a woman hoping to help the children of Britain's World War I enemies. Nevertheless, within weeks Jebb secured the first donation to her "Save the Children" fund, from the public prosecutor at her trial. Five years later she drafted the pioneering statement of children's human rights that has since evolved into the UN Convention on the Rights of the Child, the most universally accepted human-rights instrument in history. Yet she was never particularly fond of individual children, "the little wretches" as she once called them.

When the book was published in 2009, then-UK Prime Minister Gordon Brown called it a "truly brilliant book". Reportedly he had read it while on holiday and was moved to offer the unsolicited review.

The book has been translated into Korean and Spanish.

=== The Spy Who Loved ===
In 2012 Macmillan published Mulley's biography, The Spy Who Loved: the Secrets and Lives of Christine Granville, Britain's First Female Special Agent of World War II.

Winston Churchill is reputed to have called her his favourite spy. Part-Jewish, Polish-born Countess Krystyna Skarbek, aka Christine Granville, was Britain's first and longest-serving female special agent of the Second World War. Arrested by the enemy, Skarbek used guile to save not only her own life, but the lives of male colleagues. It was especially her service behind enemy lines in Nazi-occupied France that made her legendary. She made the first contact between the French resistance and the Italian partisans on opposite sides of the Alps in preparation for Allied invasion in the south, and secured the defection of a German garrison on a strategic pass in the mountains. She was awarded the OBE, the George Medal, and the French Croix de Guerre. Her tragic early death made the papers around the world, yet much of her story was kept hidden.

The book received excellent reviews in the British, American, Canadian, and Polish press.

The Spy Who Loved has been published in Britain, the U.S., Poland, Hungary, Russia, China and Italy.

In 2013 Mulley was awarded the Bene Merito honorary distinction by Poland's foreign minister, Radosław Sikorski.

In September 2020, after a six-year campaign, Mulley unveiled an English Heritage blue plaque commemorating Krystyna Skarbek at her last London address, 1 Lexham Gardens Hotel, South Kensington, London.

=== The Women Who Flew for Hitler ===
Mulley's The Women Who Flew for Hitler was published by Macmillan in the UK, and St Martin's Press in the US, in 2017, and subsequently in Poland, Finland, the Czech Republic, and China. The book was long-listed for the Historical Writers Association Non-fiction Crown.

Hanna Reitsch and Melitta von Stauffenberg defied gender expectations to become leading test pilots for the Third Reich during the Second World War. Both became Honorary Flight Captains, and both were awarded the Iron Cross for their service. Yet although both were motivated by deeply held convictions about honour and patriotism, their contrasting views on the Nazi regime meant they ended their lives on opposites sides of history.

"Vividly drawn... this is a thrilling story", wrote Anne Sebba in The Telegraph, while The Times called the book "popular history of a high order", and The Spectator thought it "well researched and beautifully written". A critic for The Literary Review judged it "Superb and beautifully written, well paced and full of drama".

=== Agent Zo ===
Agent Zo: The Untold Story of a World War II Resistance Fighter was published in 2024. The UK publisher was Weidenfeld & Nicolson; the US publisher was Pegasus Books.

Elżbieta Zawacka, whose code name was "Zo", was enlisted into the elite Silent Unseen of the Polish Armed Forces in the West, the only woman ever to be. During the war she was a courier bringing messages across the border from German-occupied Poland to the Polish Government-in-Exile. She went on to serve in the Warsaw Uprising and beyond.

Agent Zo was shortlisted for the 2025 Women's Prize for Non-Fiction. and was awarded Silver in the Military History Matters Magazine's best books of 2025.

== Bibliography ==
- Clare Mulley, The Woman Who Saved the Children: A Biography of Eglantyne Jebb (Oneworld Publications, 2009) ISBN 978-1-85168-657-5.
- Clare Mulley, contribution to: Carole Angier and Sally Cline, eds., The Arvon Book of Life Writing: Writing Biography, Autobiography and Memoir (Methuen Drama, 2010) ISBN 978-1-4081-2418-5.
- Clare Mulley, The Spy Who Loved: the Secrets and Lives of Christine Granville, Britain's First Female Special Agent of World War II (Macmillan, 2012) ISBN 978-1-4472-2565-2.
- Clare Mulley, 'Introduction', Xan Fielding, Hide and Seek: Story of a Wartime Agent (Folio, 2014)
- Clare Mulley, 'Remembering the contribution of the Jewish Female Special Agents of the Second World War' in Jewish Lives, Public Service (Jewish Museum, London, 2017)
- Clare Mulley, The Women Who Flew for Hitler: The True Story of Hitler's Valkyries (Macmillan, 2018) ISBN 978-1447274209
- Clare Mulley, 'Introduction', Bradl (Warsaw Uprising Museum, 2019)
- Clare Mulley, 'Introduction', Forgotten Force, Polish Women in the Second World War (The Piłsidski Institute, London, 2020)
- Clare Mulley, 'Historical Context', Lili Stern-Pohlmann (Holland House, 2020)
- Clare Mulley, 'Introduction', Christabel Bielenberg, The Past is Myself (Penguin, 2024)
- Clare Mulley, Agent Zo: The Untold Story of Fearless [World War II] Resistance Fighter Elżbieta Zawacka, Weidenfeld & Nicolson, 2024, ISBN 978 1 3996 0106 1, 393 pp.
- Clare Mulley, The Library Book: A History of the Gibson Library and Its Collection (Gibson Library Society, 2025)

== See also ==
- List of feminist literature
- List of women writers
- List of women writers (A–L)
- List of women writers (M–Z)
