= Andrzej Kowerski =

Polish Army officer (1912–1988)

- Born: Andrzej Kowerski; 18 May 1912; Łabunie, Zamość County, Lublin Province, Poland
- Died: 8 December 1988 (aged 76); Munich
- Other name: Andrew Kennedy
- Occupation: Special Operations Executive (SOE) agent

Andrzej Kowerski (pronounced [ˈandʐɛj kɔˈvɛrskʲi]; 18 May 1912 – 8 December 1988) was a Polish Army officer and SOE agent during World War II. From 1941 he used the nom de guerre Andrew Kennedy.

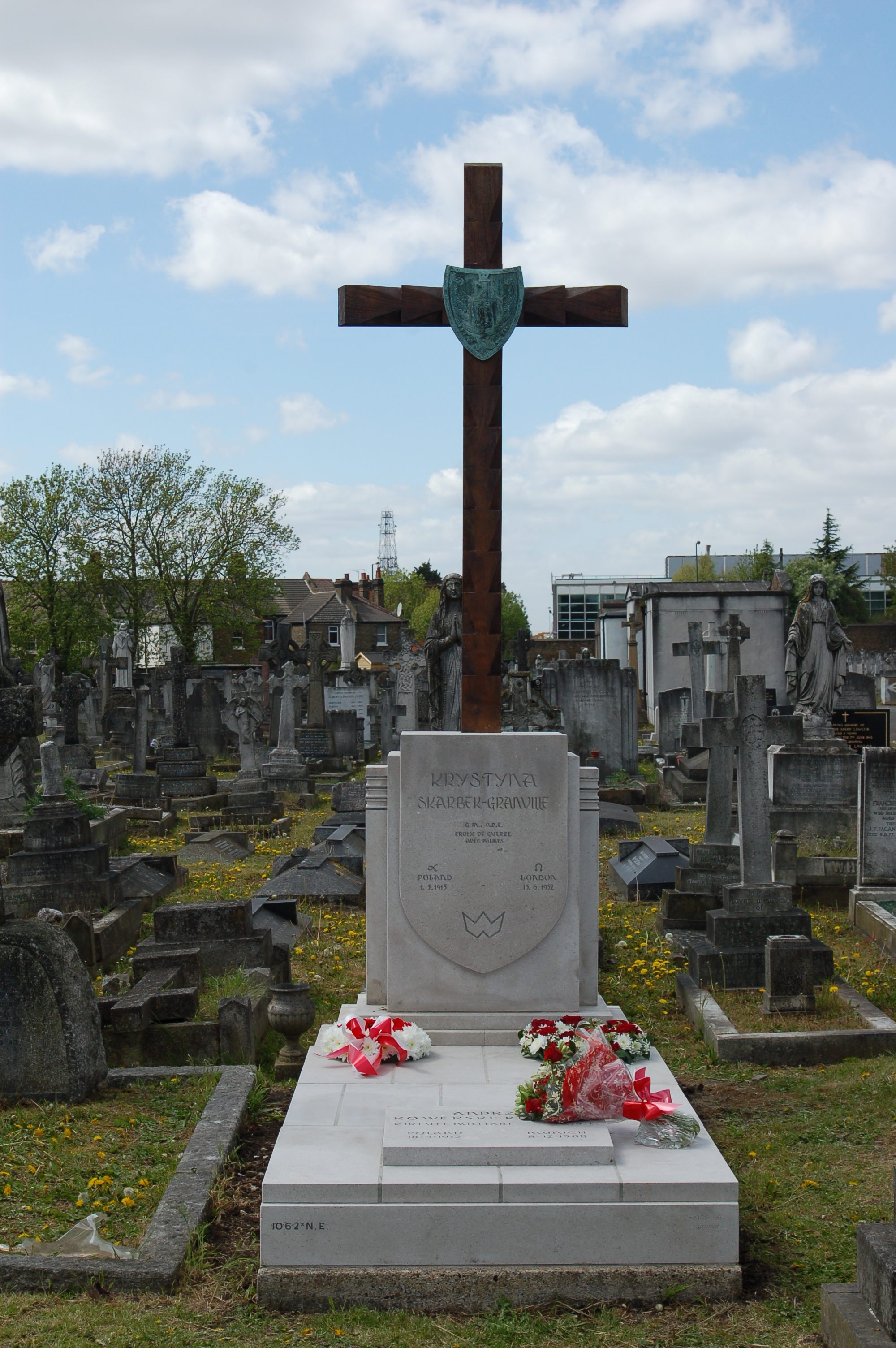
Krystyna Skarbek's grave in St Mary's Catholic Cemetery, Kensal Green, London, with Andrzej Kowerski her partner in life and service in SOE

== Life ==
Before the war Kowerski lost a part of one leg in a hunting accident.

During the German invasion of Poland in September 1939, Lieutenant Kowerski fought as a member of Poland's 10th Motorized Cavalry Brigade, commanded by Col. Stanisław Maczek, winning his country's highest military decoration, the Virtuti Militari.

When Soviet forces invaded eastern Poland on September 17, forcing Poland's government to evacuate south into Romania, Kowerski and his "Black Brigade" (so called after their black leather jackets) evacuated to neighboring Hungary. There he was involved in covert activities, exfiltrating interned Polish, and other Allied, military personnel out of Hungary.

When Kowerski subsequently worked for British Intelligence and the Special Operations Executive, he was given the cover name "Andrew Kennedy." Having lost part of a leg, he became the first disabled man to complete SOE's parachute training. (His lover, Krystyna Skarbek, a.k.a. Christine Granville, was the longest serving female agent of SOE and one of its most prominent. They had first met as children at her family's stables when his father had brought him over to play with ten-year-old Krystyna while he and her father discussed agricultural matters.)

=== Disappearance of Reichsbank and Abwehr reserves ===
Between 1952 and 1954, Kowerski joined up with his friend W. Stanley Moss to investigate a mystery of the final days of the Third Reich. In April and May 1945, the remaining reserves of the Reichsbank – gold (730 bars), cash (6 large sacks), and precious stones and metals such as platinum (25 sealed boxes) – were dispatched by Walther Funk to be buried on the Klausenhof Mountain at Einsiedl in Bavaria, where the final German resistance was to be concentrated. Similarly the Abwehr cash reserves were hidden nearby in Garmisch-Partenkirchen. Shortly after the American forces overran the area, the reserves and money disappeared. Moss and Kennedy travelled back and forth across Germany and into Switzerland and corresponded with fugitives in Argentina, to research what had happened. The disappearance of Major Martin Borg, the US Military Governor of Garmisch-Partenkirchen at the time, has not been explained.

Later, Moss and Kennedy went on to uncover the consequences of Heinrich Himmler’s order of 28 October 1939, which confirmed the Lebensborn programme. They researched what had become of the children born as a result of the order.

== Death and burial ==
Kowerski died from cancer in Munich, Germany, in December 1988. His ashes were flown to London and interred at the foot of Skarbek's grave in St Mary's Catholic Cemetery, Kensal Green, northwest London.

== See also ==
- Krystyna Skarbek
- W. Stanley Moss, with whom Kowerski investigated the disappearance of Nazi gold at the end of World War II.
