= Maciej Matthew Szymanski =

Polish-Canadian Resistance fighter and architect

- Born: 26 February 1926; Warsaw, Poland
- Died: 5 May 2015 (aged 89); Vancouver, British Columbia, Canada
- Occupations: Polish Resistance fighter, architect, writer
- Known for: Dawson & Szymanski - Architects: Montreal Expo 67 pavilions, Polish embassy, Ottawa, airport terminal, Abu Dhabi

Maciej Matthew Szymański (26 February 1926 in Warsaw – 5 May 2015 in Vancouver, British Columbia, Canada) was a member of the Polish Underground Army during World War II (nom de guerre 'Kruczkowski'), an officer in the Polish paramilitary organization NSZ, participant in the Warsaw Uprising of 1944 at the age of 18, Canadian architect, draughtsman, and author of self-published memoirs and essays in his retirement.

== Biography ==
He was born the second son of Dr. Karol Szymański and his wife Anna Trajdos. His father was a medical superintendent of a psychiatric hospital in Warta near Warsaw, Poland. Maciej was educated by the Congregation of Marian Fathers before the war, and subsequently attended underground classes in the Nazi occupied capital where he passed his matriculation. His father was murdered by the Soviets in the Katyń massacre of 1940 along with at least 21,768 Polish officers, auxiliary officers, policemen, border guards, prison guards and members of the intelligentsia. In 1941, at the age of 15, Maciej joined the Military Organization Lizard Union (Związek Jaszczurzy) formed by the underground Organizacja Polska (OP). By 1944 Szymanski became member of the National Armed Forces (NSZ) allied to the Home Army (Armia Krajowa), and entered the partisan battalion Chrobry II. His unit, called 'Warszawianka', was based in central Warsaw in the railway workers' union building (Dom Kolejowy), on the corner of Żelazna and Chmielna streets on an escarpment above the main railway line into the city. The location was of strategic significance, and helped his company hold out till the final capitulation of the Warsaw Uprising. One of his unit comrades was the decorated hero and tragic figure of captain Witold Pilecki who fought as a plain insurgent. He was able to leave the bombed-out capital with the civilian population.

=== Postwar Poland ===
After World War II Szymanski enrolled at the Kraków Polytechnic to study architecture. He continued to be in the anti-communist NSZ. Because members of the underground were being hunted and persecuted by the Soviet installed government's security services, Szymanski moved back to Warsaw, where his family members had survived. There, in 1949, he completed his studies at the Warsaw University of Technology. A so-called 'Amnesty' for partisans, tricked him into revealing his identity, and upon hearing that some of his erstwhile colleagues and friends had been arrested, tortured and murdered by the authorities, he decided to escape from Poland. Along with his new wife, Hanna Kamler, he and two other friends boarded a fishing boat near Westerplatte and sailed to Sweden. They stayed there for two years, but when the opportunity arose, they moved on to Canada in 1951. They reached Montreal where he was able to practice as an architect for many years, having become in 1969 a partner of an international practice, Dawson and Szymanski – Architects. Thanks to the firm's designs for the Montreal Expo 67 pavilions, their work expanded greatly. Among their projects were the Royal Bank of Canada in Quebec City, the Polish embassy in Ottawa, the Polish consulate in Montreal, as well as many commercial and social buildings in 9 provinces of Canada. Projects abroad included the airport terminal building in Abu Dhabi, social housing in Algeria and designs in the Caribbean.

=== Retirement ===
In 1996 when he retired from professional practice, he and his wife were considering a return to Poland, the Eastern Bloc having long dissolved. They decided, however, to move nearer to one of their two daughters in Vancouver. In retirement he was able to concentrate on veterans' matters and discover a considerable writing skill. With his grandchildren in mind, he wrote up his memoirs in two volumes. Thanks to the gift of a computer from his daughters, he became an early adopter and silver surfer on the Internet. There he published recollections and polemics about modern Polish society, which was a disappointment to him having turned during the Soviet era into a much more homogeneous and, in his eyes, impoverished nation: he railed in his writings about Homo Sovieticus. Maciej Szymański died after a short illness on 5 May 2015. He left his body to science. His essays, some in English, will soon be available on Amazon.

== Awards and Distinctions ==
- Military Cross for National Armed Combat - Krzyż Narodowego Czynu Zbrojnego (1944)
- Military Cross of the Home Army - Krzyż Armii Krajowej (1990)
- Warsaw Cross of the Uprising - Warszawski Krzyż Powstańczy (1989)
- By order of the Polish Minister of Defence on 23 July 2000, he was promoted to the rank of captain in the Polish Army
- Member of the Royal Architectural Institute of Canada
- Membre de l'Ordre des Architectes du Québec

== Writings ==
These include:

- Personnel Roll of Platoon 4 - "4 Pluton - Stan Osobowy (Losy uczestników Kompanii "Warszawianki")"
- My ABC - "Moje Abecadło"
- Families ripped apart by History - "Rodziny rozdzielone przez historię"
- Scars of the Uprising - "Powstańcze Blizny"
- The lawyer and newspaper editor, Mieczyslaw Trajdos and his sister, Alexandra (his maternal uncle and aunt) - "Mieczysław Trajdos i jego Siostra Aleksandra", an account of an especially brutal end at the hands of the Nazis.
- A letter of resignation to the NSZ - "List do Związku NSZ"
- Interview with Maciej Szymański in Polish - Montréal 1996

== See also ==
- Chrobry II
- Cursed soldiers
- National Armed Forces
- Polish resistance movement in World War II
- Expo 67 pavilions
