= Stalag IV-B =

German prisoner of war camp

- Mühlberg, Brandenburg
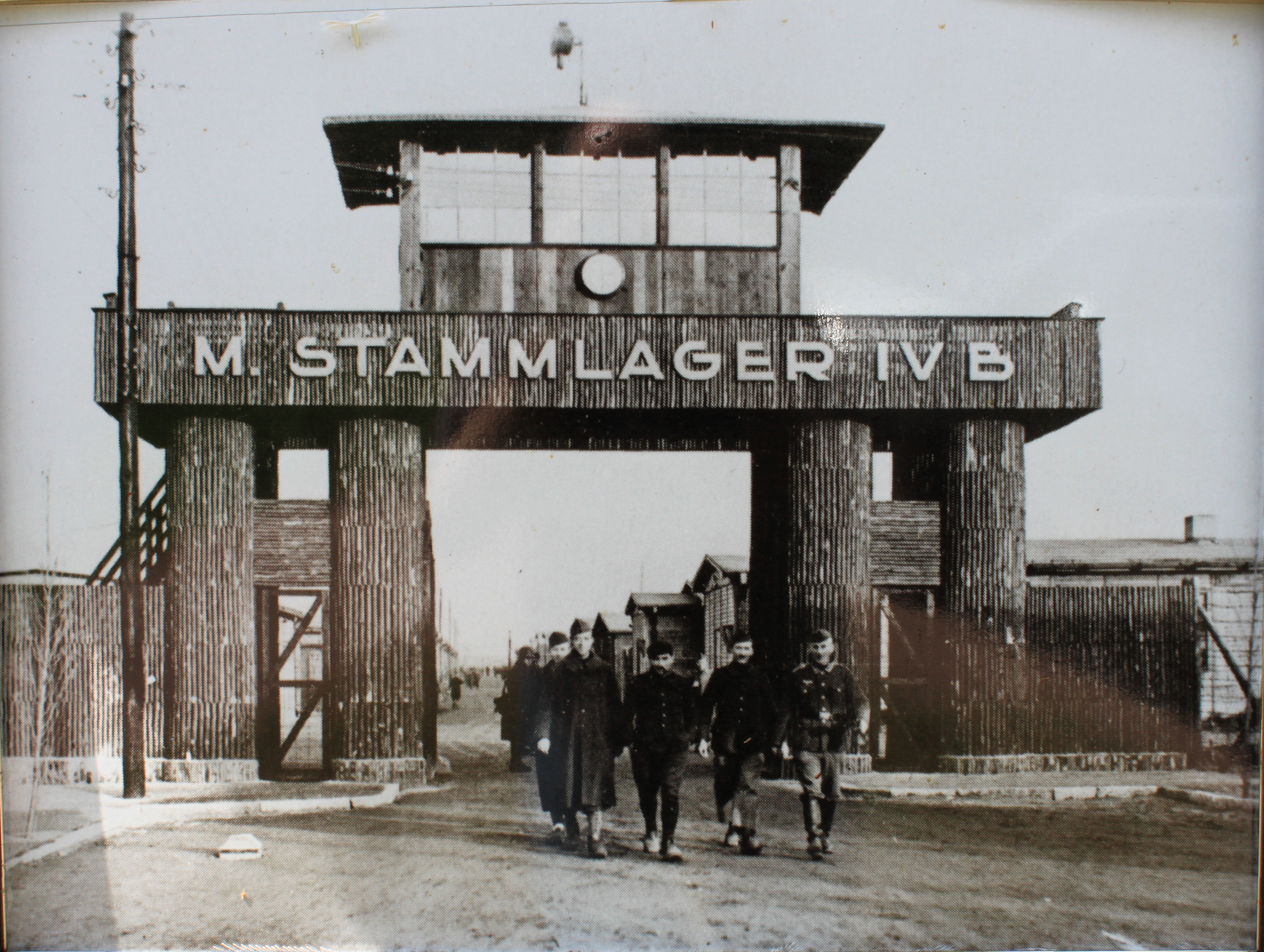
- Entrance to Stalag IV-B

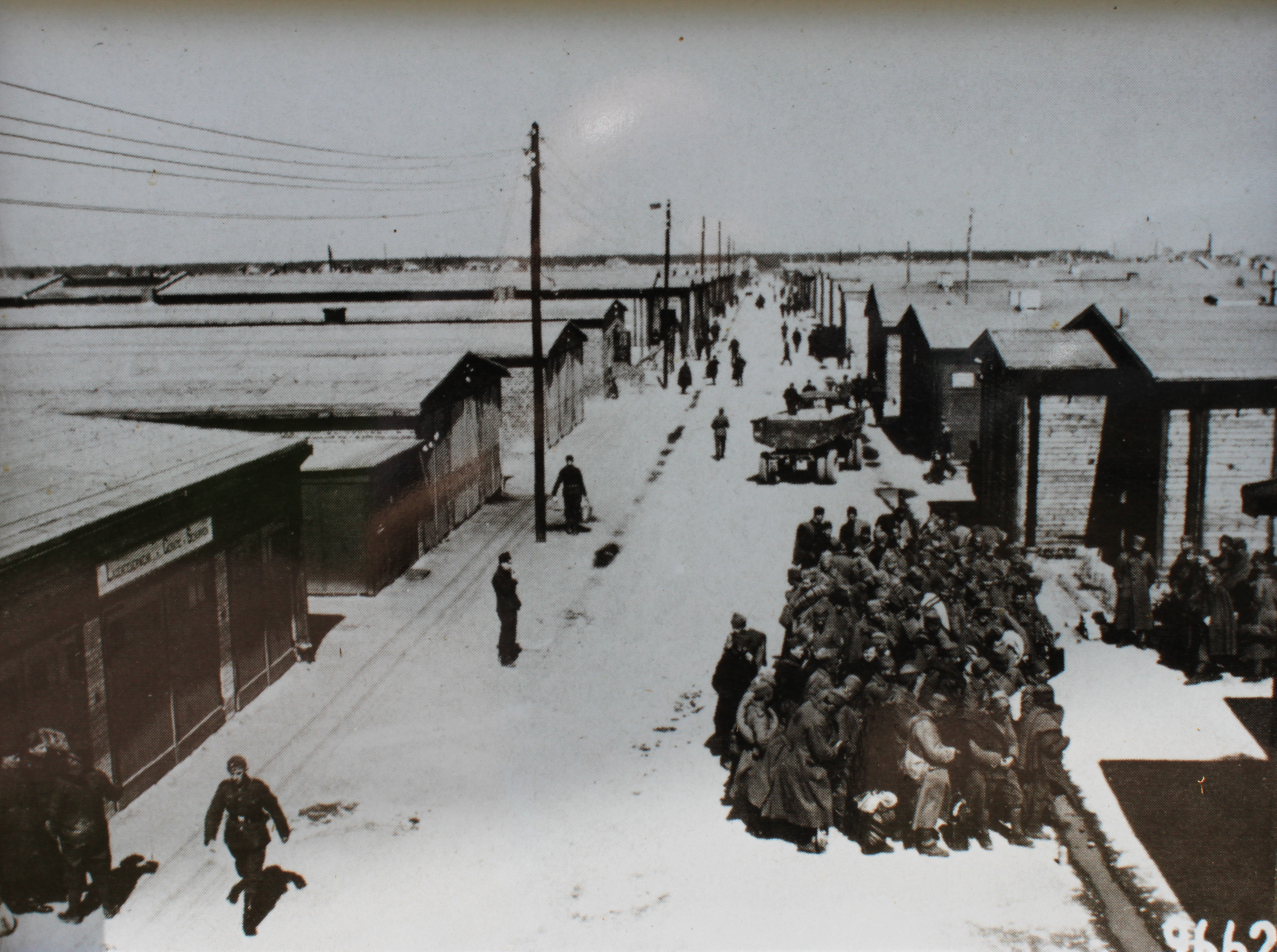
- Main street of the camp

Site information
- Type: Prisoner-of-war camp
- Controlled by: Nazi Germany

Location
- Mühlberg, Germany (pre-war borders, 1937)
- Coordinates: 51.446°N 13.283°E

Site history
- In use: 1939–1945
- Battles/wars: World War II

Garrison information
- Occupants: Polish, French, British, Australian, Soviet, Yugoslav, South African, Italian and other Allied prisoners of war

Stalag IV-B was one of the largest prisoner-of-war camps in Germany during World War II, located 8 km (5.0 mi) north-east of the town of Mühlberg. It held Polish, French, British, Australian, Soviet, Yugoslav, South African, Italian and other Allied prisoners of war.

Stalag is an abbreviation of the German Stammlager ("Main Camp"). The camp was located in the Prussian Province of Saxony, just east of the Elbe river and about 30 mi (48 km) north of Dresden. From 1944 to 1945 it belonged to the Province of Halle-Merseburg. Now, the area is in Brandenburg. A sub-camp, sometimes identified as Stalag IV-B/Z,Stalag 304 or Stalag IV-H was located at Zeithain, 10 km (6.2 mi) to the south in Saxony.

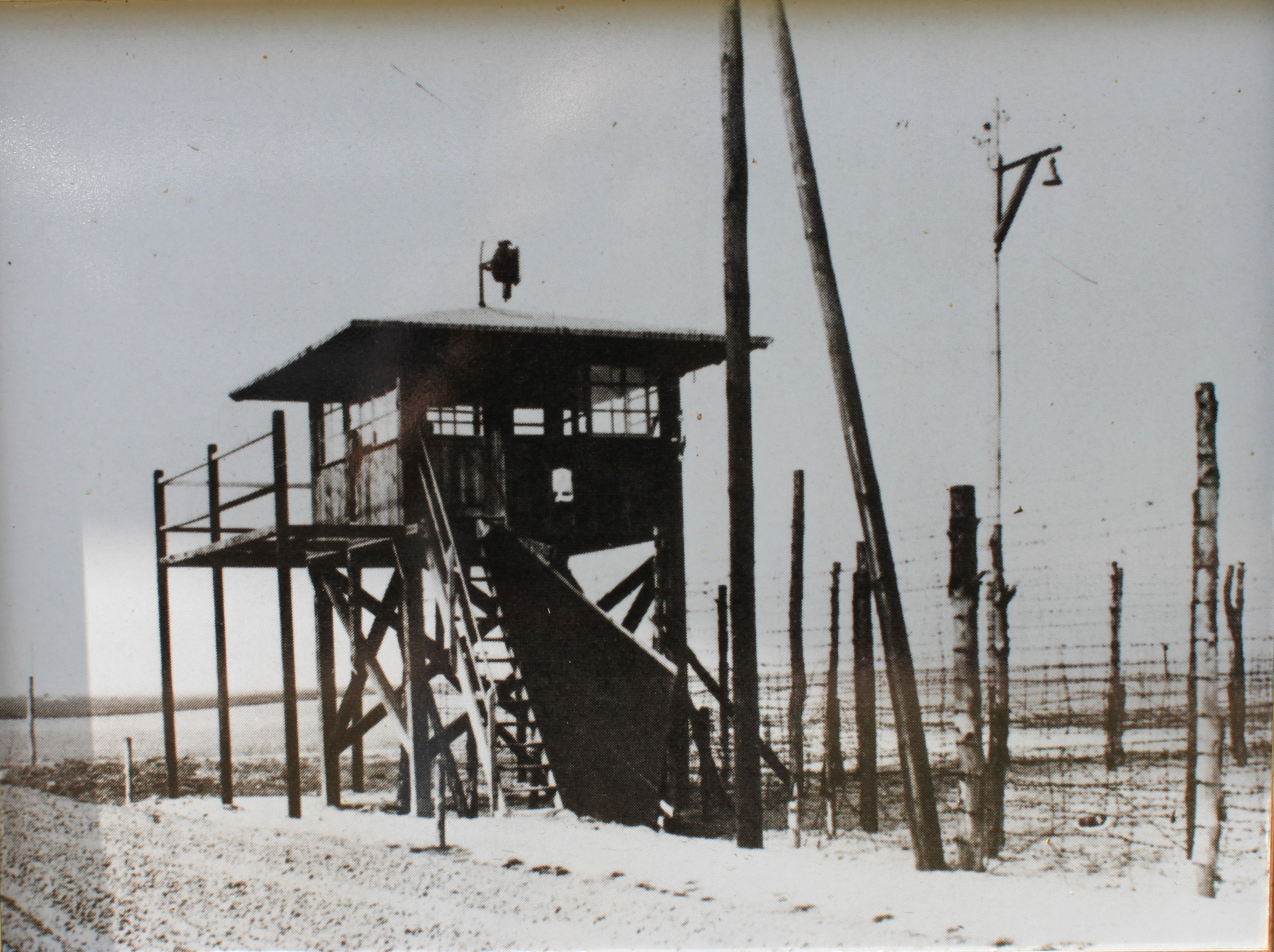
Watchtower of Stalag IV-B

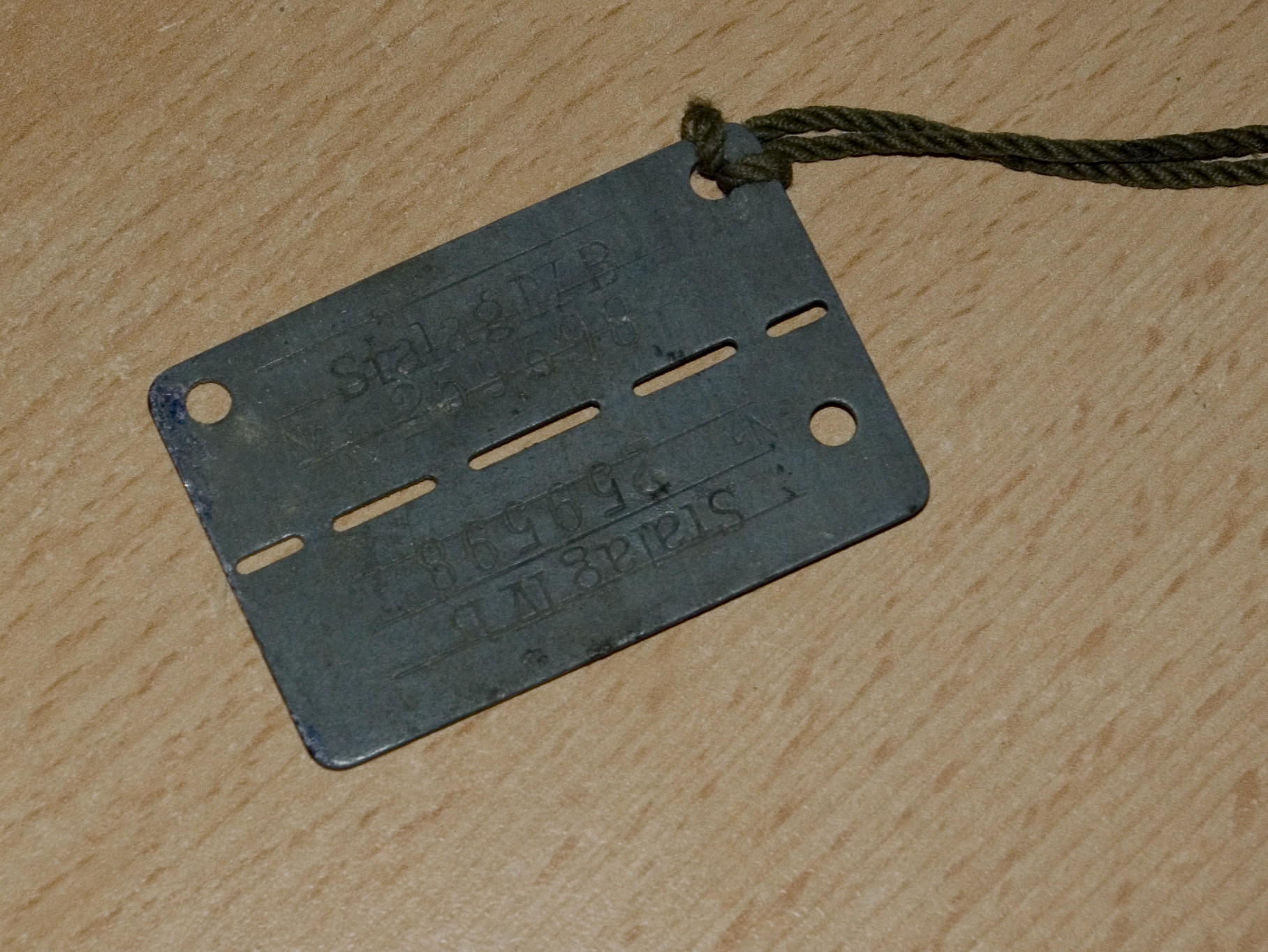
POW dogtag from Stalag IVB

== Stalag IV-B Mühlberg ==
The camp, covering about 30 hectares (74 acres), was opened in September 1939. The first inmates were about 17,000 Polish soldiers captured in the German September 1939 offensive. For the first two months they dwelt under the open sky or in tents. Most of them were transferred further to other camps. In May 1940 the first French soldiers arrived, taken prisoner in the Battle of France. In 1941 British, and Australian soldiers arrived after the fall of Greece, and later in the year Soviet POWs from the invasion of the Soviet Union. In September 1943, further numbers of British, ANZAC, and South African soldiers, previously captive in Italy, arrived after the Italian capitulation. In October 1943, the Germans brought a sizeable number of Italian POWs from the POW camp in Bogusze in German-occupied Poland to Stalag IV-B, who were then often sent to various forced labour subcamps in the region. In October 1944 several thousand Poles arrived, members of the Armia Krajowa ("Home Army") captured after the Warsaw Uprising, including 1,037 women soldiers. In November 1944 the Polish women were transferred to other camps, mainly Stalag IV-E (Altenburg) and Oflag IX-C (Molsdorf). At the end of December 1944 about 7,500 Americans arrived from the Battle of the Bulge. At least 3,000 of them were transferred to other camps, mostly to Stalag VIII-A. On 23 April 1945 the Red Army liberated the camp. Altogether soldiers from 33 nations passed through the camp.

=== Camp publications ===
The British prisoners published two periodicals: the wall newspapers The New Times and a richly illustrated Flywheel.

The Flywheel was founded by Tom Swallow, and comprised pages from school exercise-books that carried hand-written articles with colour illustrations from whatever inks the editorial team could produce from stolen materials, like quinine from the medical room; these were stuck into place with fermented millet soup, kept from the meagre camp rations. One copy per issue was produced, to be circulated among members throughout the camp. When extracts were published in hardback format in 1987, the book ran to two reprints.

An additional periodical, The Observer was published between December 1943 and May 1944.

The camp's Welsh soldiers also created their own periodical called Cymro ("Welshman"), edited by prisoner William John Pitt. The magazines were produced between July 1943 and December 1944. Eight issues of the magazines were created, and out of these one was lost in the camp. Although most of the issues are in English, two pages are in Welsh. The manuscript was bought by The National Library of Wales at Sotheby's in 1987.

From March 1944 to December 1944 the Scottish prisoners were served with their own papers, The Scotsman and The Scotsman Special Sports Supplement, edited, printed and illustrated in both colour and black and white by RAF pilot Warrant Officer Matthew MacSwan Robertson. The articles were written by the editor and other prisoners and concentrated primarily on Scottish matters, camp social life and the various sports events held in the camp. The Scotsman had seven issues and the Sports had twelve issues. Only one copy of each issue was produced and the papers were taken from hut to hut between publications for all to read.

=== Soviet control ===
When the Soviet Army arrived at the camp in April 1945, there were about 30,000 crowded into the facilities, of these 7,250 were British. About 3,000 died, mainly from tuberculosis and typhus. They were buried in the cemetery in neighbouring Neuburxdorf, Bad Liebenwerda. Today a memorial and a museum commemorate them.

The Soviet liberators held the British and American prisoners in the camp for over a month. Individual soldiers "escaped" from the camp and made their way on foot to the American lines.

In August 1945 the Soviet secret police NKVD opened on the area of Stalag IV-B one of its special camps No. 1 using the shacks of Stalag IV-B. More than 22,800 persons were imprisoned and over 6,700 of them died until operation of the camp was ceased in 1948.

== Stalag IV-B Zeithain ==
The sub-camp, originally Stalag 304 (Stalag IV-H), was built in April 1941 next to the military depot, training ground, and Jacobsthal railway station, to accommodate Soviet prisoners. In 1942 it became Stalag IV-B Zeithain, a sub-camp of Stalag IV-B Mühlberg.

By July 1941 about 11,000 Soviet soldiers, and some officers, had arrived, but by April 1942 only 3,279 remained. The rest had died from malnutrition and a typhus epidemic caused by the deplorable sanitary conditions. The bodies were buried in mass graves. After April 1942 more Soviet prisoners arrived and died just as rapidly. At the end of 1942 10,000 reasonably healthy Soviet prisoners were transferred to Belgium to work in the coal mines. In February 1943 Zeithain was transformed into a hospital camp designated Stalag IV-B/H. The main part still housed Soviet prisoners suffering from tuberculosis, who continued to die at the rate 10–20 per day (according to German sources). The section closest to the railway station was now used to house sick prisoners of other nationalities. These included several hundred Poles and Yugoslavs brought from other camps. In September 1943 a section was set aside for sick Italian soldiers imprisoned after Marshal Badoglio surrendered to the Allies. About 900 died but, in contrast to the Soviet prisoners, they were buried in individual graves in a military cemetery in Jacobsthal. In October 1944, around 25 huts of the Italian section were separated into a special enclosure to house about 1,100 wounded survivors, men and women, of the Polish Armia Krajowa ("Home Army") that had fought in the Warsaw Uprising for 63 days; as well as the medical personnel – 55 doctors and 168 nurses – to care for them. A train also brought hospital equipment and supplies salvaged from the ruins of Warsaw and the families of the doctors. The Camp Commandant, Colonel Doctor Stachel observed the families with children, and even pets, descending from the train, and walked away in disgust. German sources quote that "..the nurses and other staff went to work with great dedication, and achieved a standard of hygiene that had never been seen before in Zeithain." This was probably the only POW camp in the world housing both men and women, and in which eleven babies were born and assigned POW registration numbers. The Red Army liberated the camp on 23 April 1945.

== Memorials ==
The memorial to the victims of Stalag IV-B is situated at the POW cemetery in Neuburxdorf near Bad Liebenwerda. The local community has built a memorial to the victims of Stalag IV-B Zeithain in a Memorial Grove (Gedenkstätte Ehrenhain Zeithain) near the station, with a museum. The camp site of Stalag IV-B has also been transformed to a memorial area with glass steles explaining the history of the camp. In 2016, the German government was using the privatisation company BVVG GmbH to find potential buyers for the mining rights at the area of former Stalag IV-B in order to open a gravel mine at the camp site. After fierce resistance, it was decided in February 2017 to split the mining area and to protect the camp memorial.

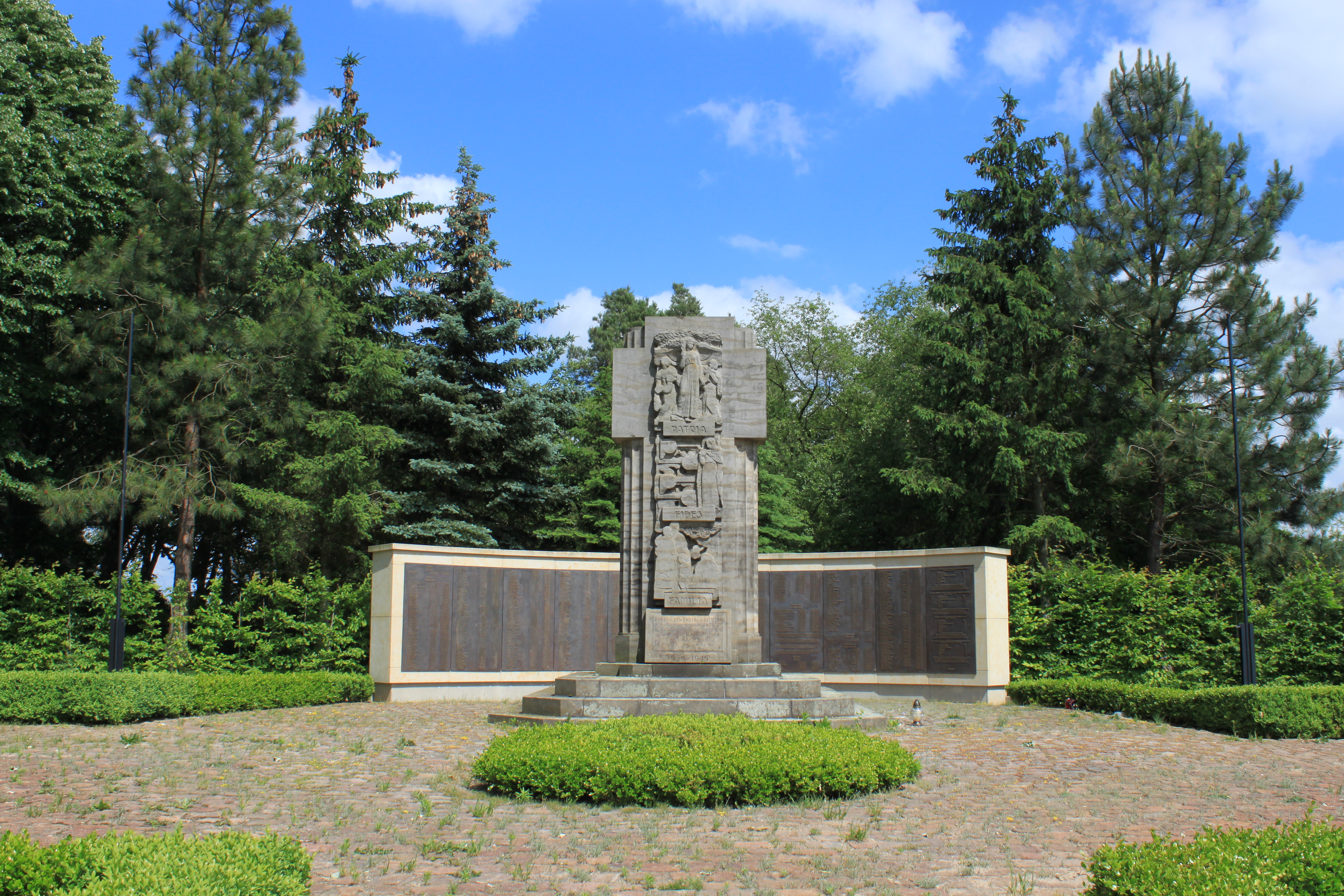
Memorial to victims of Stalag IV-B at the POW cemetery of Neuburxdorf, Bad Liebenwerda

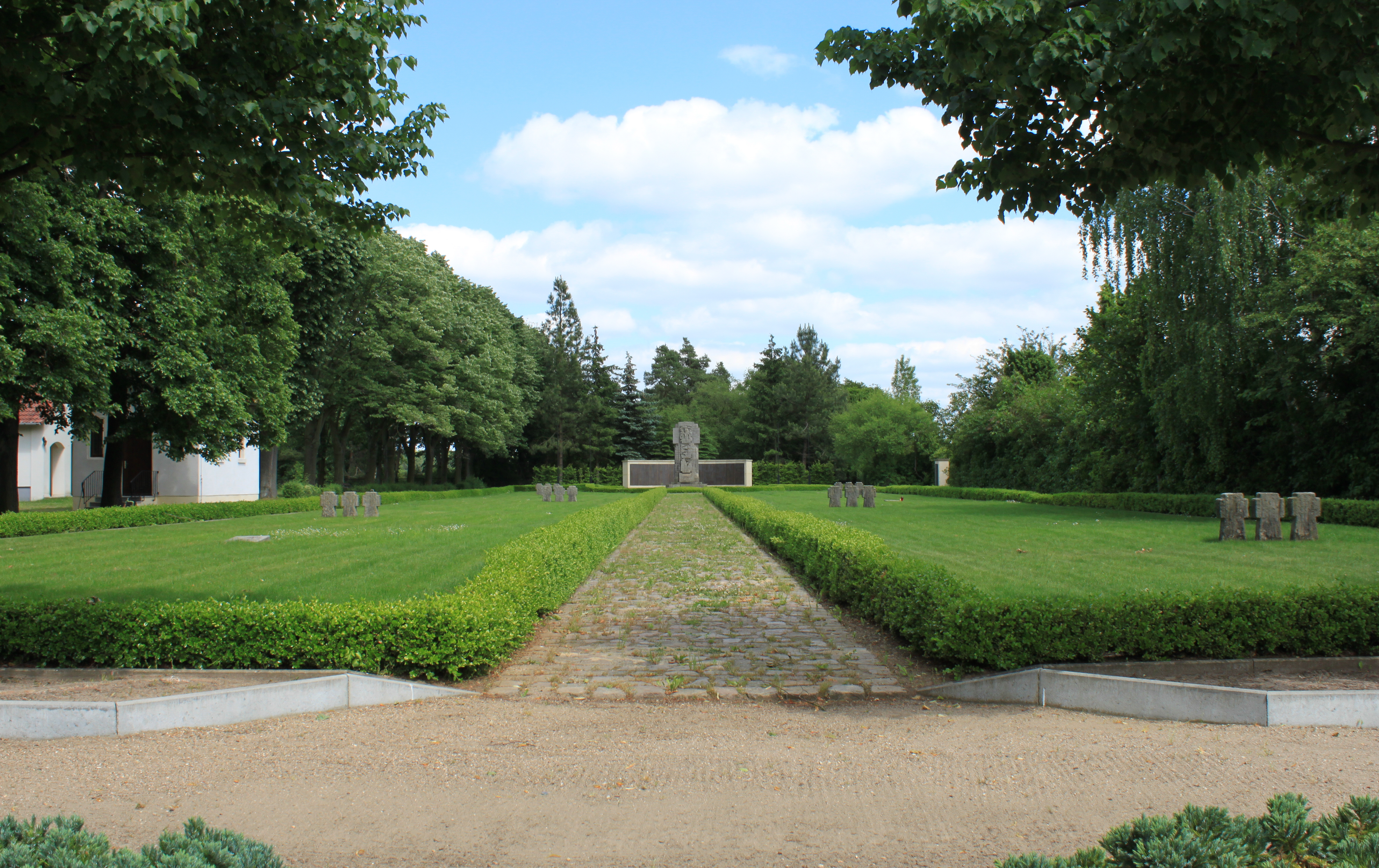
The Neuburxdorf POW cemetery

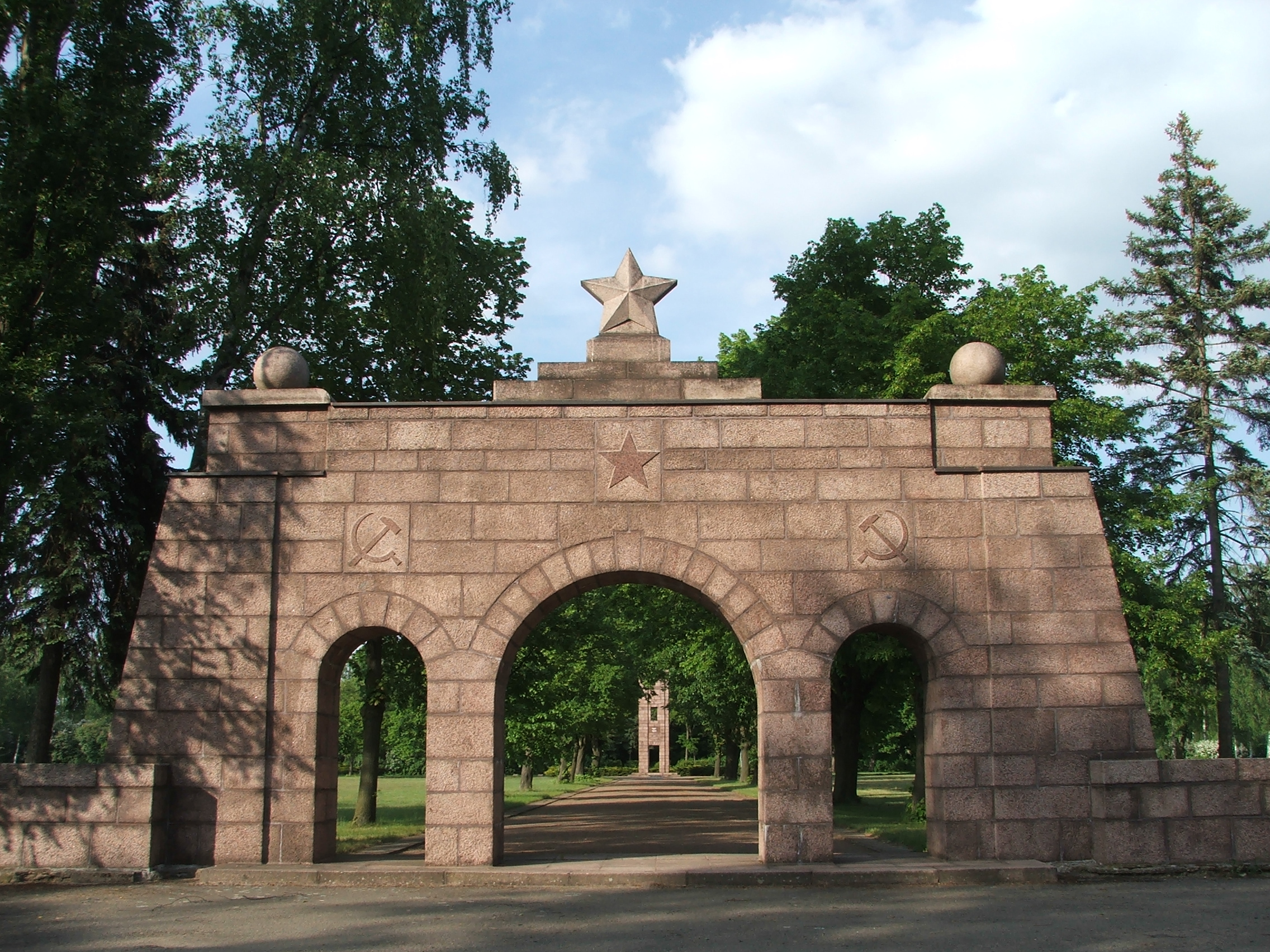
Memorial Ehrenhain Zeithain

== Prominent persons passing Stalag IV B ==
- Bob Entrop, Dutch malacologist
- Claude Simon, 1985 Nobel Laureate in Literature, France
- Konstanty Ildefons Gałczyński, Polish poet
- Kurt Vonnegut, American writer
- Jakub Michlewicz, Polish resistance child soldier

== Literature ==
- Henk E. Pelser, Henk's war. A Memoire of the Dutch Underground. London, Portell Production, 2006 (Medical officer cadet in the Dutch army, POW in Stalag IV-B from 16 March 1944 – 12 June 1945)
- Herbert Krentz: To Hell in a Halifax. (The true story of RCAF pilot Herbert Krentz, who spent more than a year at Stalag IV-B after being shot down over Germany. Krentz invited his fellow POWs to write in his journal, and their stories, in their own words, are reproduced in the book.)
