= Leon Nowakowski =

Polish soldier

Leon Nowakowski, nom de guerre "Lig", (born 1908 near Odessa, died 1944 in Warsaw) was a Polish soldier, a member of the Home Army and the moderate faction of the National Armed Forces which merged with it, with a rank of major, creator and later the commander of the Chrobry II Battalion, participant in the Warsaw Uprising.
