= The Other End of the Tunnel =

De Andere Kant van de Tunnel
- Directed by: Bob Entrop
- Release date: 1994
- Running time: 85 minutes
- Country: Netherlands
- Language: Dutch

The Other End of the Tunnel or De Andere Kant van de Tunnel is a 1994 Dutch film directed by Bob Entrop.

== Cast ==
- Linda van den Bremer
- Hanne Essen van ... Wedding guest
- John Leddy
- Mimoun Oaïssa
- Truus te Selle
- Nikolai van den Hoek
- Johan Zeldenrust ... Wedding guest
