= Chrobry II Battalion =

Polish military unit

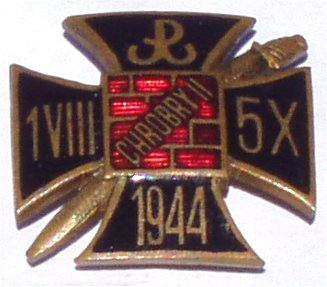
Pin of the Chroby II Battalion

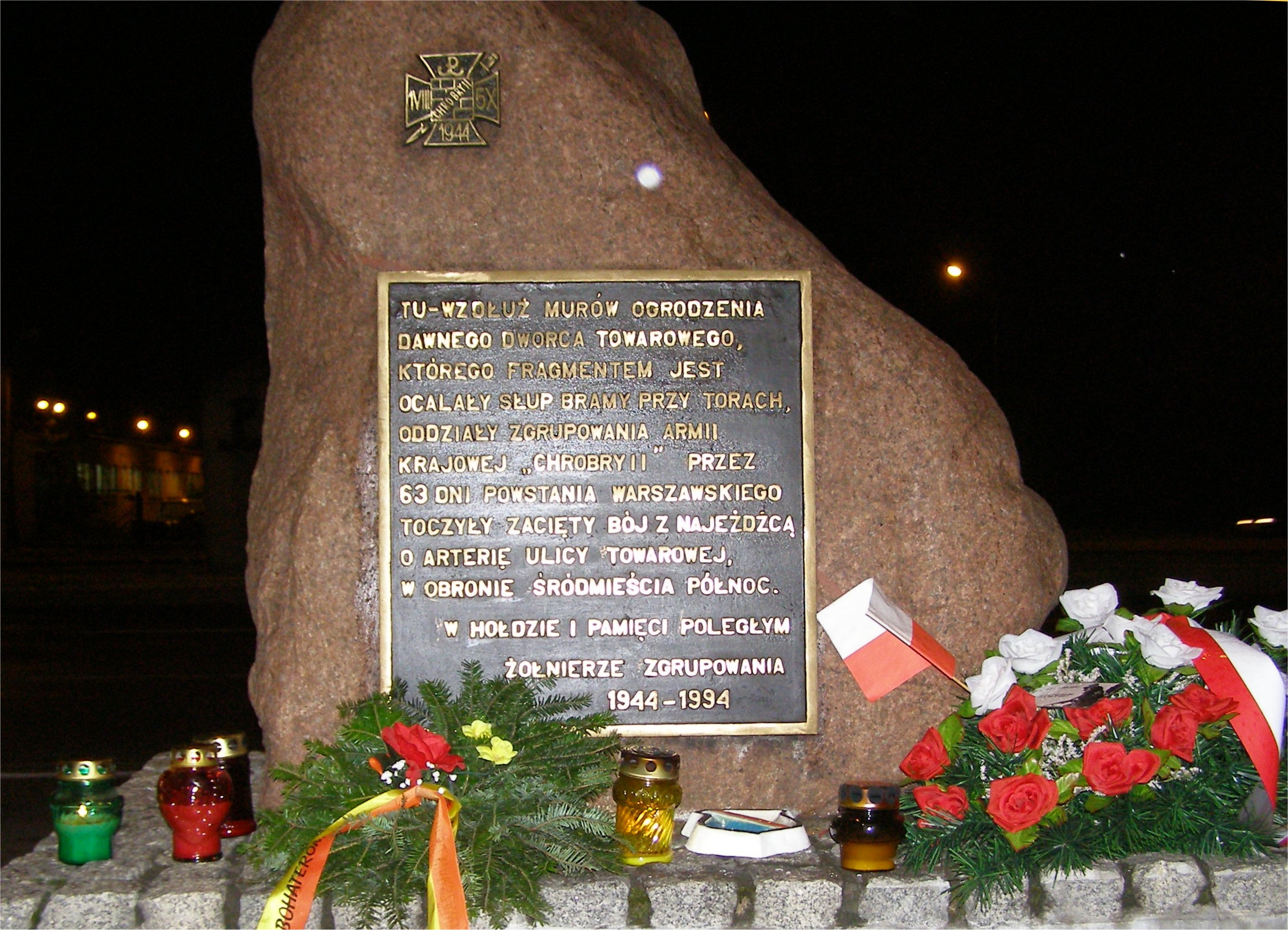
Memorial to the fallen soldiers of the battalion on Towarowa St. in Warsaw

The Chrobry II Battalion was a unit, formally subordinate to the Polish Home Army (AK), which took part in the Warsaw Uprising. It was named after the Polish king Bolesław I Chrobry ("Chrobry" is old Polish for "valiant").

== Formation and name ==
The Chobry II Battalion was formed on August 1, 1944, the day the Warsaw Uprising broke out. It was later expanded to a Battalion group. The battalion's first commander was Major Leon Nowakowski (Lig). Later the Battalion group was led by Major Zygmunt Brejnak. Since it was organised without direct oversight from the Home Army High Command it soon turned out that there already was another battalion of the same name operating in the same area of Warsaw, under the command of Major Gustaw Billewicz (Sosna - Pine). As a result, the unit was redesignated with the Roman numeral "II" and came under the command of the 1st Region's Śródmieście (City centre) officer, Edward Pfeiffer.

Because of the chance nature of the unit's formation, it contained fighters of various underground formations and ideological backgrounds, including those from the Home Army and from the nationalist National Armed Forces (NSZ).

The battalion fought in the city centre and on the 3rd of August its "Warszawianka" company, led by Lieutenant Zbigniew Brym carried out a successful assault on the Railway Post Office, located at the junction of Żelazna St. and Aleje Jerozolimskie. On the 8th of August it captured the building of the Ministry of Water and Sewerage in Starynkiewicz Sq., which it lost four days later having to retreat after a counterattack by the Russian-backed Kaminski Brigade.

== The Prosta Street murders ==
During the uprising, a captain in the battalion, Wacław Zagórski (Leszek) discovered that some insurgents (a group of 8 to 10 men) from a different battalion, under the command of officer Stykowski (Hal), had allegedly murdered a number of Jews who had emerged from hiding. Together with Roman Bornstein, Chrobry battalion's medic (who was Jewish), he reported the crime to the AK High Command and later published an account of it. According to Bornstein, they met with the commander of the uprising, Antoni Chruściel (Monter) who was outraged at the crime and ordered an immediate investigation and court martial of those responsible. The resulting investigation by the Home Army's security services led to the arrest of one person, Robert Kaminski, (Francuz) and an arrest warrant for another, Cpl. Mucha, with the recommendation that they both be executed under martial law. However, Kaminski's fate remains unknown, while Mucha died, killed in the fighting before he could be arrested. Some sources have questioned whether Kaminski was in fact responsible for the murders or whether he served as a patsy for Stykowski.

Further investigations were suspended when it was discovered that the remaining perpetrators had either been killed in fighting or by members of their own unit. In particular, Stykowski's own men shot a Corporal Unrug whom they blamed for the murders, supposedly because they had been disgusted by his actions. However, it is also possible that Unrug was killed in order to keep him from implicating Stykowski (who was never prosecuted) in the crime. Investigations also revealed that Stykowski's men had also killed members of the Chrobry II unit out of robbery motives.

According to accounts after the war, the Chrobry II battalion had been mistakenly blamed for the murders, because they controlled an area neighbouring the one where they had been committed. In fact, it was actually one of the senior officers of the battalion who had exposed the crime.

== Notable soldiers of the unit ==
At its height, the Chrobry II Battalion had 3200 personnel, including 3000 fighters. During the uprising, about 400 of them were killed.

One of the platoons of the battalion was led by the author of the first ever report about the Holocaust, Witold Pilecki, later executed by the Polish communist secret police.

Notable soldiers in the battalion, in addition to those mentioned above, included Captain Piotr Zacharewicz ("Zawadzki") commander of the "Warszawianka Company" located in Dom Kolejowy (The Railworkers' Union Building), Maciej Matthew Szymanski, Tadeusz Siemiątkowski and Mirosław Biernacki

The unit has also been noted for having a high number of Jewish soldiers in its ranks, most of whom had emerged from hiding on the outbreak of the uprising. These included the diarist Calel Perechodnik, who served with the NSZ platoon, and Wiktor Natanson ("Humieński"), aged 14 and Jakub Michlewicz 15 years old, who were among the youngest members of the battalion.
