= Pensioner =

Person receiving a pension

A pensioner is a person who receives a pension, most commonly because of retirement from the workforce. This is a term typically used in the United Kingdom (along with OAP, initialism of old-age pensioner), Ireland and Australia where someone of pensionable age may also be referred to as an "old age pensioner". In the United States, the term retiree is more common, and in New Zealand, the term superannuitant is commonly used. In many countries, increasing life expectancy has led to an expansion of the numbers of pensioners, and they are a growing political force.

== Political parties ==
- 50Plus in the Netherlands
- Dor, the Israeli Pensioners' Party
- National Party of Retirees and Pensioners in Poland
- Party of United Pensioners of Serbia
- Pensioners' Party
- Norwegian Pensioners Party
- Scottish Senior Citizens Unity Party
- Swedish Senior Citizen Interest Party

== Other uses ==
- In the University of Cambridge, a pensioner is a student who is not a scholar or sizar and who pays for their tuition and commons. The term commoner may also be applied, especially at the University of Oxford.
- A political pensioner is a member of a formerly ruling dynasty who is paid a 'pension' (e.g. by the British Raj) as a partial compensation for the income lost by not exercising an ancestral claim to a native throne.
- A Chelsea Pensioner is a retired British soldier who lives within the Royal Hospital.
- In the Thoroughbred breeding industry, a pensioner is a stallion that has been retired from stud duty due to declining fertility (usually related to age).

== See also ==
- AARP (American Association of Retired Persons)
- Age UK
- Elderly care
- ProtectSeniors.Org
- Reminiscence therapy
- Senior citizen
- Silver surfer (internet user)
