= Stanisław Ostwind-Zuzga =

Polish resistance member

Stanisław Ostwind
- Born: 26 April 1899; Warsaw, Poland
- Died: 4 February 1945 (aged 45); Warsaw, People's Republic of Poland
- Military career
- Allegiance: Poland
- Branch: National Armed Forces
- Service years: 1915-1920; 1942-1945
- Rank: Major
- Nicknames: "Zuzga" "Kropidło", "Bolesław"
- Commands: local commandant of NSZ in Węgrów

Stanisław Ostwind-Zuzga (code-names "Kropidło", "Bolesław"; 26 April 1899 – 4 February 1945) was a master sergeant of the Polish Army, major of National Armed Forces (NSZ), local commandant of NSZ in Węgrów, and one of the highest-ranked officers of Jewish background in the Polish anti-Nazi resistance during World War II.

== Life ==
He was born in Warsaw as Szmul Ostwind, son of Wolf (Władysław) Ostwind and Rebeka (Regina) née Saudel. Between 1915 and 1917 he fought in the Polish Legions, in the Polish 1st Legions Infantry Regiment, led by Major Edward Śmigły-Rydz. He participated in the Battle of Kostiuchnówka, among others. After the Oath crisis, he was interned by the Germans in Szczypiorno. In 1919 he graduated from military academy as a master sergeant, after which he was assigned to the 36th Infantry Regiment, and participated in the Polish–Soviet War of 1920. In the interwar period he was baptised into the Catholic Church, and worked for the state police.

After Germany invaded Poland in 1939, he lived under the false name "Zuzga". Since 1942 he was a member of the National Military Organization in Łuków County, later he transferred to the National Armed Forces (NSZ). He finished his training in the NSZ training facility "Dym" (Smoke) in Jata, after which he conducted operations in the Siedlce area. In May 1944 he became a leader of the regional command of the NSZ in Węgrów. He was the top-ranked Polish Jewish officer in the Polish non-communist resistance. On 1 June 1944 he was promoted to the rank of Major. One of his first actions as a leader was an attempt to negotiate joining forces with the Home Army, an attempt which most likely failed. On 3 January 1945, he was arrested by the newly established (after the Soviet occupation of Poland), Communist secret police (Ministry of Public Security). He was later transferred to a prison in Otwock and tortured during questioning. After his Jewish origin was discovered, the Communists attempted to convince him to switch sides, an offer which he refused. He was executed on 4 February 1945.

In 2018, by order of the President of the Republic of Poland Andrzej Duda, Ostwind was posthumously awarded the Commander's Cross of the Order of Polonia Restituta for outstanding services to the independence of the Republic of Poland.
