= Tadeusz Kurcyusz =

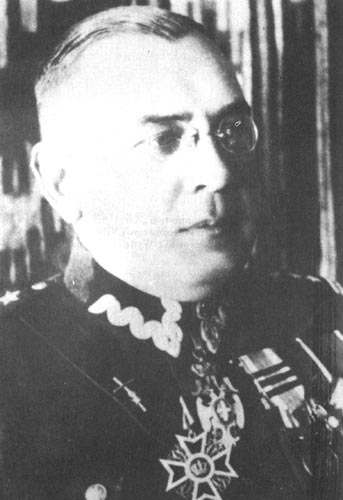
- Born: 15 October 1881; Warsaw, Russian Empire
- Died: 22 April 1944 (aged 62); Warsaw
- Burial place: Powązki Military Cemetery
- Military career
- Branch: Imperial Russian Army, Polish Armed Forces, Secret Polish Army, Confederation of the Nation, Union of Armed Struggle, Home Army, National Armed Forces
- Rank: Colonel
- Units: 1st Polish Corps in Russia, Polish General Staff,
- Conflicts: World War I Polish–Soviet War; World War II
- Awards: Cross of Valour, Cross of Merit, Order of the Crown of Romania, Order of the White Eagle, Order of the White Lion, Legion of Honour, 1914–1918 Inter-Allied Victory medal

Tadeusz Kurcyusz (pseudonyms: Fiszer, gen. Mars, Morski, Żegota) (15 October 1881, Warsaw - 22 or 23 April 1944) was a colonel of the Polish Army. He was in command of the National Armed Forces (NSZ) from August 1, 1943 until his death in April 1944. He was posthumously given the rank of Brigadier General.

== Biography ==
Son of Ludwik, an engineer and landowner, and Michalina née Fiszer, who was the sister of the famous Franc Fiszer, a philosopher, a popular figure among Warsaw writers and artists. He had a brother Jerzy, a lawyer, married to Helena Słomińska.

In 1909 in Liège he obtained an engineering diploma. From 1914 he served in the Russian army. From 1917 he was an officer of the staff of the Polish I Corps in the East, and a civilian clerk in the Military Commission of the Provisional Council of State in 1918. As an officer of the former Polish I Corps, by the rescript of the Regency Council of 25 October 1918 he was assigned to the subordinate Polish Army with the approval of his rank.

In the Polish Army from November 1918. He was successively: head of the adjutant's office of the General Staff, officer of the Organizational and Mobilization Department of the Border Guard, head of the mobilization section in the Cavalry Inspectorate. Chief of staff of this inspectorate from 1919, and then chief of staff of the 1st Rifle Division of the Army of General Haller. In the years 1921-1922 he was a student of a training course at the Higher Military School in Warsaw. During the same period he remained an additional officer of the 30th Field Artillery Regiment in Biała Podlaska. After completing the course and obtaining the academic title of officer of the General Staff, he was assigned to Department IV of the General Staff in Warsaw. On December 9, 1925, he was transferred to the position of head of Department IV of the General Staff. In 1924 he was the General Military Commissioner of Railways - head of the Transport and Railway Service in Department IV of the General Staff of the Polish Army. During his service in this position, he remained a surplus officer of the 2nd Horse Artillery Division.

During the May Coup of 1926, he sided with the legal authorities. On May 16, 1926, he was transferred to the disposal of the Chief of the General Staff. From 1926, commander of the 26th Field Artillery Regiment, and from 1927, commander of the 27th Field Artillery Regiment in Włodzimierz Wołyński. Colonel of the General Staff of the Artillery with seniority from July 1, 1923. Retired in 1931. Member of the Main Board of the Association of Retired Officers and the Association of Hallerczyks.

From mid-1940, in the underground in the Secret Polish Army. Chief of Staff of the Confederated Military Units from December 1940, and from January 1941 Chief of Staff of the Armed Confederation. After the merger of the Confederation with the Union of Armed Struggle in September 1941, he was the Chief of Communications in the Main Command of the Union of Armed Struggle–Home Army. Around August 26, 1942, he was arrested and imprisoned in Pawiak. In December of the same year, he was bought out of prison and transferred to the personnel reserve of the Main Command of the Home Army. After being released from prison, he joined the National Armed Forces without the knowledge of the Home Army.

From August 1, 1943 until his death (April 22 or 23, 1944), he was the commander of the National Armed Forces. He is often mistakenly presented as the plenipotentiary of the Home Army commander for the merger of the National Armed Forces. Posthumously promoted to Brigadier General of the National Armed Forces.

Tadeusz Kurcyusz was married twice. His first wife was Eugenia Thieme, with whom he had a daughter, Irena. After his wife's death, he remarried to Zofia Ziegler.
