= Zbigniew Brym =

Polish home army soldier

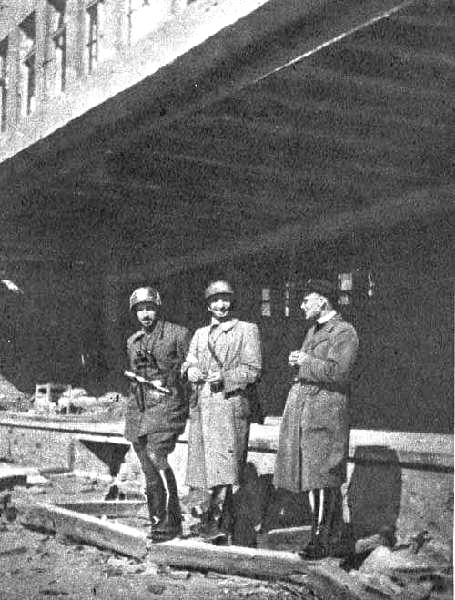
Lt. Zbigniew Brym "Zdunin", Lt. "Piotr" and chaplain cpt. Antoni Czajkowski "Badur" from the 3rd company of Chrobry II Battalion at the Post Office Rail Station at the end of August, 1944

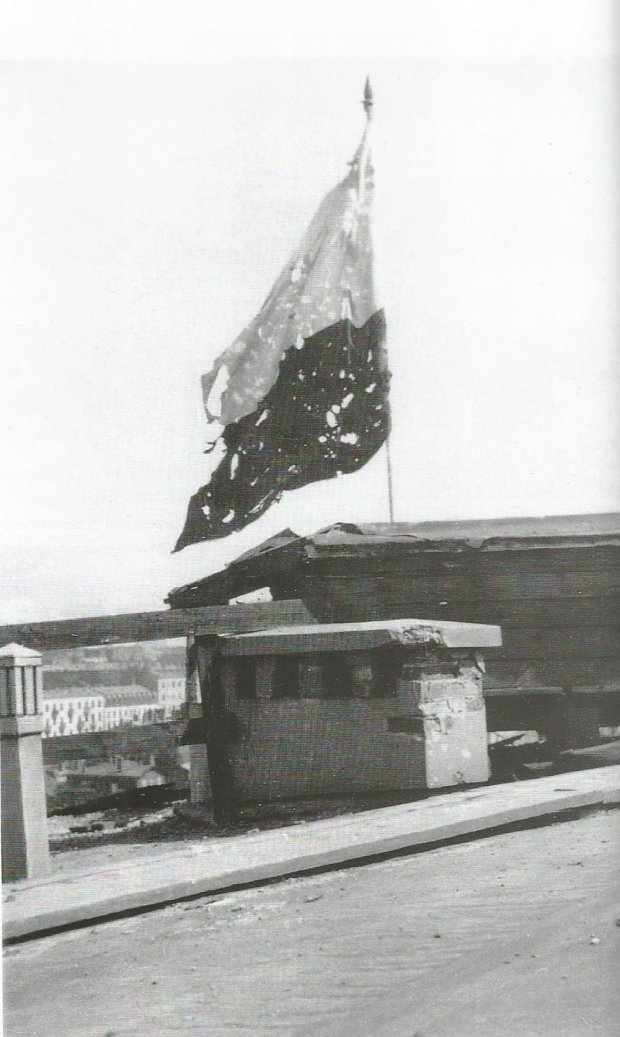
One of Brym's famous actions from the Warsaw Uprising. Rising of a Polish flag on Żelazna street on the last day of the uprising

Zbigniew Brym, nom-de-guerre "Zdunin", (born 1919; died 1 December 2006) was a Polish colonel, soldier of the Home Army, participant in the Warsaw Uprising, photographer and publicist.

He graduated from the Officer Cadet School for Sappers in Modlin. Brym took part in the Polish September Campaign as part of the Independent Operational Group Polesie under General Franciszek Kleeberg. After the Polish defeat he was the commander of one of the sapper companies of the Secret Polish Army and later of Union of Armed Struggle.

During the Warsaw Uprising he led the 3rd company of the Chrobry II Battalion. He was a noted photographer during the uprising, leaving an extensive photographic record. After the uprising he was sent to the Oflag at Gross Born.

He was a member of the Honorary Committee during the construction of the Museum of the Warsaw Uprising.

His brother, Mieczysław Brym (Tolimierz) also took part in the uprising and was killed.
