= Wacław Zagórski =

Wacław Zagórski (1909–1982), nom-de-guerre "Lech Grzybowski", was a Polish lawyer, soldier, and socialist politician. At the end of 1939, he became the head of the underground Socialist-Independentist Organisation "Freedom" in Vilnius. He was a participant in the Warsaw Uprising with the rank of captain and a commander in the famous Chrobry II Battalion. He was decorated with the Order of Virtuti Militari 5th Class in 1944.

In 1973, he was awarded the Righteous Among the Nations medal.
