= Oflag IX-C =

World War II German prisoner-of-war camp

- Molsdorf, Erfurt, Thuringia

Site information
- Type: Prisoner-of-war camp
- Controlled by: Nazi Germany

Location
- Molsdorf, Germany (pre-war borders, 1937)
- Coordinates: 50.89220°N 10.96322°E

Site history
- In use: 1944–1945

Garrison information
- Occupants: Polish women officers

Oflag IX-C was a German prisoner-of-war camp for officers (Offizierlager) during World War II, located just to the south of the village of Molsdorf, near Erfurt in Thuringia.

== Camp history ==
The camp housed women officers of the Armia Krajowa ("Home Army") captured after the 1944 Warsaw Uprising. It consisted of seven wooden barrack huts and an administration building, originally built in 1938 for slave labourers from nearby Buchenwald concentration camp who were working on the autobahn near Erfurt. The camp now came under the administrative command of Stalag IX-C near Bad Sulza. In December 1944, 380 women officers, 38 female orderlies, and three children were brought there from other POW camps: Stalag XI-B Fallingbostel, Stalag XI-B/Z Bergen-Belsen, Gross-Rosen, Stalag IV-E Altenburg, Stalag 344 Lamsdorf, and Stalag X-A Sandbostel. The Senior Polish Officer was Major Wanda Gertz.

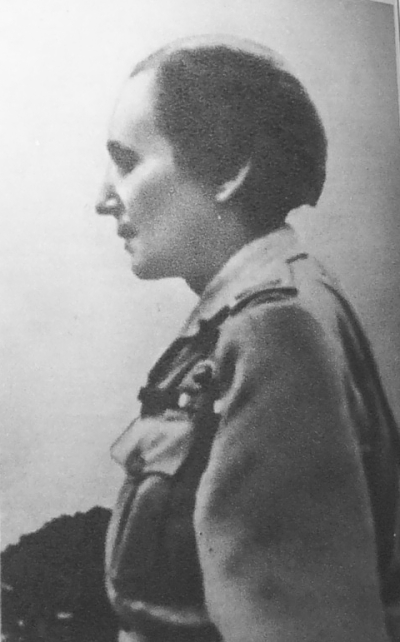
Major Wanda Gertz

The camp was one of the worst Oflags operated by the German Army during the war. The officer in charge, Hauptmann, was reasonably well-disposed but seemingly incapable of improving the situation, according to the testimony of the prisoners. The camp was built on boggy ground, prone to flooding, and was always ankle-deep in thick mud. The wooden huts had been used only temporarily from 1938 to 1939 and then abandoned. As such, they were dilapidated and damp, and they were infested with bedbugs, mice, and rats. There was no heating in the barracks, and temperatures dropped to −17 °C (1 °F) in the winter. Rations were poor, and although eventually some Red Cross packages were sent over from Stalag IX-C, the prisoners lacked any means of cooking, and they had to improvise as well as they could. They burnt paper, cardboard, and wood chips in empty tin cans to boil water, but this practice was soon prohibited by the camp authorities. Washing facilities were non-existent, and there was no hot water. Four Polish doctors did their best without instruments and few drugs, but respiratory diseases and malnourishment were endemic. The camp library consisted of just 105 books, mostly brought by the prisoners themselves. They had no access to a priest, and no religious services were held in the camp.

On 6 February 1945 during a dogfight between two Allied aircraft and a German fighter overhead, two huts were hit by stray gunfire. One prisoner was killed, and sixteen others were wounded.

A delegate of the International Committee of the Red Cross, Dr. H. Landolt, arrived on an inspection tour on 8 March 1945, accompanied by an officer of the German High Command. In his report, he stated: "this camp looks surprisingly like a concentration camp, not like any Oflag that I have seen." The Germans promised to rectify the situation.

However, less than a month later, on 5 April 1945, the prisoners were marched 35 kilometres (21.7 miles) east to Blankenhain, where they were housed in a former Adolf Hitler School. Three days later, on 8 April, troops of the U.S. 89th Infantry Division entered the camp at Molsdorf and found that it contained only thirty prisoners who were too ill to march. Finally, on 13 April, the prisoners at Blankenhain were also liberated by the 89th Division.

== Other camps ==
Between November 1939 and June 1940, the POW camp at Rotenburg an der Fulda in Hesse was designated Oflag IX-C. It then became a sub-camp (Zweiglager) of the camp at Spangenberg and was renamed Oflag IX-A/Z.

== See also ==
- Polish Women in the military
- Women's roles in the World Wars
