= Association of BellTel Retirees =

The Association of BellTel Retirees, Inc. advocates for more than 205,000 Bell Atlantic, NYNEX, GTE, MCI, Idearc Media|Idearc/SuperMedia, and Verizon union and management retirees. The association represents active Verizon employees regarding retiree issues such as cash balance plan conversions and termination of management pension and healthcare benefits.

Official logo of the Association of BellTel Retirees

Corporations have been cutting back on retiree pensions and healthcare coverage. The Association's advocacy works to its goal to prevent widespread cuts for Verizon and SuperMedia retirees.

The 134,000 members of the Association of BellTel Retirees have banded together to fight for the protection of retirees. The association believes that with all retirees acting together they can achieve pension inflation protection and, through congressional action, restore and protect the healthcare benefits that have been chiseled away through passage of federal retiree healthcare protection legislation.

In a class federal action lawsuit, participants in Verizon's (VZ) pension plans who were involuntarily transferred to Idearc's pension plans in November 2006 have pending claims of ERISA violations including:

- Breach of fiduciary duty for failure to comply with pension plan document rules; and
- Other ERISA violations justifying that the federal court order declaratory, injunctive and other equitable relief, and restore the retirees into Verizon's sponsored employee benefit plans.

The Association of BellTel Retirees can be found on Facebook.

Proxy campaign success wins elimination of Verizon executive golden parachutes and bloated executive bonuses in 2003, 2004, 2005 and 2007. The 2003 win was the first time any Bell System Company was ever defeated in a proxy vote in its 125-year history. The association won the Say on Pay proxy by a 50.18% vote in 2007.

== ProtectSeniors.org ==
ProtectSeniors.Org is a Washington, D.C.-based lobbying group founded in 2006 to advocate for retired Americans. It was founded by Verizon retiree members of the Association of BellTel Retirees.

ProtectSeniors.Org is dedicated to the interests of corporate retirees in the United States. The group represents 14.3 million retirees from 392 companies, 45 labor union locals, 98 municipal, state and federal retiree groups and 16 associations.
