= Jakub Michlewicz =

Jakub Michlewicz (or Jakov Michaeli, served under the name Ryszard Trzaskowski, nom-de-guerre Rysiek; 1929 – 2013, Israel) was a Polish Jewish member of the Polish Home Army and a child soldier in the Warsaw Uprising.

== Biography ==
During World War II, after his family was murdered by the Germans, Jakub hid, first in the Polish countryside and then in Warsaw. He joined the Polish Anti-Nazi Resistance group the Home Army almost accidentally, when upon the break out of the Warsaw Uprising he emerged from hiding and was approached by an older boy who was on his way to try and join the resistance and who suggested Jakub come along with him. They were both accepted and on the same day (August 1, 1944) he helped build barricades and participated in a grenade attack on a German car patrol. He was fifteen at the time. Subsequently, he served as a courier for the Chrobry II Battalion Group (1st Battalion, 3rd company) and carried orders to the front lines. He was the youngest member of the unit.

He was wounded towards the end of the uprising and, after the Polish capitulation he was sent to the POW camp in Lamsdorf. Later he was imprisoned at Stalag IV-B in Mühlberg and in Brachwitz. His Jewish ethnicity was never discovered and as a result he survived the war. He emigrated to Israel afterward.
