= Socialist-Independentist Organisation "Freedom" =

Socialist-Independentist Organisation "Freedom" (Polish: Organizacja Socjalistyczno-Niepodległościowa „Wolność”, OSN) was a Polish independence underground organisation of members of the Polish Socialist Party operating since 1939 in Vilnius and then in Warsaw from 1939 to 1941.

== Background ==
In October 1939, an underground group of mainly journalists, writers and artists was founded as the Socialist Organisation "Freedom". As early as November 1939, the group drafted its first programme document, the Ideological Manifesto, in which, opposing the aggression of Germany and the USSR, it was stated that "the main aim of the struggle of the Polish working masses is the restoration of full political independence and sovereignty of Poland, and the consolidation of its existence based on the principles of democracy and social justice". The main author of the manifesto was Wacław Zagórski. Other members of the organisation were: Artur Salman (Stefan Arski), Jan Dąbrowski, Henryk Greniewski, a bit later also: Władysław Malinowski, Feliks Gross and Zbigniew Mitzner. The group maintained contacts with the PPS-WRN and other left-wing organisations. In January 1940, some of the activists left the country and went into exile via Sweden (including Artur Salman and Feliks Gross), and some moved to Warsaw. Consequently, a new Main Committee was formed, consisting of Wacław Zagórski, Zbigniew Mitzner, Andrzej Wróblewski, Henryk Greniewski, Wacław Wagner. From February 1940, the organisation began to publish the periodical Wolność (lit. 'Freedom'). In late Spring of 1940, at a conference, the new name was adopted: Socialist-Independentist Organisation "Freedom".

The organisation was torn by various contradictions, mainly concerning the future of the movement. The chairman of the Main Committee, Zbigniew Mitzner, sought to subordinate the organisation to the PPS-WRN, and was particularly close to Zygmunt Zaremba. Andrzej Wróblewski preferred to associate himself with a more radical group of Stanisław Dubois. Wacław Zagórski preferred to remain independent with the move to a more active conspiracy. Despite attempts to salvage unity in the summer of 1941, the organisation eventually disintegrated. Eventually, in 1941, the group ceased its activities, entering mostly into the PPS-WRN. From February 1942, the magazine Wolność started to come out again under the sign of PPS-WRN. Large portion of members joined the "Gwardia" (lit. 'Guard') organisation, headed by Leszek Raabe.

== Bibliography ==
- Ciesielski, Stanisław (1986). Niepodległość i socjalizm [Independence and Socialism] (in Polish). Warsaw.
- Duraczyński, Eugeniusz (1978). "Socjaliści polscy 1939-1941 (próba charakterystyki postaw i tendencji politycznych)" [Polish Socialists 1939-1941 (attempt to characterise political attitudes and tendencies)]. Dzieje Najnowsze. 10 (2).
