= Stalag IV-E =

Stalag IV-E / Stalag 384
- Altenburg, Thuringia

Site information
- Type: Prisoner-of-war camp
- Controlled by: Nazi Germany

Location
- Altenburg, Germany (pre-war borders, 1937)
- Coordinates: 50.98°N 12.44°E

Site history
- In use: 1940–1945

Stalag IV-E Altenburg was a World War II German Army prisoner-of-war camp located near Altenburg in the state of Thuringia, 45 kilometres (28 mi) south of Leipzig.

== Camp history ==
The camp was opened in June 1940 to hold French prisoners from the Battle of France. Most of the prisoners were sent to Arbeitskommando ("Work Camps"). During Easter 1942 the orchestra and choir performed a "Mass of Consolation and Hope" composed by Jean Lashermes while prisoner in the camp. On 1 June 1942 it was renamed Stalag 384. In October 1944, several hundred women soldiers of the Polish Home Army were transferred to Altenburg from Stalag IV-B and were assigned to various Kommandos in the area. In mid-April 1945 the camp was liberated by units of the 76th Infantry Division, US 7th Army.

== Notable inmates ==
- Jean Lashermes (1901–1972) – French composer.

== See also ==
- List of prisoner-of-war camps in Germany
