= Calel Perechodnik =

Jewish Ghetto Police agent and resistance fighter in the Warsaw uprising

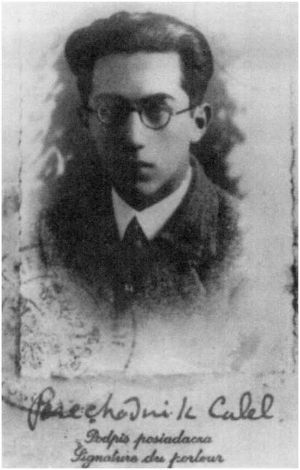
- Born: 8 September 1916; Otwock, Kingdom of Poland
- Died: 1944 (aged 27); Warsaw, Occupied Poland
- Cause of death: Disputed (suicide or burned to death)
- Known for: Jewish ghetto policeman who wrote a memoir of his experience; participant in 1944 Warsaw Uprising

Calel (Calek) Perechodnik (Polish: ['Tsaˈlɛl Pɛˈrɛxɔdnik]; 8 September 1916 – October 1944) was a diarist who joined the Jewish Ghetto Police in the Otwock Ghetto during the Nazi German occupation of Poland. His wartime diaries were published posthumously as Am I a Murderer? (Polish: Czy ja jestem mordercą?) in 1995 by the Karta Centre of Warsaw.

== Biography ==
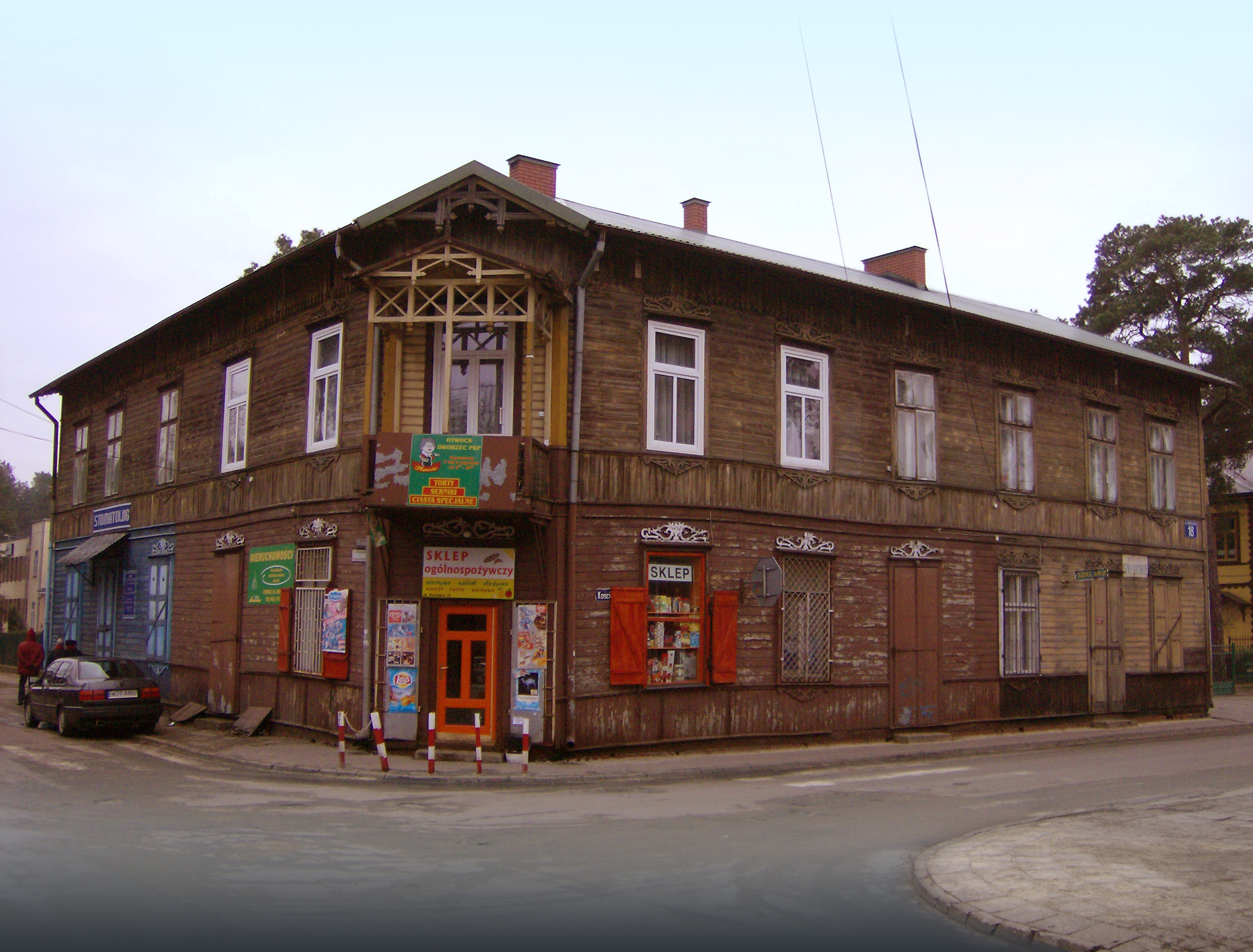
As a child, Perechodnik lived in this wooden building in Otwock.

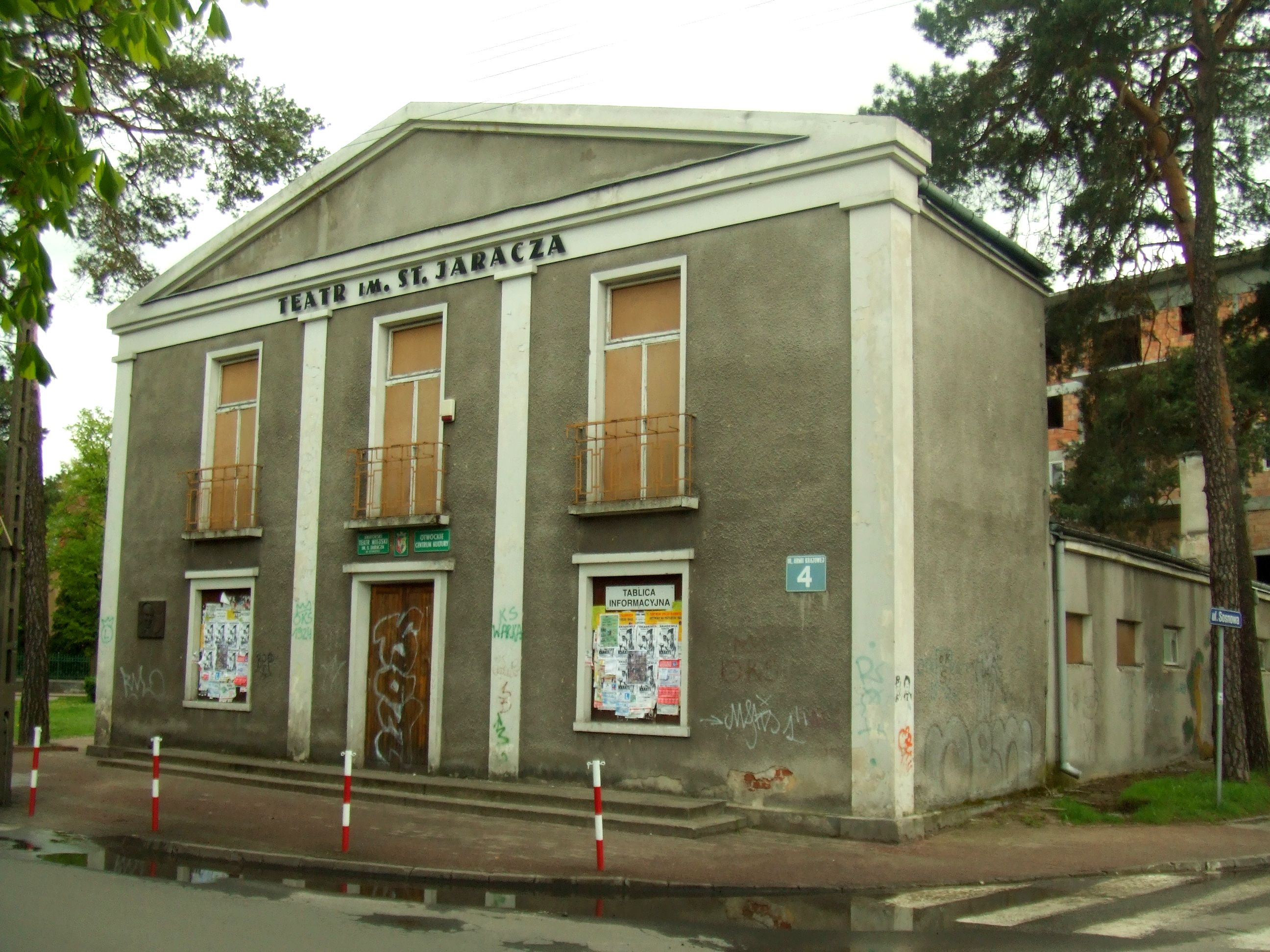
The former Oaza cinema in Otwock, run by the Perechodnik family, later rebuilt as a theater and now undergoing renovation.

=== Pre-war life ===
A secular Jew, Perechodnik was born in 1916 to an Orthodox Jewish family in Otwock, south east of Warsaw. He earned a degree in agronomy at the Warsaw University of Life Sciences and a master's degree at a university in Toulouse, France. Perechodnik's wife Anka (Chana) née Nusfeld was also from Otwock; she ran a cinema named Oasis with her two brothers. Calek and Anka's only daughter Alinka (Athalie), was born on 19 August 1940, a year after the German invasion of Poland.

=== Jewish Ghetto Police ===
In 1940, Perechodnik and his family, along with the other Jews of Otwock, were forced to by the Germans occupying Poland to relocate to the Otwock Ghetto. To provide for himself, his wife, and their daughter (born in the ghetto), in February 1941 Perechodnik joined the Jewish Ghetto Police organized by the Judenrat on German orders.

In early 1942, the German authorities began the ghetto liquidation action. The Jewish police were ordered to assist in the rounding up of Jews who were taken to the station and loaded onto freight trains heading for the Treblinka extermination camp. Assured by the commandant of the Ghetto Police that his family would be protected, on 19 August 1942, Perechodnik brought his own wife and daughter to the ghetto's main square. But he was betrayed: Anka and Alinka were among the 8,000 Otwock Jews murdered at Treblinka. Subsequently, he was sent to a labour camp. Perechodnik constantly blamed himself for the death of his wife and daughter. Prior to their deportation to Treblinka, Anka asked Calek on several occasions to obtain a false kennkarte for her, identifying her as an ethnic Pole since she did not have the typical Jewish looks. Calel later wrote that she could easily pass for a Pole if she dyed her hair. Perechodnik failed to obtain the kennkarte for his wife in time, partly due to his laziness and partly due to his "lack of trust in such things".

=== In hiding ===
On 20 August 1942, Calel Perechodnik escaped to Warsaw. His father, Aryan in appearance, remained at large to support the family until he was captured by the Gestapo and executed. Calel spent 105 days in hiding with his mother and other Jews in the apartment of a Polish woman risking her own life to save them. While in hiding, he spent the time writing. The last entry in his memoir concerns his last will and is dated 23 October 1943. He then joined the Polish Underground; it was during this time that he contracted typhus.

On 1 August 1944, the Warsaw Uprising began as part of a nationwide Operation Tempest. Perechodnik participated in the uprising as part of the Chrobry II Battalion. There are several theories as to how he died. One states that he committed suicide by swallowing cyanide after the Uprising failed. Other claims that he was killed by pillagers after the uprising. Another account (stated in the letter of Henryk Romanowski to his brother Pesach Perechodnik, following the memoirs in the book) claims he was burned alive in a bunker, unable to get out because of the typhus. He was aged 27.

== Am I a Murderer? ==
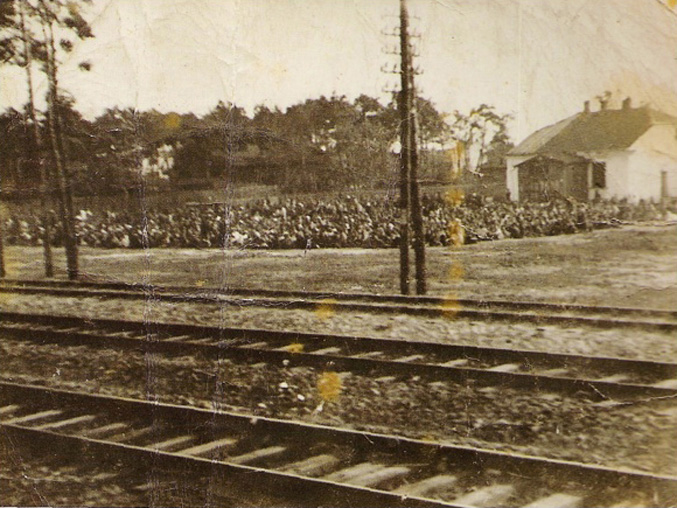
Clandestine photo showing layover yard in Otwock on 19 August 1942. In the distance, Jews sit on the ground overnight, while awaiting transport to Treblinka extermination camp.

Perechodnik wrote his memoir between 7 May and 19 August 1943 in Warsaw, during his stay at the home of his Polish rescuer. When describing the German occupation of Poland he attempts to explain his own actions which were inspired by fear, but also, blames the Jews for claiming to have been a chosen people, thus encouraging anti-Semitism among the gentile population. He expresses his outrage at the refusal by some Orthodox Jews to send their children to Polish orphanages which would have saved them from the Holocaust. Perechodnik expressed his anguish and astonishment at the savagery of war. It was, he wrote, "the greatest disillusionment that I have endured in my life."

The Jewish Ghetto Police which he joined, was not a benevolent force by any means. Emanuel Ringelblum referred to it as 'the direct instrument of extermination'. One of the first clandestine operations of the Jewish Combat Organization (ŻOB) in Warsaw, was to assassinate its commanders. Perechodnik's account therefore, needs to be seen in its proper perspective. His memoir describes such events as his and his father's compliance with the Polish radio broadcast command to go eastward to fight in 1939, the formation of the Judenrat in Otwock, Himmler's visit to Warsaw, the death of Czerniakow, the rounding up of Jews in the ghettos; life in, and escape from, a work camp; the experience of being hidden in Warsaw, the beginning of understanding of what was happening in the death camps, the 1943 Warsaw Ghetto Uprising, and the 1944 Warsaw Uprising. His information is now considered by various researchers and experts on the Holocaust to be remarkably accurate, and according to these researchers, the notes show proof that the Jews at that time knew what was happening.

Shortly before Perechodnik died in 1944, he entrusted his manuscript to a Polish friend. After the war ended, the memoir was given to Perechodnik's brother, Pesach Perechodnik, who had survived the war in the Soviet Union. The original copy of the memoir was presented to the Yad Vashem Archives, and a copy was given to the Central Jewish Historical Commission in Poland, which today is the Jewish Historical Institute. This document was first published as a complete book in 1995 by the Karta Centre of Warsaw. It remained virtually unknown in English-speaking countries until Frank Fox's translation in 1996. It was released in Polish and Hebrew prior to its translation into English in 1996. Since then, it has been translated into many languages.

Its original title was A History of a Jewish Family During German Occupation, but its title was later changed to Am I a Murderer?: Testament of a Jewish Ghetto Policeman. It was recently republished in Poland in an unabridged version, with comprehensive sidenotes and references, under the title Spowiedź (Confession).

In his final years, Perechodnik completely changed his attitude towards the Jews and the Jewish faith and traditions. In his memoir, he rejected belief in God and the religious traditions of his Orthodox Jewish family. He became very bitter toward the Jews and frequently criticised them, even blaming them for bringing these events on themselves because of their insistence on cultural and religious isolation. He was sarcastic about others, as well as self-deprecating about his own Jewishness.

Perechodnik wrote the following about the role of ethnic Poles during the Holocaust:

I have lived for twenty-six years among the Poles, embraced Polish culture and literature, loved Poland, looked on her as another motherland, and only in the last year have I recognized the true faces of Poles. I would gladly describe the facts of every noble behavior toward Jews, but I cannot be silent in the face of the vileness of those who, out of the desire for profit or out of blind hatred, sacrificed the lives of hundreds of thousands of people. One has to look truth squarely in the eye. Jews perished first of all because they didn’t realize in time what level German cruelty and barbarism would reach. They were well aware, however, of the vileness of some Poles. They knew what it was that closed before them the gates of the Polish neighborhood and forced them to wait in the ghetto for the near and inevitable sentence of death. I am not in the least blind. I do not consider it to be a duty of every Pole to hide, at the risk of his own life, every Jew. But I believe that it was the responsibility of the Polish society to enable Jews to move freely within the Polish neighborhood. Polish society is guilty of not strongly condemning the «trackers» of Jews.
