= Silver surfer (internet user) =

Individual over the age of 50 who uses the internet

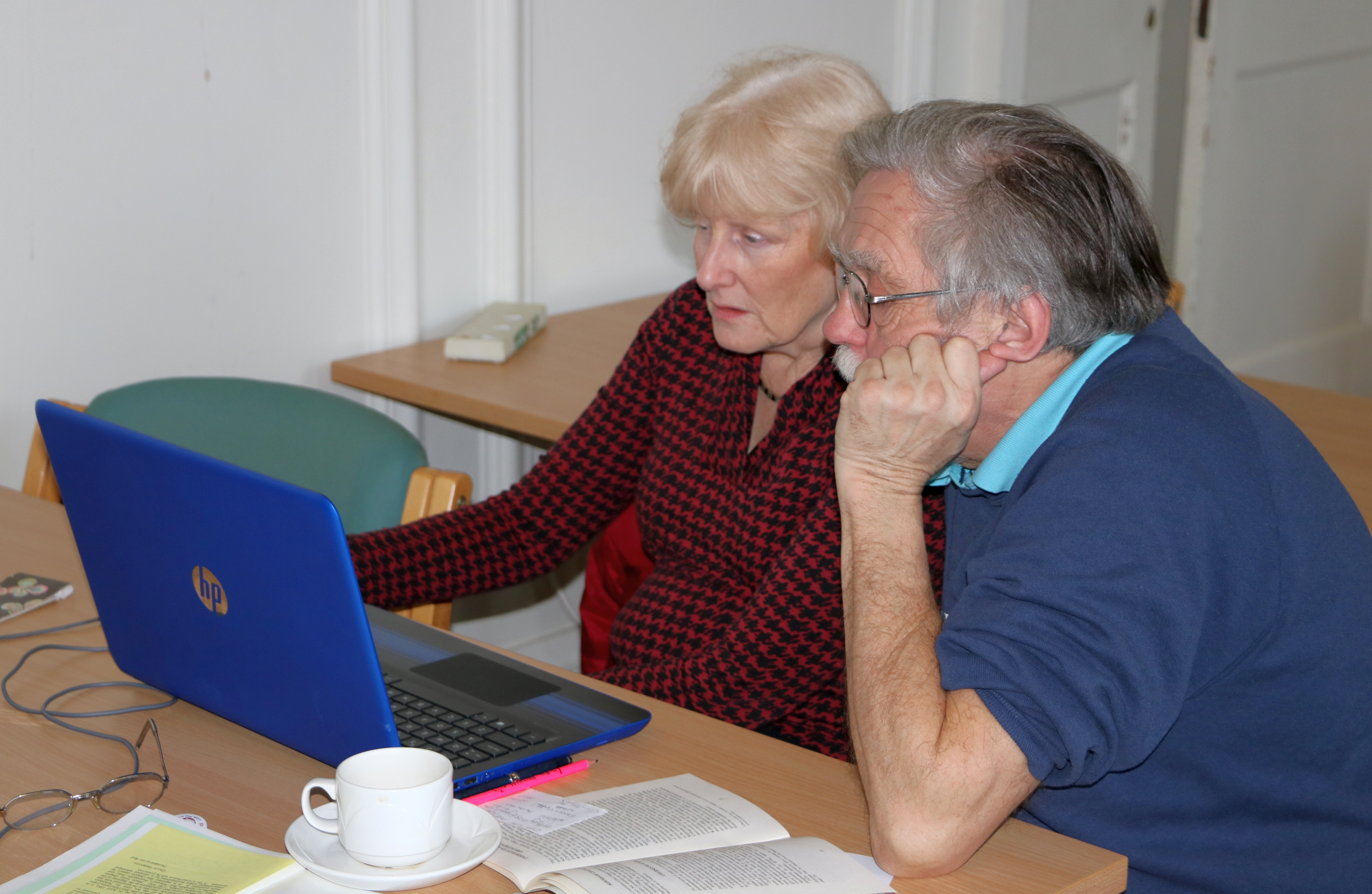
Teaching editing skills at a Wikipedia training day in England

Silver surfer refers to the population of elderly individuals who utilize the internet on a consistent basis.

== History ==
Silver surfers is the term widely used in the UK, Australia and some other English speaking countries to describe people who are aged over 50 and who use the internet on a frequent basis. The number of older users has increased dramatically over the past several years due to their being more accustomed to the technology. It has been determined that this age group uses the internet on average four hours more per month than the age group 18–24, and spend a majority of their time using search engines and online shopping sites. Other sources indicate that this growing trend among the older population is due to the increase in use of social networking sites to stay in touch with family members or close friends that live far away. Studies point to Skype, Facebook, email, and instant messaging are all highlighted as commonly used, mainly because the means for communicating have become more available and free.

The amount of silver surfers using the internet in the UK is now estimated to be over 18 million in 2023 with about 9 million of them using Facebook. The website www.silversurfers.com is the largest online community for the over 50s in the UK with over 1.5 million members and followers.

While the rise in internet use among the younger population has led to fears of isolation, it is argued that the increase in use for the older population has done the exact opposite. A study was conducted that surveyed over 8,000 individuals over the age of 50 on the extent of their social-networking use. The results showed that individuals who used the internet more consistently were 1/3 less likely to be depressed. Depression for this age group is argued to arise from lack of mobility and feeling out of touch, but the ability to keep close contact has reversed this phenomenon – internet use is thought to increase avenues of communication and feelings of independence.

A separate study analyzed the brain function of individuals after using the internet for a week, and found that it improved nerve function in the older group.

In the UK, the government's Office for National Statistics (ONS) found that the percentage of pensioners aged 75 or over who had recently used the internet had increased from 19.9% in 2011 to 40.5% in 2017, and to 47% by 2019. Amongst younger pensioners (between 65 and 74 years old), the proportion who had recently used the internet had increased over that time from 52% in 2011 to 77.5% in 2017, and to 83% by 2019. Over the same time period, the usage figures changed little for the most active sector of internet users (adults aged 16 to 44 years).
