= Bob Entrop =

Dutch malacologist

Christiaan Johannes (Bob) Entrop (16 November 1917, The Hague - 3 July 1987, The Hague) was a Dutch malacologist.

Entrop was the author of the popular 1959 book Schelpen vinden en herkennen (Thieme - Zutphen, 3e printing 1972, 320 p.) and the booklet Schelpen die men kan vinden. 120 Europese schelpen in kleuren (Thieme - Zutphen, 1975, 72 p.).

In 1966 he started a private museum called In de schulp to house his own collection, of over 250,000 shells from 200 families. It formed the basis for the Zeemuseum, which later became part of Muzee Scheveningen.

During World War II, Entrop was a prisoner of war in Stalag IV-B in Germany. With fellow prisoner Joh. Mulder he wrote the book Prikkeldraad ("Barbed Wire", 1946). His son, the filmmaker Bob Entrop Jr., made a movie of the same title, in which seven former POWs give their account of their period in the camp.
