= National Armed Forces =

Polish anti-Soviet nationalist paramilitary organization

- Narodowe Siły Zbrojne (NSZ)
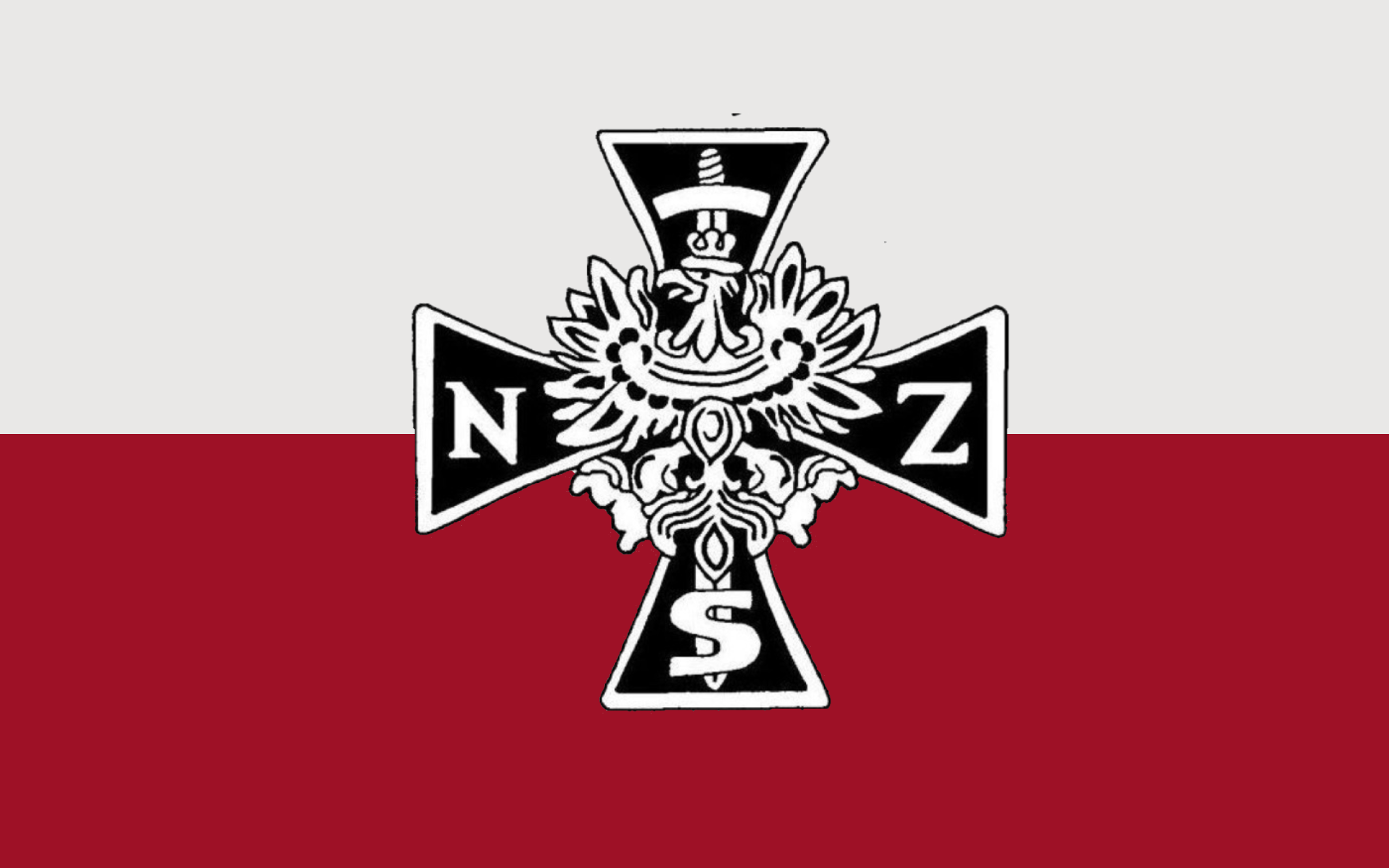
- Active: 20 September 1942 – 1947
- Country: German-occupied Poland
- Allegiance: Polish Underground State
- Type: Paramilitary
- Role: Closely linked to the National Democracy
- Size: c. 80,000 (1942)

Commanders
- Notable commanders: Ignacy Oziewicz; Tadeusz Kurcyusz; Zygmunt Broniewski

The National Armed Forces (Polish: Narodowe Siły Zbrojne; NSZ) was a Polish right-wing underground military organization of the National Democracy operating from 1942. During World War II, NSZ troops fought against communist partisans and the Home Army.

At the end of the war, some units and structures of this organization cooperated with the Nazis and Gestapo (as in the case of the Holy Cross Mountains Brigade and Hubert Jura) and committed crimes motivated by antisemitism.

Most NSZ units did not submit to the Polish government-in-exile and engaged in fratricidal engagements with other Polish partisan units. From 1944 to 1946, the NSZ fought as part of the anti-communist resistance, including after the postwar Polish People's Republic was established.

== History ==
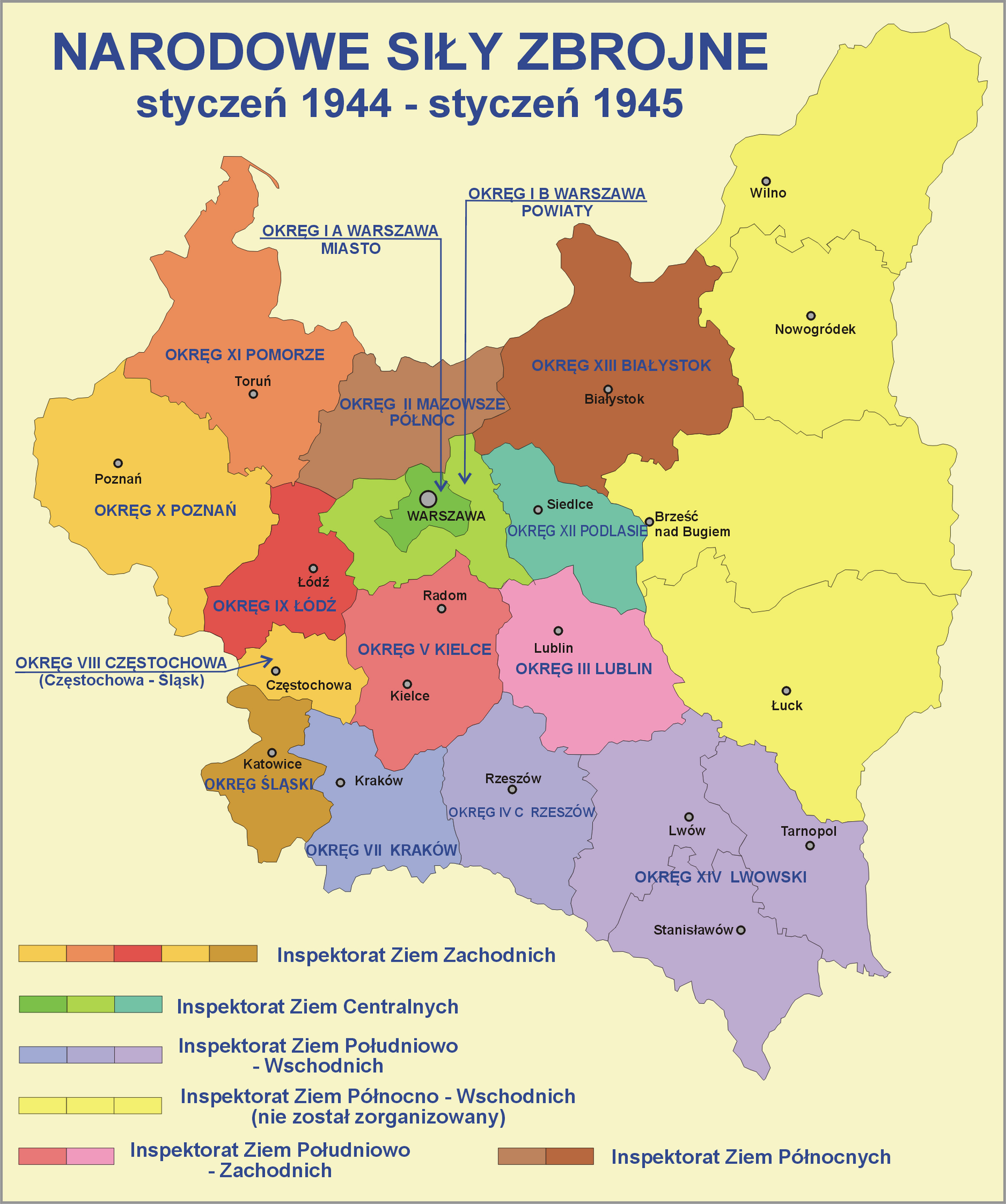
Territorial structure and organization of the NSZ

The NSZ was created on September 20, 1942, as a result of the merger of the Military Organization Lizard Union (Organizacja Wojskowa Związek Jaszczurczy) and part of the National Military Organization (Narodowa Organizacja Wojskowa). At its maximum strength in 1943–44, the NSZ reached between 70,000 and 75,000 members, making it the third-largest organization of the Polish resistance (after the Home Army (AK) and the Bataliony Chlopskie). NSZ units participated in the Warsaw Uprising.

In March 1944 the NSZ split, with the more moderate faction coming under the command of the AK. The other part became known as the NSZ-ZJ (the Lizard Union). This branch of the NSZ conducted operations against Polish communist activists, partisans and secret police, the Soviet partisans, NKVD and SMERSH, and their own (NSZ) former leaders.

== Structure ==
On April 1, 1944, the NSZ had 376 sworn soldiers in Białystok assigned to 5 companies, 15 platoons and 45 squads. The function of the commander of the Białystok-city district was held by Michał Gałkowski "Mit" from March 1944. During this period, the issue of merging the entire armed national conspiracy with the Home Army returned. The young nationalists published "Nasz Czyn", and their most effective action was probably an attack on the Becker factory in March 1944.

== Political stance ==
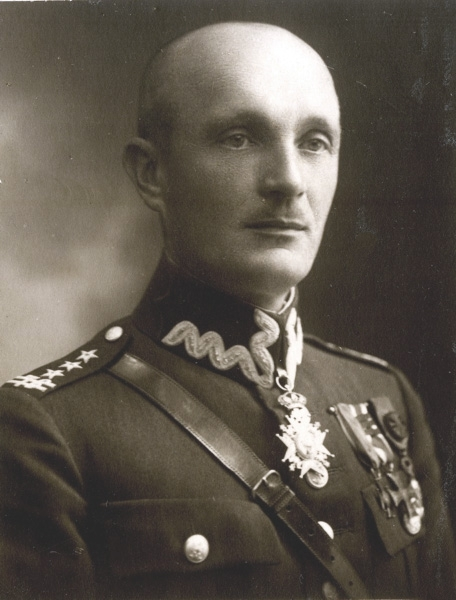
Colonel Ignacy Oziewicz, the first commander of the National Armed Forces

The NSZ's program included the fight for Polish independence against Nazi Germany as well as against the Soviet Union. Its goal was to keep the Second Polish Republic's prewar eastern territories and borders, while regaining additional former German territories to the west, which they deemed "ancient Slavic lands". The General Directive Nr. 3 of the National Armed Forces General Command, L. 18/44 from January 15, 1944, reads:

"In the face of crossing of Polish borders by Soviet forces, the Polish Government in London and its Polish citizens living on the territory of Poland express their unwavering desire for the return of the sovereignty to the entire area of Poland within the Polish borders established prior to 1939 through the mutually-binding Treaty of Riga and reaffirmed by the general principles of the Atlantic Charter, as well as by the declarations of the Allied governments which did not concede to any territorial changes that took place in Poland after August 1939."

During the war, the NSZ fought the Polish communists, including their military organizations such as the Gwardia Ludowa (GL) and the Armia Ludowa (AL). After the war, former NSZ members were persecuted by the newly installed communist government of the Polish People's Republic. Reportedly, communist partisans engaged in planting false evidence, such as documents and forged receipts at the sites of their own robberies, in order to blame the NSZ. It was a method of political warfare practiced against the NSZ also by the Ministry of Public Security of Poland and Milicja Obywatelska (MO) right after the war, as revealed by communist Poland's court documents.

== National Armed Forces and Jews ==
The National Armed Forces (though not uniformly) did not accept Jews in their ranks, and expressed explicit anti-semitic sentiment.

The solution of the Jewish question is almost as important for the future of our nation as the regaining of independence. The loss of independence and the continuation of Jewish presence in Poland are both an equal danger of slow death for the Poles.

— National Armed Forces newspaper Szaniec, cited in Gazeta Wyborcza, 24–5 September 1993

We may condemn the Germans for their bestial methods but we must not forget that Jewry was always and will remain a destructive element in our state organism. The liquidation of the Jews in the Polish territories is of great importance for future development because it frees us from a million-headed parasite.

— National Armed Forces newspaper Barykada, no. 3, March 1943

From November 1944 to mid-1947, during the period of armed anti-communist insurgency against the Soviet takeover of Poland, many Jews who were part of communist groups were killed by the National Armed Forces. In Warsaw, the National Armed Forces killed Jerzy Makowiecki and Ludwik Widerszal, two Polish Home Army officers of Jewish origin. Polish historian Alina Cała said that the doctrine of the National Armed Forces was primarily the elimination of what they considered to be Communist bands. According to sociologist Tadeusz Piotrowski, these attacks later "became more focused on individual Jews who were placed in highly visible positions of authority in the PRL [People's Republic of Poland]".

In some districts, the National Armed Forces actively pursued Jews. Some units of the National Armed Forces were on the lookout for Jews hiding in the forests to deliver to the Germans. In Radom, the National Armed Forces cooperated with the Germans towards that goal in 1943–1944. According to the Encyclopedia of the Holocaust, Polish Jews who had sought shelter among ethnic Poles after escaping from ghettos were directly murdered by the National Armed Forces.

According to other sources, many National Armed Forces soldiers and their families are credited with having saved Jews, including such noted ones as Maria Bernstein, Leon Goldman, Jonte Goldman, and Dr. Turski. The National Armed Forces did have Jews in its ranks, including Calel Perechodnik, Wiktor Natanson, Captain Roman Born-Bornstein (chief physician of the Chrobry II unit), Jerzy Zmidygier-Konopka, Feliks Pisarewski-Parry, Eljahu (Aleksander) Szandcer (nom de guerre Dzik), Dr. Kaminski, a physician who served in an NSZ unit led by Captain Władysław Kolaciński (nom de guerre Zbik), Major Stanisław Ostwind-Zuzga, and others.

In January 1945, the National Armed Forces Holy Cross Mountains Brigade (Brygada Świętokrzyska) retreated before the advancing Red Army and, after negotiating a ceasefire with the Germans, moved into the Nazi-controlled Protectorate of Bohemia and Moravia. It resumed operations against the Nazis on 5 May 1945 in Bohemia, where the brigade liberated prisoners from a concentration camp in Holýšov, including 280 Jewish women prisoners slated for death.

== Postwar ==
Members of the NSZ, like other "cursed soldiers", and their families were persecuted during the postwar Stalinist period. In the fall of 1946, 100-200 soldiers of an NSZ unit under the command of Henryk Flame, nom de guerre "Bartek," were lured into a trap and massacred by communist military and police forces. On December 10, 1946, the District Military Court in Warsaw issued a verdict in the trial of the NSZ command. It was one of many trials organized in the pre-election period to intimidate society. Among those sentenced to death were NSZ officers Col. Piotr Abakanowicz and Michał Pobocha, as well as Stefania Broniewska, the wife of the NSZ commander-in-chief Zygmunt Broniewski, who was in exile. On March 2, 1948, the verdict was announced in the trial of the NSZ Headquarters, accused by the communists of fascism. The District Military Court in Warsaw sentenced to death Col. Stanisław Ksznica and Lech Neyman.

Some of the NSZ were responsible for the 1946 pacification of villages in northeast Poland, in which ethnic Belarusian Polish citizens were attacked; 79 were killed. The National Armed Forces were officially dissolved in 1947.

In 1992, acknowledging its contribution to the fight for Poland's sovereignty, Polish authorities recognized National Armed Forces underground soldiers as war veterans. NSZ soldiers were rehabilitated, including some controversial ones, for instance, Mieczysław Pazderski, who in 1945 murdered almost 200 Ukrainian villagers in Wierzchowina, and who was awarded two medals by Polish president Lech Wałęsa. The Polish Parliament Sejm passed a bill in 2012 commemorating the 70th anniversary of the creation of Narodowe Siły Zbrojne in 1942. Members of the Sejm who supported the resolution pointed out that NSZ members became the most obstinate target of repressions and hate propaganda by security apparatus under Stalinism.

In the 1990s the topic of "cursed soldiers", or anti-communist partisans, was not discussed much in Poland. By the 2000s however, the cult of "cursed soldiers" gained prominence. In 2012, the Polish Parliament (Sejm) passed a bill commemorating the 70th anniversary of the creation of Narodowe Siły Zbrojne in 1942.

The role of NSZ and its relations with the Jews remains a controversial topic in modern Poland. The 2012 Sejm declaration has been criticized by former Polish Prime Minister Leszek Miller. Several members of parliament criticized the bill and walked out of a related commemorative ceremony.

== Commandants of National Armed Forces ==
- Col. Ignacy Oziewicz (September 1942 – June 1943)
- Col. Tadeusz Kurcyusz (August 1943 – April 1944)
- Col. Stanisław Nakoniecznikoff-Klukowski (April 1944 – July 1944)
- Gen. Tadeusz Jastrzębski (July 1944 – October 1944)
- Col. Stanisław Nakoniecznikoff-Klukowski (October 1944)
- Gen. Zygmunt Broniewski (October 1944 – August 1945)
- Col. Stanisław Kasznica (August 1945 – February 1947)

== See also ==
- Forest Brothers
- Cursed soldiers
- Ukrainian Insurgent Army
- Stanisław Ostwind-Zuzga
