= Szepsi (disambiguation) =

Szepsi is a Hungarian name of a Slova town Moldava nad Bodvou.

Szepsi may also refer to:

- Márton Szepsi Csombor – Hungarian travel writer, poet and reformed pastor (1595–1622)
- Máté Szepsi Laczkó (1576–1633), Hungarian Calvinist priest, teacher, chronicler, and winemaker
