= Prostitution in Poland =

Prostitution in Poland is legal, but operating brothels or other forms of pimping or coercive prostitution and prostitution of minors are prohibited.

== History ==
=== Early period ===
The travelling prostitute is recorded in the tenth century. Dozens of brothels thrived on the outskirts of central Warsaw since its establishment as the national capital in the sixteenth century, as in other large Polish cities and towns. These cities established municipal brothels and taxed both prostitutes and brothel keepers. The first recorded brothel (Dom publiczny - literally public house) in Poland is considered to be in Bochnia in the 15th century, which catered to merchants who came to buy salt from the mines there.

A Hungarian explorer to Poland in the early seventeenth century, Márton Szepsi Csombor, wrote that when he passed through Lipnica Murowana they were "surrounded by a swarm of unclean maidens to flatter and compliment us and play and sing". In Bochnia the city authorities from time to time passed ordinances against "harlots and loose people". In 1610 the mayor and town councillors appointed fines, and an ordinance from 1743 called for severe punishment for adultery. The trade guilds demanded a proper "moral" life of its members, one of the articles of the butcher's guild set a payment of 12 cents into a box for "debauchery or starting a conversation with a married woman".

From the fifteenth century, police inspected brothels and removed women thought to be infected. The sixteenth century saw the establishment of venereal disease hospitals such as St. Sebastian's in Kraków in 1528 and St. Lazarus, in Warsaw.

=== Nineteenth century (Polish Partition) ===
During the period of Polish Partition (1795–1918) prostitution flourished openly, whereas previously (Polish-Lithuanian Commonwealth) (1648–1795) it had been confined to brothels and back streets near army garrisons. The official position of the occupying Russian authorities was that prostitution was a "necessary evil" (zło konieczne), and reflected the administration of prostitution in Russia. The administration was the responsibility of the police under the Ministry of the Interior. Local committees made of police and physicians administered the regulations.

Polish garrisons had their own brothels, and as Europe progressively adopted the Napoleonic system of regulation, state-regulated prostitution became established in 1802 (in Prussian and Russian Poland) and in 1859 in Austrian Galicia. In 1843 the Russian governor introduced a tax on brothels and prostitution, and 30 years later created the committees to oversee regulation. The regulations required all women in commercial sex to register and undergo regular gynecological examinations which were recorded in 'passports'. Despite this, there existed an illegal sector of women who chose not to become part of the public register.

As police regulated the zoning of brothels away from the public eye, professional prostitutes moved toward working as independents. The regulations were very detailed. The police allowed a premise to open if it was situated at least 315 metres from a church or school, while advertising was prohibited. Other regulations included forbidding a premise to operate under the guise of another institution, such as cafes and billiard room. Portraits of the Royal Family or other state symbols were forbidden, as was hanging out of windows incompletely dressed. Fees varied with the class of institution and proprietors kept three-quarters of the proceeds, for overheads. There was no charge for the treatment of syphilis. The public could inspect the medical records before selecting a worker – but she could refuse a client if he was drunk. Although there were penalties for overworking the women, they were obliged to service 10–12 clients a day. Similar regulations were in effect in the Prussian-occupied territories. The Austro-Hungarian Empire was less centrally controlled than that of Russia and Prussia. On the other hand, women could be transported anywhere in the empire. Under Empress Maria Theresa and the Constitutio criminalis Theresiana, things were less tolerant, and amongst other things the Morals Police were introduced, although ultimately all these measures proved futile.

In parallel, police closed many of the larger brothels due to public pressure. Police had the powers to forcibly register women they suspected, which could simply be women having relationships outside of marriage.

A number of factors contributed to the growth of the sex trade in nineteenth-century Poland, including increasing urbanization, with growing cities and a population shift from the land to the towns and cities. The increasing feminization of poverty was also a contributing factor. So prevalent was paid sex amongst domestic servants, that a 1913 regulation required them to register for medical exams as well. A second class was waitresses, and after 1906, they too were registered.

As the supply increased, so did the demand. 40% of Warsaw university students stated that their first sexual encounter was commercial, and estimates at the time suggested that over 80% of high school and university students bought sex. As throughout history, the military was a major source of demand, and because of concerns about venereal disease, authorities instituted regulations similar to those in the British Empire (Contagious Diseases Acts), requiring any young woman on her own to submit to examination.

A great deal of attention began to be paid to prostitution during this period. This increased attention needs to be interpreted in the light of nineteenth-century European attitudes to prostitution, where it was becoming the subject of almost daily discourse. The second wave of moral panic also swept Poland during the Second Republic (1918–1939). However what was often neglected was that Polish sex workers comprised a potentially upwardly mobile, economically ambitious lower class, that contributed significantly to Polish social and economic life.

Household servants, nursemaids, and wet nurses were among those known to rely on commercial sex to supplement their low wages, while middle-class husbands and their adolescent sons became regular clientele. Unsavoury images of prostitution, such as Jack the Ripper "Kuba rozpruwacz" were imported from abroad.

Physicians sounded the alarm about a rise in syphilis rates, while the Roman Catholic Church, middle-class charities, and Jewish aid agencies set up societies to rescue "fallen women" from the wages of sin. Chastity or "purity" societies, and women's groups organized meetings and conferences. Feminists composed moral treatises and established international organizations to combat the trafficking of women. "White slavery" attracted much media attention as in other countries. However, the bulk of the concern related to the open display of solicitation in public places. Public discourse emphasized not only this deviant behaviour but also the victim role, trapped and in the hands of pimps and traffickers. These stories were mingled with antisemitism, as the perpetrators (like infamous Zvi Migdal) were frequently depicted as Jewish. These scenes also appeared in the literature of the day, such as Bronislaw Szczygielski's A Woman - A Body: The Odyssey of a Fallen Woman (Kobieta-Cialo: Odyseja kobiety upadlej, Warsaw, 1914).

During the First World War, the establishment of brothels on the Russian Front was considered a major strategic initiative, despite protests from Empress Zyta. Naturally separate institutions were required for officers, non-commissioned officers, and privates.

=== Second Republic (1918–1939) ===
The new Polish authorities were faced with a large number of problems arising from the recently ceased hostilities. One of the first acts of the newly reconstituted nation was the Basic Sanitation Law of July 1919 (Zasadnicza ustawa sanitarna). Under this law, brothels were suppressed on 6 September 1922, while setting up a system of supervision of independent workers. A maximum of two workers were allowed in any house.

The State brought many cases of prosecution against organized prostitution and pimps during this period.

=== Postwar period (People's Republic 1945–1989) ===
In the aftermath of Second World War, Poland became a communist state, known as the People's Republic of Poland. Prostitution did not exist officially, as it was a maxim of Marxism, that prostitution would disappear in a socialist society with equality of means. Nonetheless, it was widespread. People who extorted sex workers were occasionally prosecuted.

The main centres were hotels and restaurants and the main client's foreigners. As such prostitution formed an important source of hard currency. Despite this, the Republic's special services were actually running hotel rings. In this way, they could obtain information about foreigners, compromise and extort people.

==== 1945–1948 ====
In the initial years (1945–1948) there was a registration scheme, and special sections were set up to deal with "enemies of morality" (wrogami moralności), but this was abolished when other priorities engaged the State. 1948–1952 saw forced labour camps. Despite continued efforts to eradicate prostitution, many elements of centrally-planned socialism actually contributed to it, such as the 'Great Socialist Construction' (wielkie budowy socjalizmu) which saw the migration of large numbers of men. A memo from the Secretariat of the Party Central Committee (including Bolesław Bierut who was then Secretary-General), dated 23 November 1955, states that in 1949 there were 4,000 sex workers in Poland, in 1954 1,700 and that 6,000 had been arrested. It also refers to the difficulties in the struggle to abolish the practice. It refers to the prewar period when "prostitution not only was not a crime but on the contrary - officially recognized and protected by the state". Data from the Ministry of the Interior, dated 9 February 1957 refer to 1,500 workers in the six major cities.

==== 1960–1983 ====
The period from the 1960s saw a slight ideological "thaw" that culminated in the fall of the Iron Curtain (Żelazna kurtyna) in 1989. Changes in Polish society included increasing tourism and trade with the West, acceptability of foreign currency and expanding hotel business, all factors conducive to the growth of the sex trade. Although liable to a large error margin, estimates of the numbers of sex workers were 7,267 in 1962, and 9,847 in 1969. Sometimes referred to as "Servants of Venus" (Służebnice Wenery), sex workers started to become one of the higher income earning groups. Venues included market towns, port cities, hotels and environs and around railway stations. Well known areas for the less wealthy included the East Side and cafes along Aleje Jerozolimskie as well as the famous Pigalak area in Warsaw.

This period was notable for a criminal case involving the porters at the Hotel Europejski who were living off the trade they supplied. However, these prosecutions were the exception in a trade largely opaque to the authorities and an important part of the economy. A single client could net a sex worker the equivalent of an average monthly wage, and some could make the same as corporate executives. Both workers and clients benefited - for instance, a US10 fee for a "short service" was very affordable for foreign visitors, and only 20% of prices in West Germany.

==== Martial Law (1981–1983) and the liberalisation of the 80s ====
The martial law (Stan wojenny) period was a difficult time for sex workers but quickly gave way to a more liberal period. However the AIDS epidemic also reduced the demand for paid sex. This was partly offset by the reduction in censorship, allowing newspaper advertising, for instance in Kurier Polski. This period also saw the arrival of escort businesses.

==== Research ====
Because of ideological reasons, there was very little research done during this time, other in forensic literature, at least until the 90s. Examples include Pawlik's study of Kraków prostitutes (1991) or that of Jasińska in the Tricity area (Trójmiasto) in 1991.

=== Post-liberation (1989) ===
The collapse of the Soviet regime and the fall of the iron curtain, many aspects of Polish life changed considerably. Escort agencies, erotic massage salons, porn movie theatres and sex shops appeared very soon. Escort agencies are registered businesses, and circumvent laws. (Plywaczewski 2007)

== Current status ==
Prostitution is legal, but operating brothels or other forms of pimping or coercive prostitution and prostitution of minors are prohibited, as is living off someone else's prostitution.

Prostitution is present in various forms in the country and a 2007 US State Department report stated that many women who worked as prostitutes were employed in massage parlors and escort services that functioned as brothels, although technically illegal. Prostitution is the only profession in Poland that is not taxed, but prostitutes may be asked by authorities to prove that is what they do, since prostitution is not recognized as legitimate work, and therefore receive no social benefits.

Various attempts have been made to limit overt street prostitution.

== Demographics ==
The total number of prostitutes in Poland is not known, estimates vary widely and should be interpreted with caution. For instance, the US 2009 Human Rights Report states that: "according to police there were an estimated 3,300 prostitutes in the country; however, NGOs estimated that there were 18,000 to 20,000 women involved in all aspects of the sex industry." The International Encyclopedia of Sexuality writes that "the police estimate that there are about 12,000 prostitutes working in Poland."

=== Migration ===
The 2009 TAMPEP study found only 33% of prostitutes are migrant workers in Poland, compared to a European average of 47-50%, with only a slight increase since 2006. Poland ranks 8th amongst countries of origin, constituting 4% of the migrant sex worker population in Europe, a percentage that has been declining. Migratory trends in Poland are changing. Poland has become a transit country for sex workers from Romania and Bulgaria, while the biggest group of sex workers in Poland is from Ukraine. The number and proportion of migrant sex workers vary by region. Poland is still primarily a country of origin.

There are women from countries such as Ukraine and Belarus, who sell sex in Poland, but their numbers are uncertain. CATW cites the Polish Deputy Interior Minister in stating a figure of at least 3,500 Bulgarian women working in prostitution in Poland and another 1,000 or more from Ukraine and Belarus.

A 2009 TAMPEP report states that 66% of prostitutes in Poland are nationals and the rest are migrants, of which 91% come from Eastern Europe, mainly Ukraine, Russia and Belarus. The same study also states that Poland distinguishes itself among the countries studied in that report by its high prevalence of male prostitution, with 15% of prostitutes being said to be male, more than double the European average of 7% (the study states that "Austria, Finland, Denmark, Estonia and Lithuania report almost exclusively female sex workers, while Poland reports that 15% of its sex worker population is male").

=== Underage sex work ===
A 2009 news report suggested that this is increasing according to Poland's Children Ombudsman's Office.

== Sex trafficking ==
Poland is a source, transit, and destination country for women and children subjected to sex trafficking. Women and children from Poland are subjected to sex trafficking within the country and also in other European countries. Women and children from Eastern Europe, particularly Bulgaria, Romania, and Ukraine, are subjected to sex trafficking in Poland.

According to CATW, an anti-trafficking activist group, human trafficking is a problem in Poland, citing the Polish Deputy Interior Minister. They state that Poland is a destination country for women trafficked from Bulgaria and a transit country for women from Ukraine, Lithuania and Belarus.

The US Trafficking in Persons Report 2010 states that "during the reporting period, the government identified at least 206 victims of trafficking – including 123 children in prostitution – compared with 315 victims identified by NGOs and government authorities in 2008". In 2016, The National Intervention-Consultation Center for Victims of Trafficking (KCIK) provided assistance to 55 potential victims of sexual exploitation.

The United States Department of State Office to Monitor and Combat Trafficking in Persons ranks Poland as a 'Tier 1' country.

== See also ==
- Women in Poland

== Sources ==
- Mariusz Jędrzejko: Prostytucja jako problem społeczny, moralny i zdrowotny. Pułtusk-Warszawa: Akademia Humanistyczna im. Aleksandra Gieysztora, Oficyna wydawnicza ASPRA-JR, 2006, ss. 38–40. (Prostitution as a social, moral, and health problem).
- Emil W. Pływaczewski. The Phenomenon of Prostitution in Poland: Around the Problem of Legalization. In: Przemysław Piotrowski ed., Understanding problems of social pathology. 49-60 Rodopi, Amsterdam 2006. ISBN 90-420-2025-3
- Emil Pływaczewski. The Phenomenon of Prostitution in Poland (Around the Problem of Legalization) Australian and New Zealand Society of Criminology conference Sept 2007 p 93
- Violetta Będkowska-Heine and Marek Heine. Some Conditions and Effects of Prostitution.
