= Women in Poland =

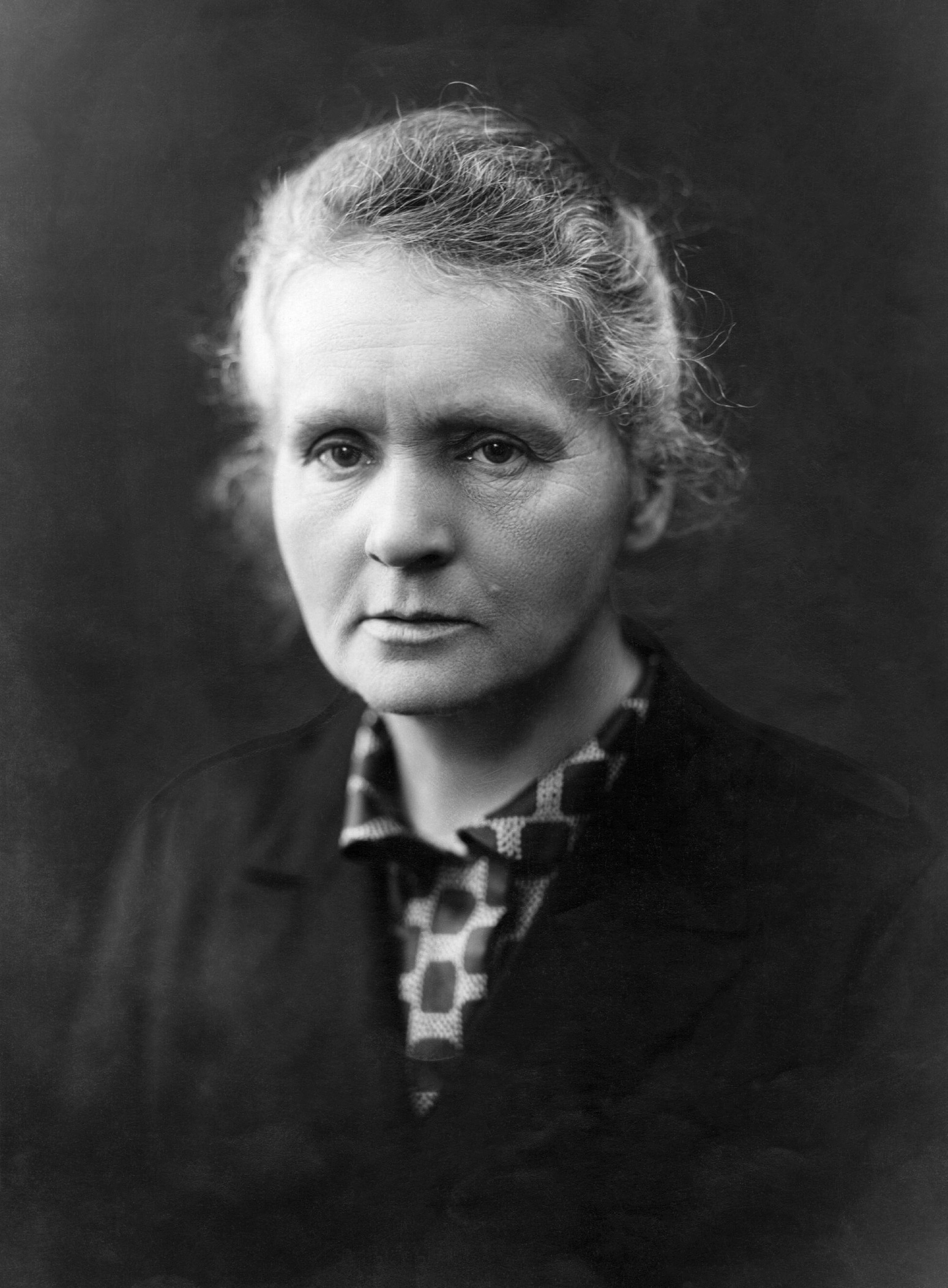
- Polish woman Maria Skłodowska Curie, Nobel Prize Winner

General statistics
- Maternal mortality (per 100,000): 2 (2020)
- Women in parliament: 29% (2023)
- Women over 25 with secondary education: 79.4% (2012)
- Women in labour force: 61.1% (employment rate OECD definition, 2019)

Gender Inequality Index
- Value: 0.109 (2021)
- Rank: 31st out of 191

Global Gender Gap Index
- Value: 0.709 (2022)
- Rank: 77th out of 146

The character of Polish women is shaped by Poland's history, culture, and politics. Poland has a long history of feminist activism, and was one of the first nations in Europe to enact women's suffrage. It is also strongly influenced by the conservative social views of the Catholic Church.

== History ==
The gender pay gap in average gross hourly earnings in EU member states, according to Eurostat 2014. Poland has one of the lowest gender pay gaps in the EU.

The history of women on the territory of present-day Poland has many roots, and has been strongly influenced by Roman Catholicism in Poland.

Poland was among the first nations to grant women legal rights: women's suffrage was enacted in 1918 after the country regained independence that year, following the foreign partitions of Poland, which resulted in the elimination of the sovereign Polish state for 123 years. In 1932 Poland made marital rape illegal. Despite the improvement of the state's policies regarding women's rights, Polish women still faced discrimination on various levels. The concept of the "glass ceiling" in Polish society was formed during the interwar period. Women had to compete with men for well-paid, high-prestige positions but their salaries remained lower than men in almost all sectors.

During the Communist era, women were ostensibly granted equal legal rights, and the official government rhetoric was one of supporting gender equality, as in other communist states. Women saw significant gains under the communist régime, such as better access to education and more equal involvement in the workforce. The improvement to women's conditions during the Communist era was significantly influenced by the socialist pro-birth position, seeking an increase in the population. Pro-natalist policies were implemented by "generous maternity leave benefits and state contributions to child rearing". After martial law was enacted in Poland in 1981 to 1983, the first publications discussing feminist ideas appeared in the public sphere. At the time, feminism was often perceived as an ideology alien to the Polish culture and mentality. Communist leaders claimed that women in Poland obtained equal rights as a result of socialistic social processes, and used that statement to explain why there was a lack of – and no need for – feminism in Poland.

The fall of communism in Poland meant the shaking up of the country's politics and economy, as well as initial economic and social destabilization. In the post-socialist workforce, women occupied mainly sectors of lower economic priority and light industry, due to factors such as selecting for types of education and training more compatible with family life (usually paid less), discrimination and gender stereotypes. This pattern of gender employment inequality was viewed by the majority as the result of women's primary role in the family, as well as deeply rooted Polish culture and the tradition of the patriarchal system. The transition period was especially difficult for women, although men were also negatively affected. As of 2017, the employment rate for women aged 20–64 was 63.6%, compared to men's rate of 78.2%.

Poland maintains high numbers of professional women and women in business, and it also has one of the lowest gender pay gaps in the European Union. However, the status of women in contemporary Poland must be understood in the context of the political scene and of the role that the Roman Catholic church plays in society. This is especially true with regard to reproductive rights. In 2020 Poland's constitutional court ruled that abortion due to fetal defects was unconstitutional.Anti-abortion legislation passed in 2021 deemed abortion to be legal only in cases where a woman's life or health of the woman is endangered by the pregnancy, or when the pregnancy is a result of a criminal act, such as rape.

The cultural symbol of the "Polish Mother" — a stereotype shaped by the country's turbulent history of the nation and cemented in the Polish consciousness — strongly encourages women to have many children and reinforces the concept that women's place is in the home.

Poland has been part of the European Union (EU) since 2004. As such, it is subject to EU directives. As part of the EU, Poland is socially influenced by 'Western' views, but there are regional differences between the western and the eastern parts of the country – "Poland A and B". Poland also has a significant rural population: about 40%, which is deeply conservative.

== Old Polish customs ==
Old Polish customs varied based on social status. Polish customs derived from other European traditions, however, typically came to Poland later than in other countries. The example of chivalry illustrates the approach of the medieval class towards women. The concept of chivalry was based on the almost divine worship of the female, and every knight had to have his "lady" (dama) as the object of (very often platonic) love. Knights felt obligated to take a patronage over their ladies. Women in Poland were historically perceived as the soul of the company during social gatherings. Women traditionally held a preeminent social position. Referring to girls as panny ('ladies'), which derives from the Polish word pan ('sir') unlike chłopcy ('boys'), which comes from the word chłop ('peasant') is a sign of respect shown towards women. Long before the emancipation movement, women in Poland had an important social role mainly due to the numerous conflicts and threats that kept men away from home. The political and economic situation required women to become self-sufficient and courageous. Polish women's clothing was also quite different in the past. Mid-16th century apparel contained a variety of types of decorations and accessories. Women's headwear included decorative wreaths, veils, and various hatbands. Among the notable elements of women's clothing of the time were "long, satin dresses" decorated with gold and pearls, as well as "aureate slippers".

== Women in sports ==
Polish women have earned a special place in the country's sports. As of 2023, the top three places for the most wins in the annual most popular sportsperson contest, the Plebiscite of Przegląd Sportowy, are occupied by women. Among the most prominent Polish women athletes are Justyna Kowalczyk (won the title five times in a row), Irena Szewińska (three times in a row) and Stanisława Walasiewicz (three times in a row, four times total). Iga Świątek was voted the Polish Sports Personality of the Year in 2023. In the 2016 Rio Summer Olympics Poland was represented by 101 women athletes. They won eight out of eleven medals in which Poland was competitive, including two gold medals.

== Notable women ==
• Dobrawa of Bohemia (wife of Mieszko I; c. 940-977), Duchess of the Polans

• Swietoslava (sometimes confused for Sigrid the Haughty or Gunhilda; also known as Storrada; c. 1046-1126), the daughter of Mieszko the First and Dobrawa of Bohemia

• Queen Jadwiga (Hedwig; 1373-1399), Queen of the Kingdom of Poland

• Barbara Radziwiłł (1520-1551), Queen of Poland and Grand Duchess of Lithuania

• Katarzyna Jagiellonka (also known as Catherine Jagiello or Katarrina Jegellonica; 1526-1583), Queen of Sweden

• Marie Leszczyńska (1703-1768), Polish-born princess and longest serving queen of France

• Barbara Sanguszko (1718-1791), hostess, writer and philanthropist

• Tekla Teresa Lubienska (1767-1810; granddaughter of Barbara Sanguszko), writer and mother of a magnate dynasty

• Maria Szymanowska (1789-1831), composer and pianist

• Klementyna Hoffmanowa (1798-1845), novelist, playwright and activist

• Emilia Plater (1806-1831), early revolutionary associated with the November Uprising

• Eliza Orzeszkowa (1841-1910), novelist

• Maria Konopnicka (1842-1910), poet

• Anna Bilińska (1854-1893), widely considered the first internationally known Polish woman artist

• Gabriela Zapolska (1857-1921), novelist, playwright, critic and actress

• Olga Boznańska (1865-1940), painter associated with impressionism

• Marie Sklodowska (better known as Marie Curie; 1867-1934), Nobel Prize-winning scientist

• Rosa Luxemburg (1871-1919), Marxist theorist and revolutionary

• Helena Rubinstein (1972-1965), entrepreneur and philathropist

• Zofia Nałkowska (1884-1954), dramatist, essayist and politician

• Aleksandra Zagórska (1884-1965), activist and military officer

• Maria Dąbrowska (1889-1965), writer, novelist, dramatist, journalist

• Maria Pawlikowska-Jasnorzewska (1891-1945), poet

• Zofia Stryjeńska (1891-1976), painter, graphic designer, stage designer, illustrator

• Tamara de Lempicka (1894-1980), Art Deco artist

• Wanda Gertz (1896-1958), officer who presented as a man to serve in the Polish military, later activist for women in the military

• Pola Negri (1897-1987), early film screen icon

• Irena Krzywicka (1899-1994), feminist writer and activist

• Krystyna Skarbek (1908-1952), World War II secret agent

• Irena Sendler (1910-2008), humanitarian and resistance fighter

• Zuzanna Ginczanka (1917-1945), Polish-Jewish poet

• Wisława Szymborska (1923-2012), Polish poet and recipient of the Nobel Prize in 1996

• Alina Szapocznikow (1926-1973), sculptor

• Anna Walentynowicz (1929-2010), co-founder of the anti-communist Solidarity (Solidarność)

• Magdalena Abakanowicz (1930-2017), sculptor

• Hanna Suchocka (1946- ), Poland's first female prime minister

• Agnieszka Holland (1948- ), film director and screenwriter

• Olga Tokarczuk (1962- ), author, activist and Nobel laureate in Literature

• Joanna Kulig (1982- ), actress and singer

• Justyna Kowalczyk-Tekieli (1983- ), Olympic champion cross-country skier

• Anja Rubik (1983- ), supermodel and sex education activist

• Monika Silva Koniuszek (1984-2026), anti-corruption activist

• Margaret (1991- ), singer/songwriter

• Iga Świątek (2001- ), tennis player

== Gallery ==
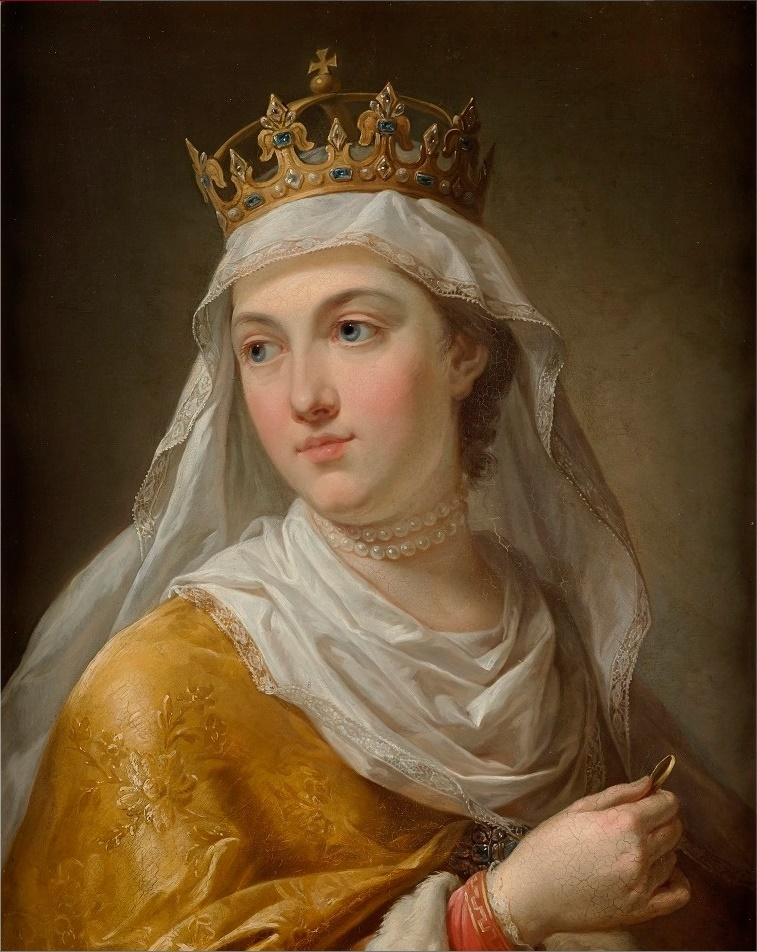
Jadwiga of Poland, Queen of Poland

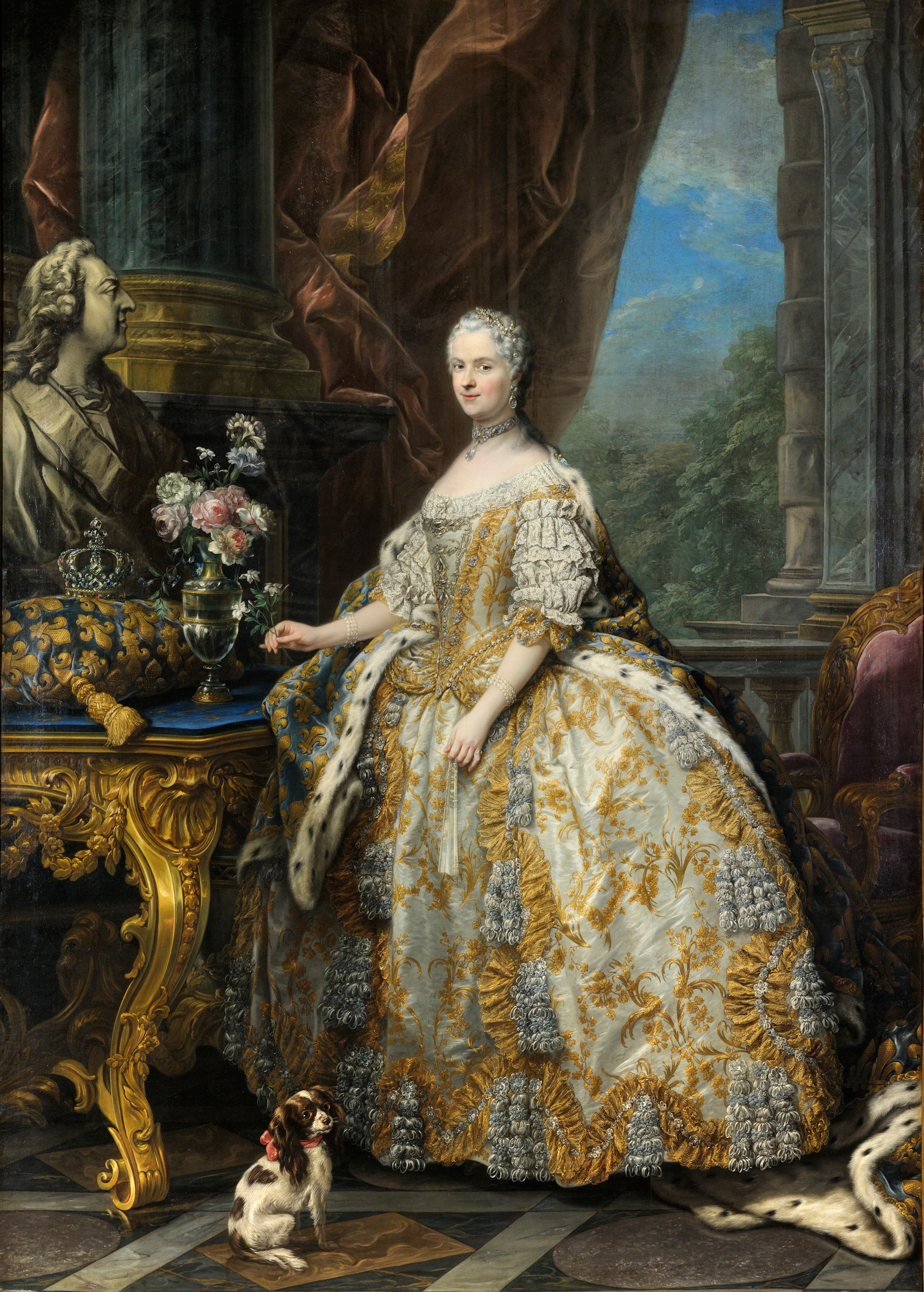
Marie Leszczyńska, the longest-serving Queen of France

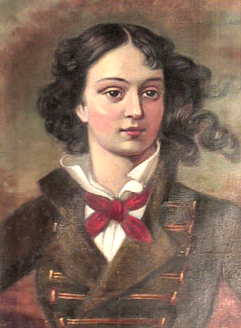
Emilia Plater, revolutionary

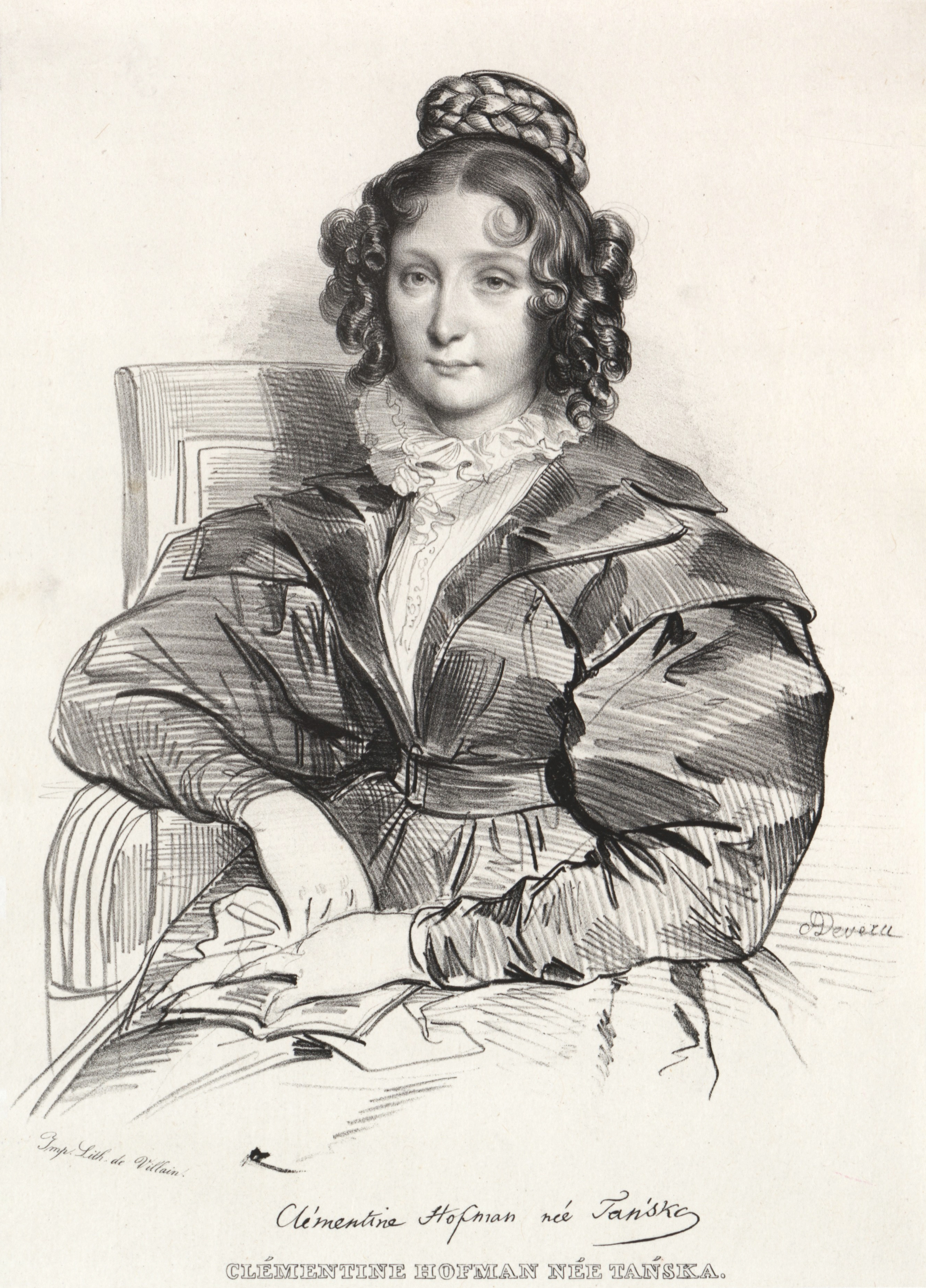
Klementyna Hoffmanowa, novelist, playwright and activist

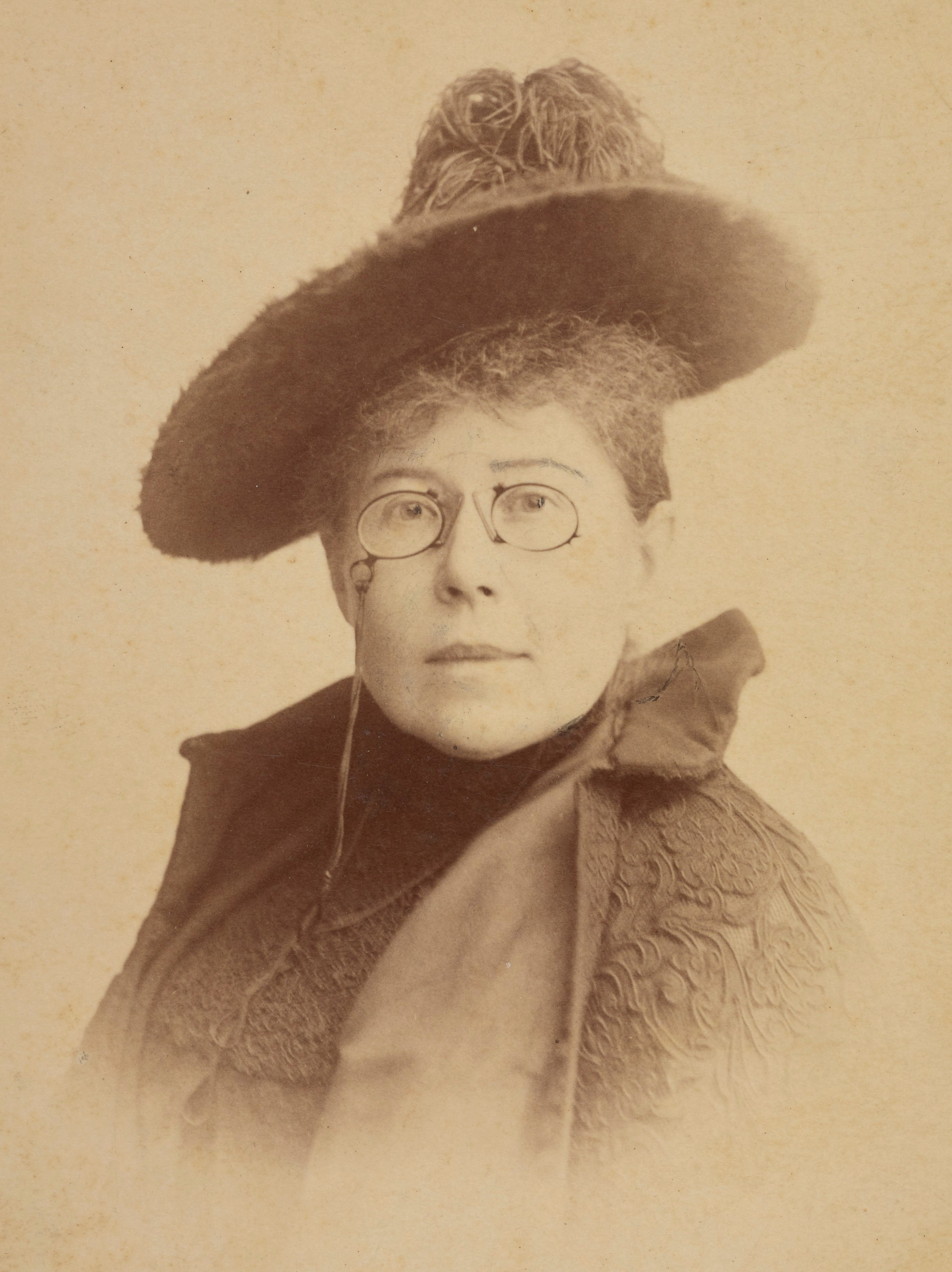
Maria Konopnicka, writer and women's rights activist

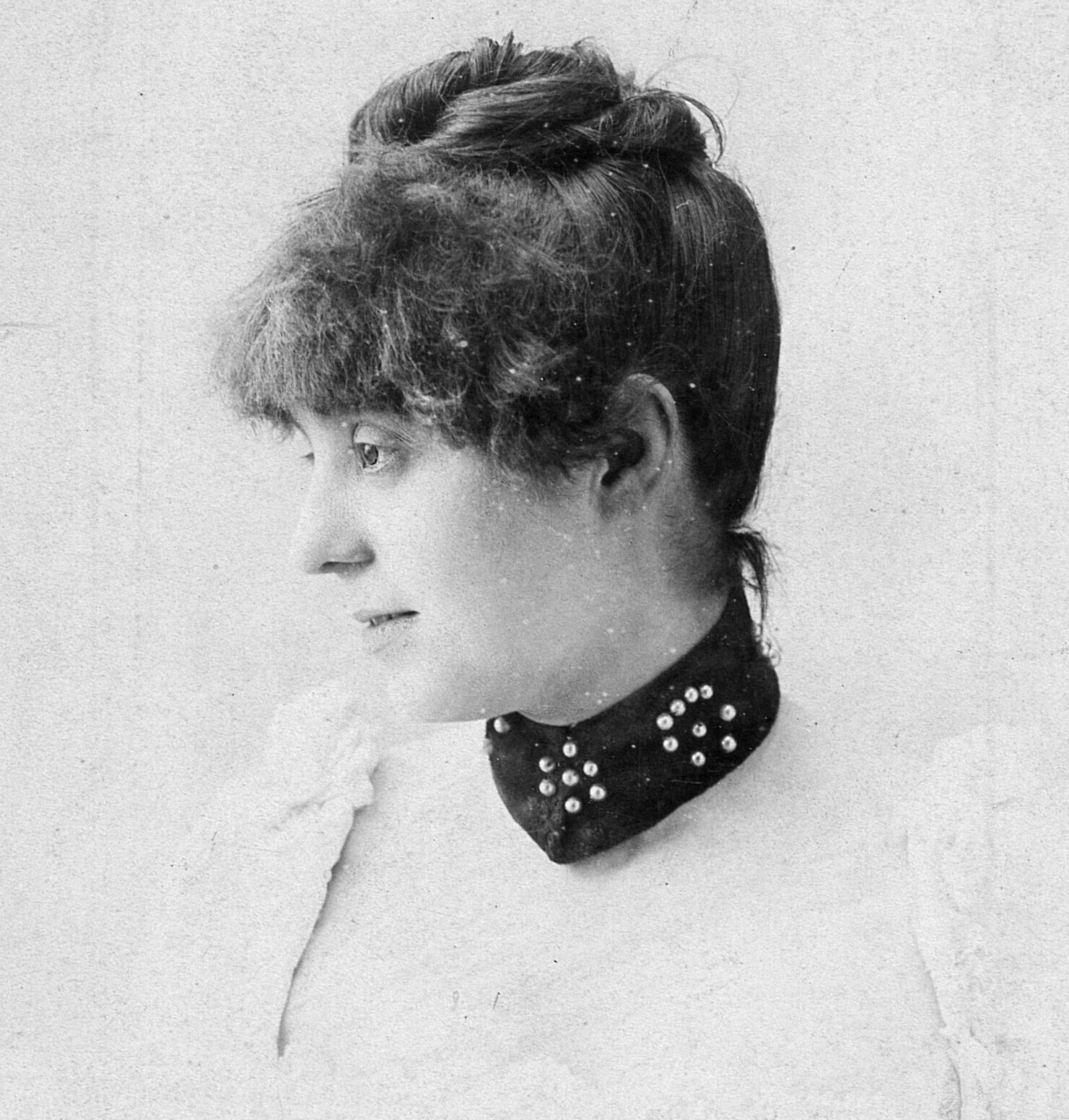
Gabriela Zapolska, playwright

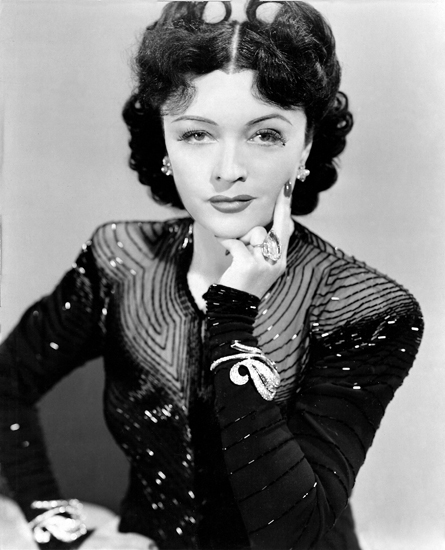
Pola Negri, icon of the golden eras of Hollywood and European film

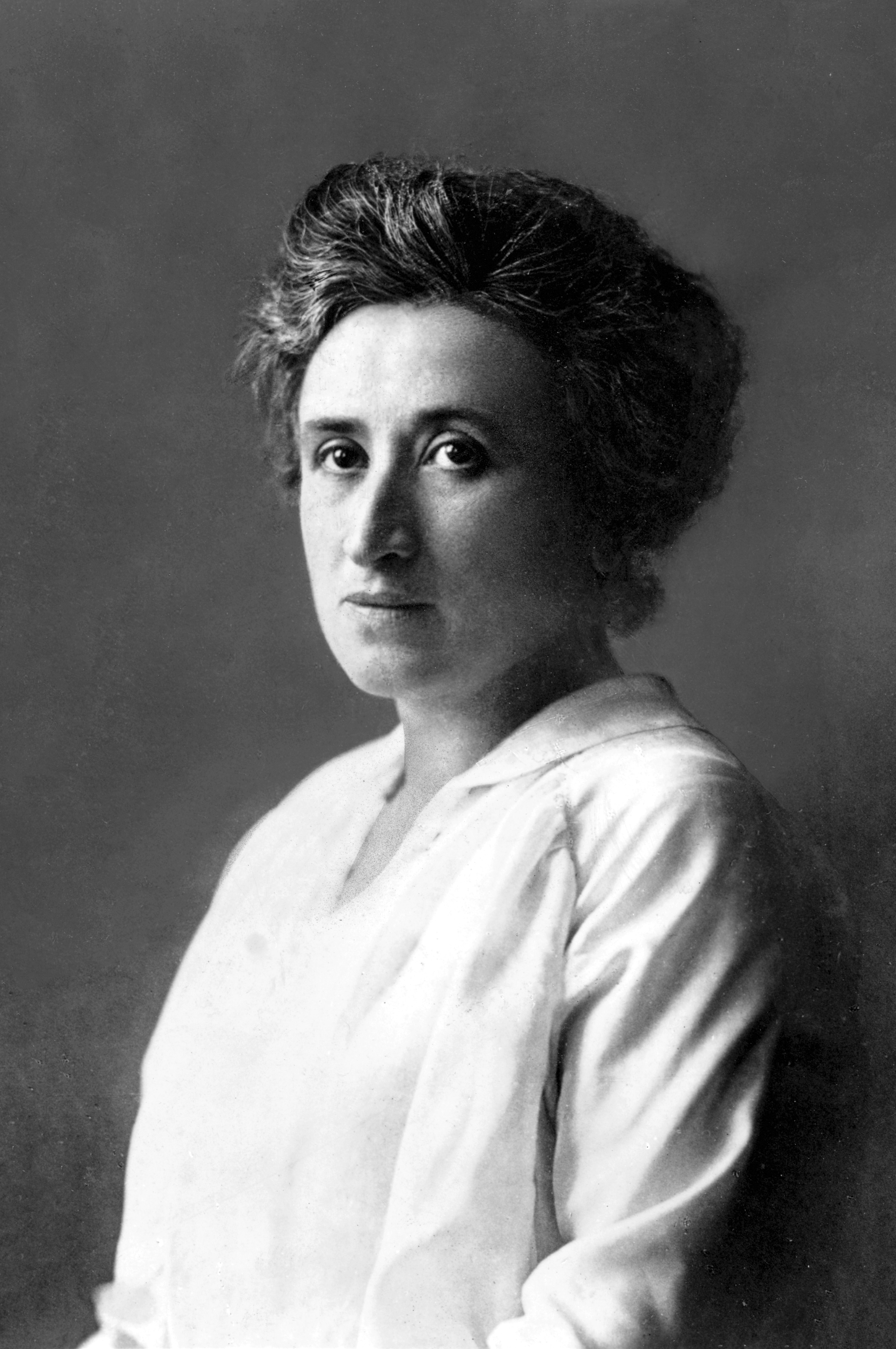
Rosa Luxemburg, socialist activist

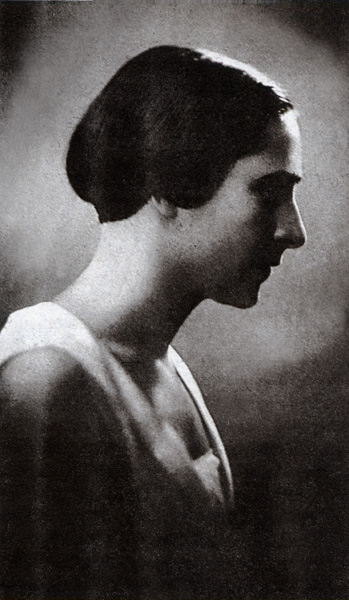
Irena Krzywicka, feminist

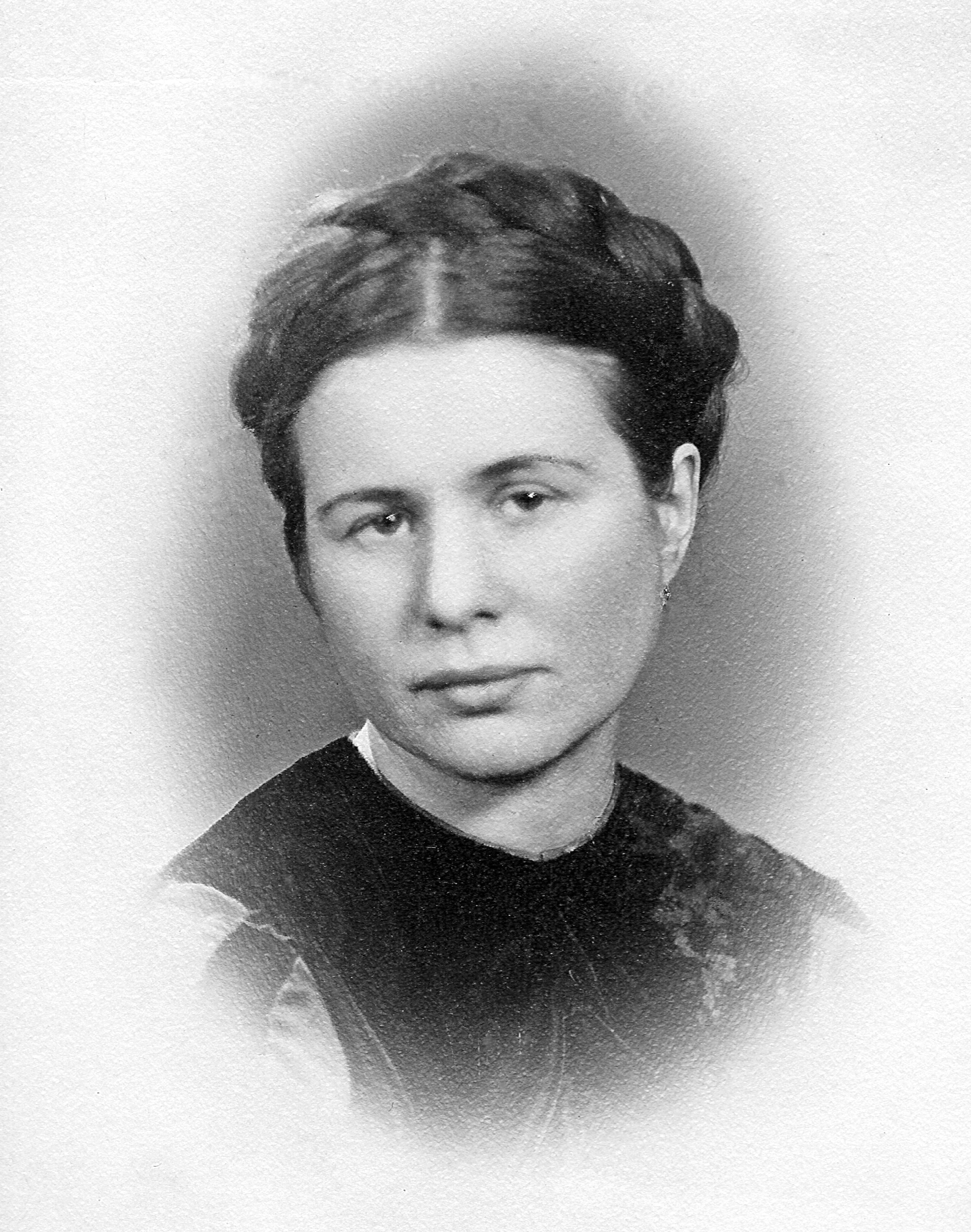
Irena Sendler, World War II hero

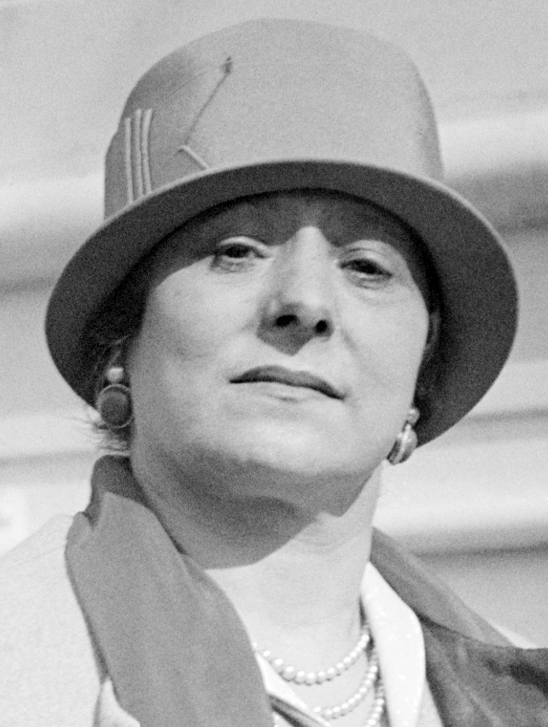
Helena Rubinstein, entrepreneur

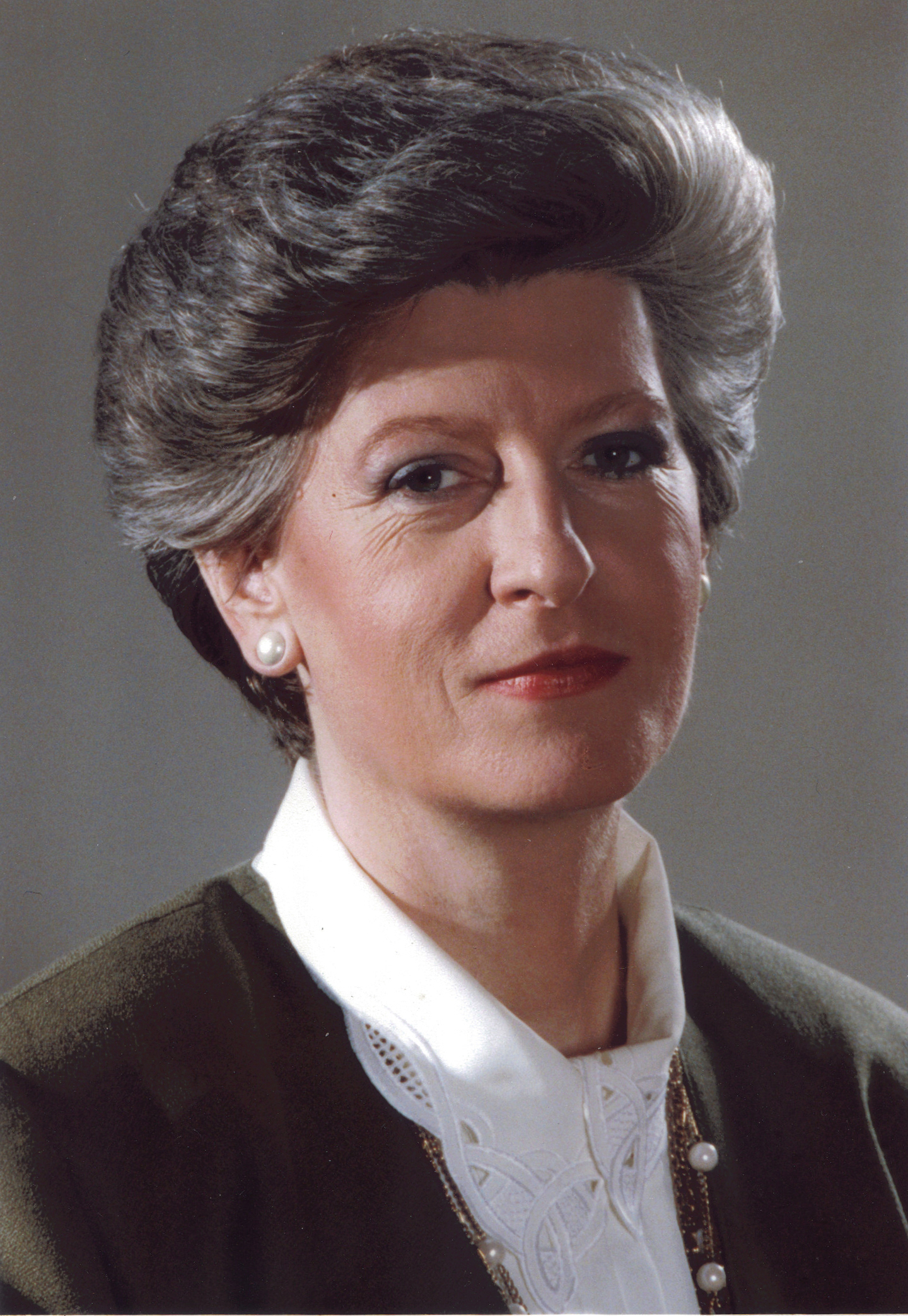
Hanna Suchocka, Poland's first female prime minister

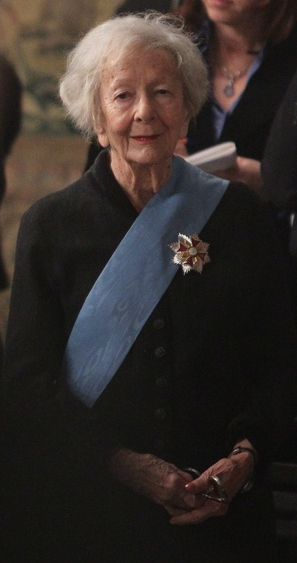
Wisława Szymborska, Nobel Prize laureate

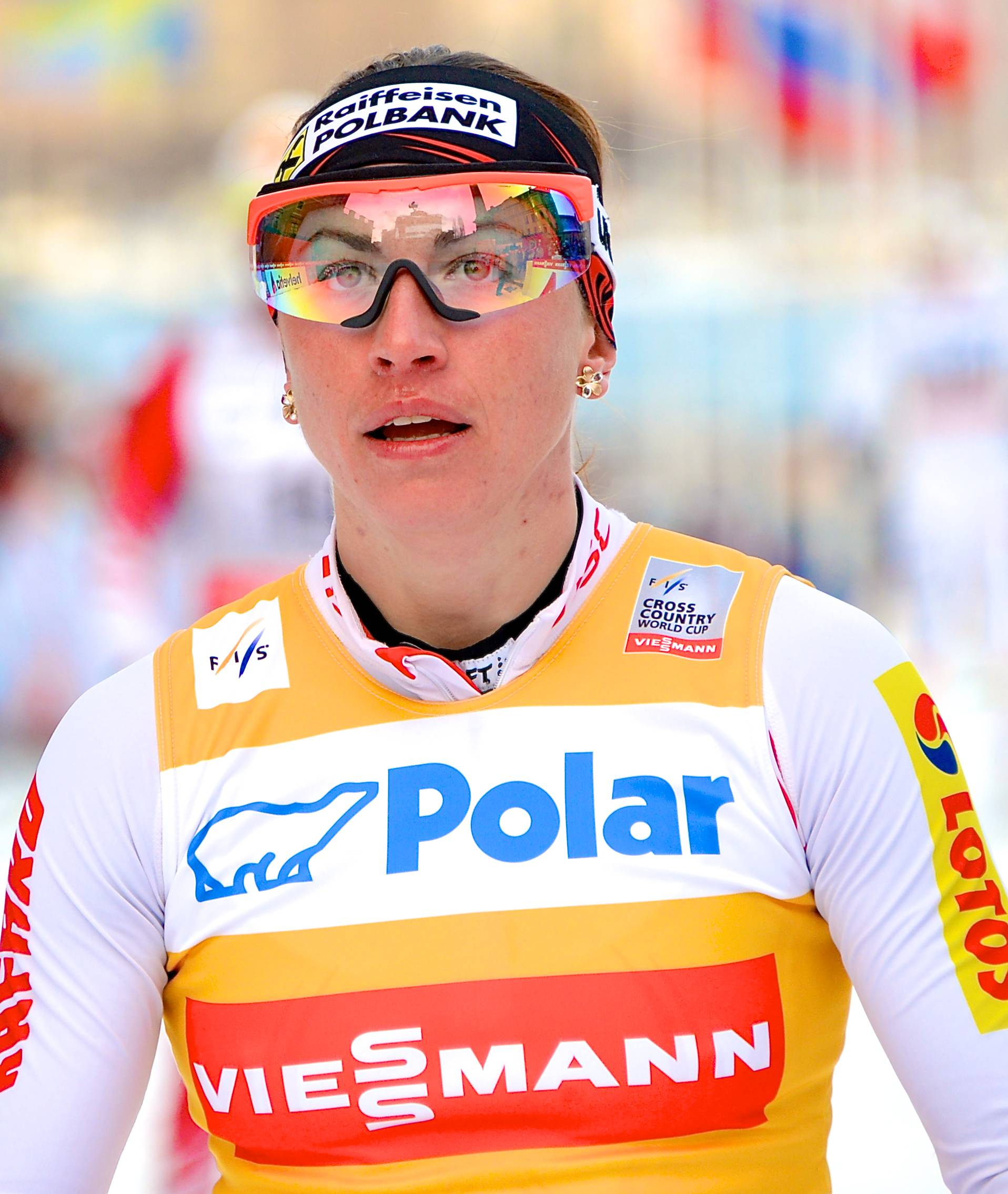
Justyna Kowalczyk, Olympic champion

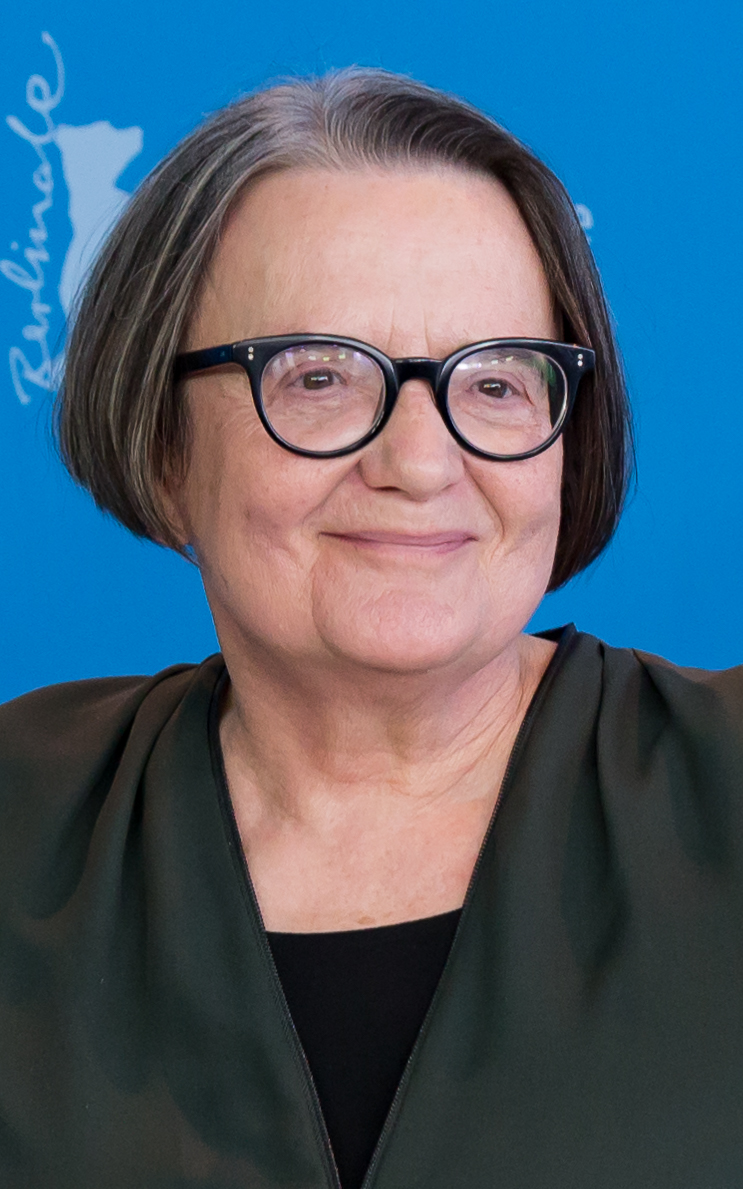
Agnieszka Holland, film director

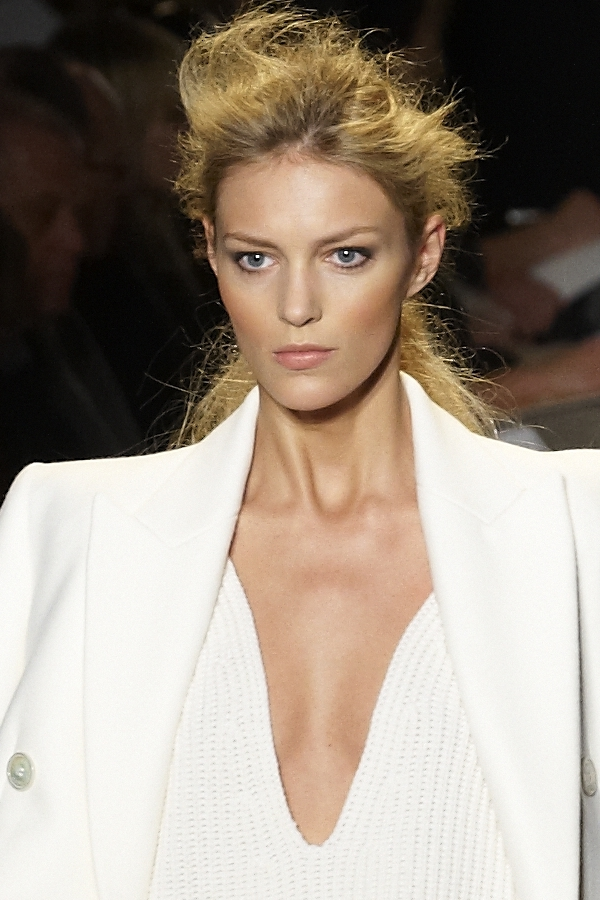
Anja Rubik, model

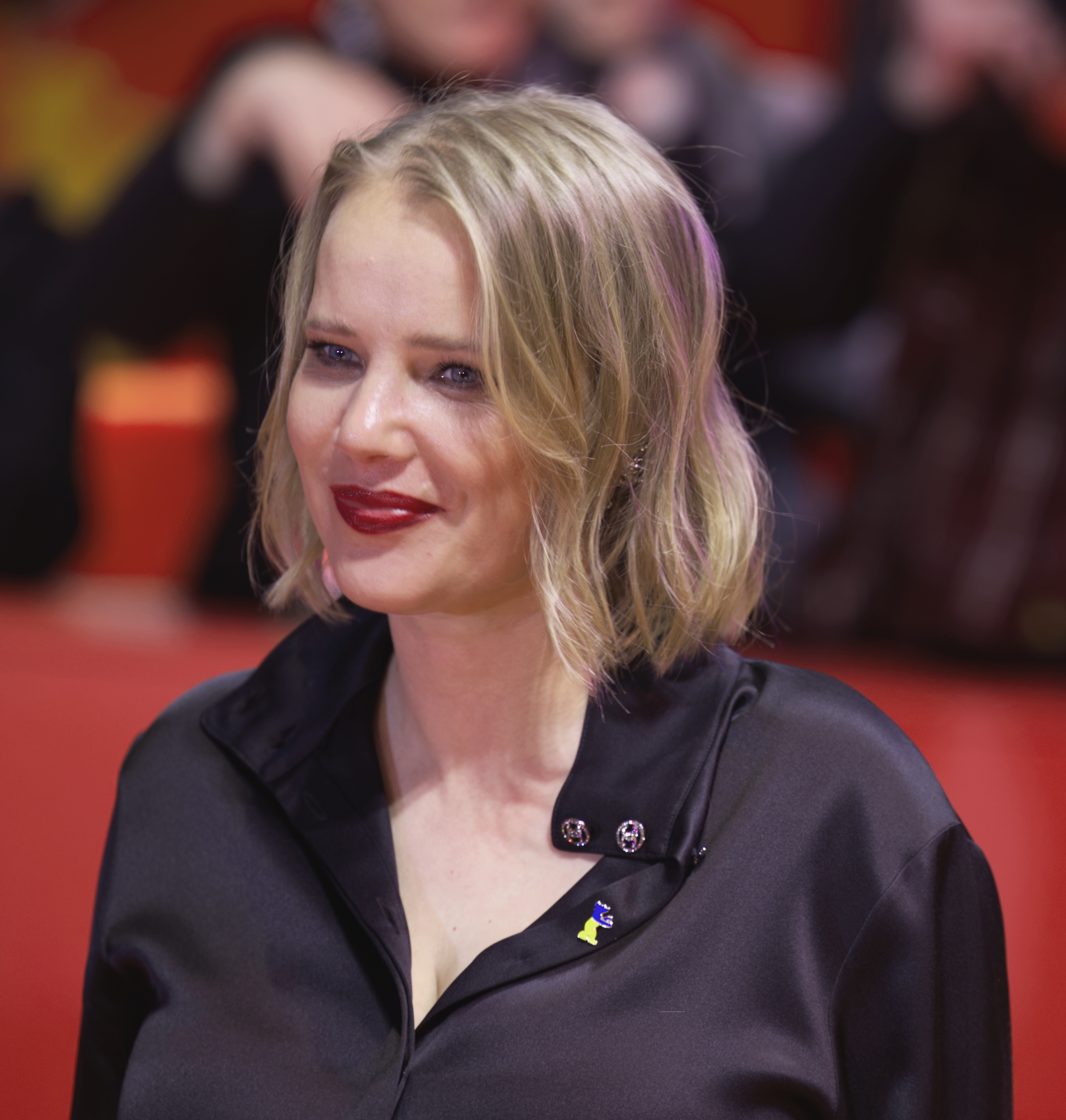
Joanna Kulig, actress

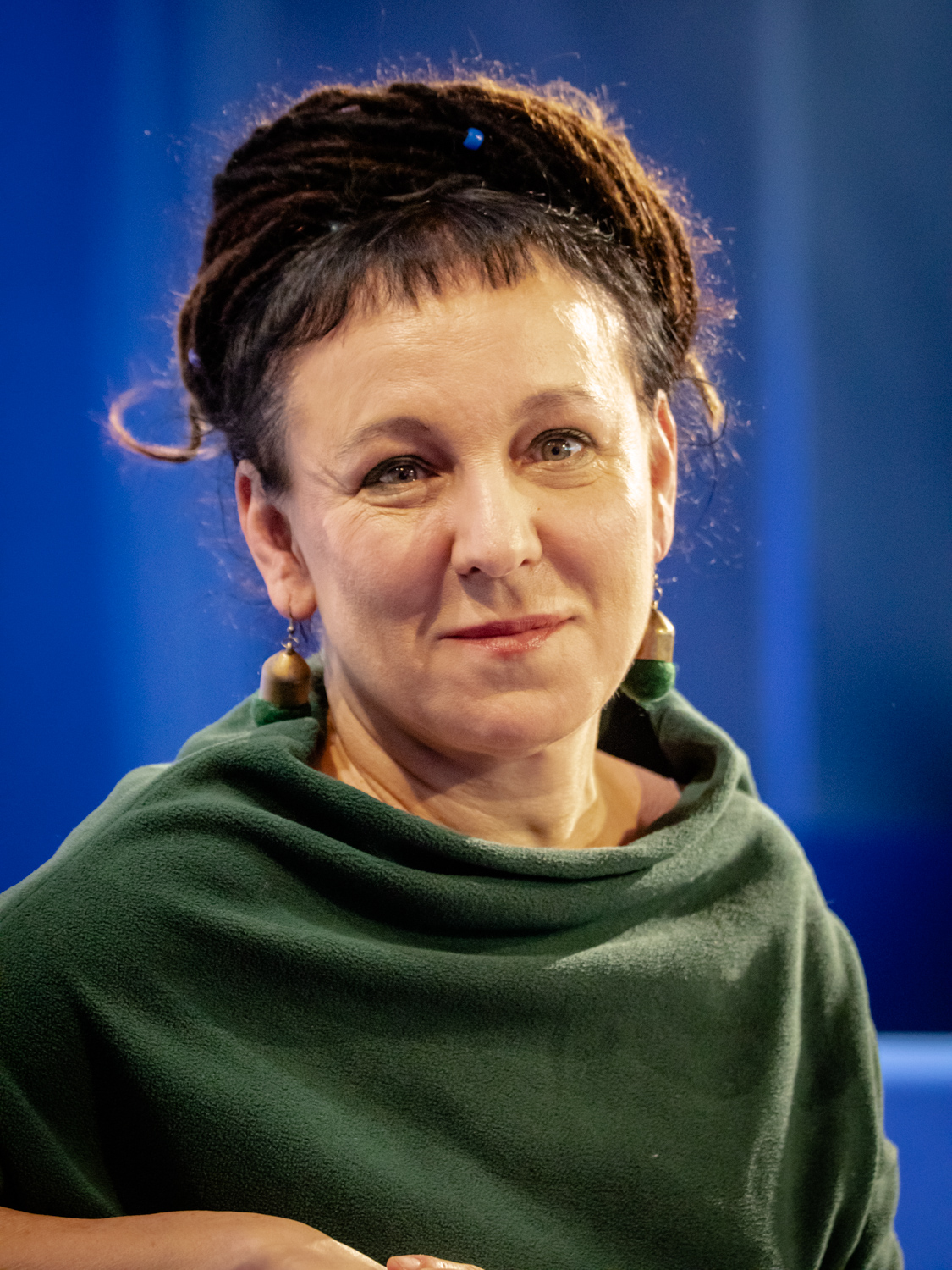
Olga Tokarczuk, Nobel Prize laureate

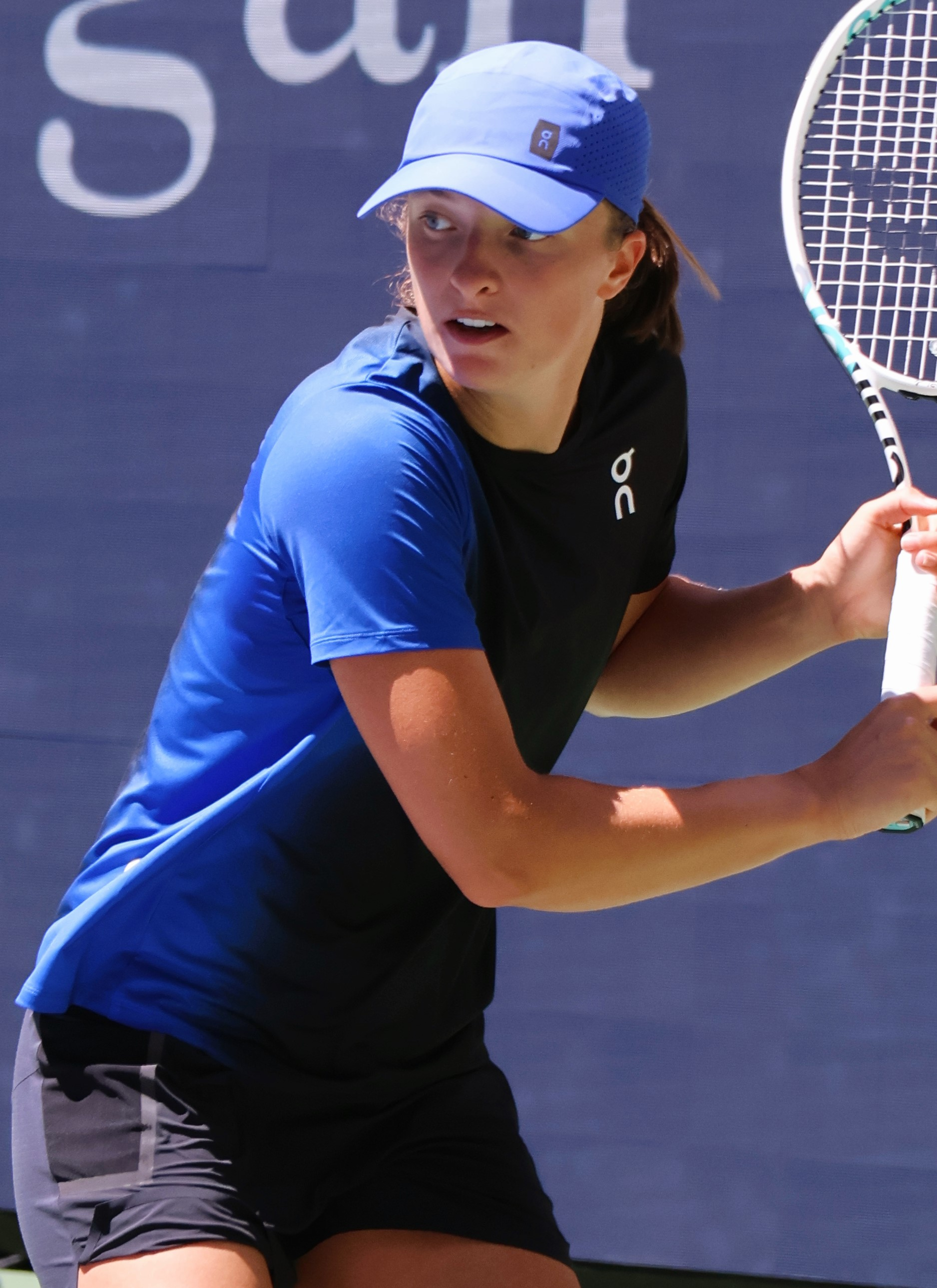
Iga Świątek, tennis player

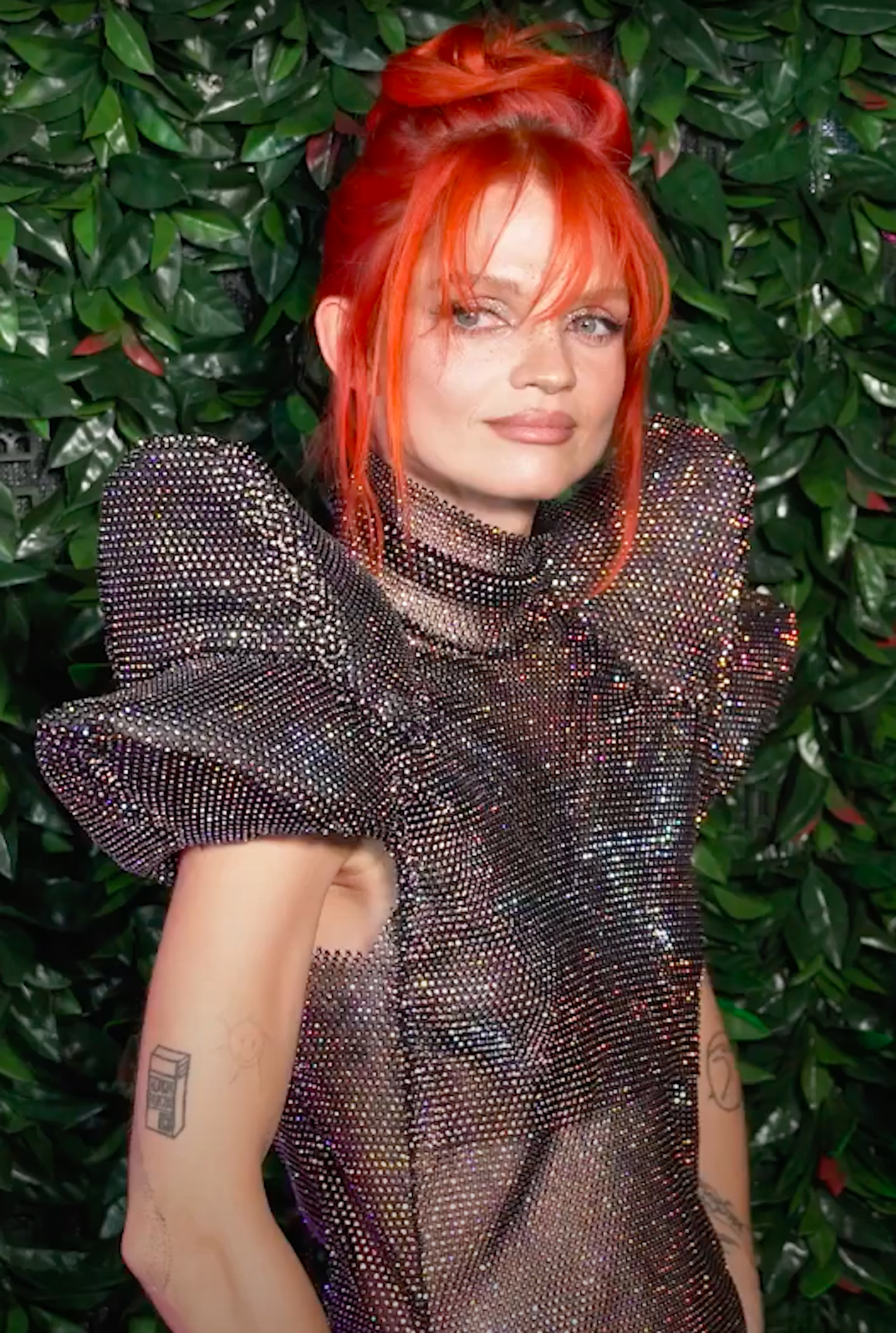
Margaret, singer

== See also ==
- Prostitution in Poland
- Gender roles in post-communist Central and Eastern Europe
- Women in Europe
- Women in the Polish Army
