= Karoly Hokky =

Hungarian-American politician and educator

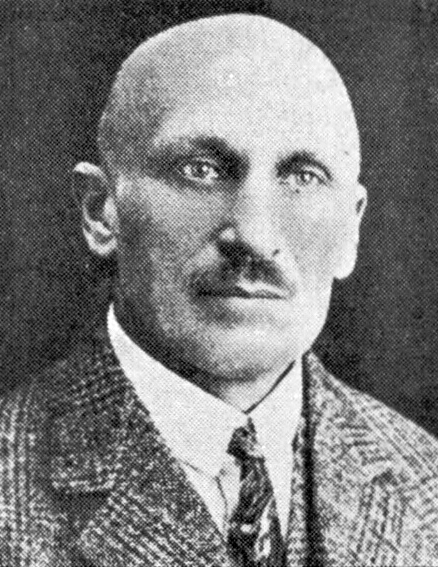
Karoly Hokky

Karoly Hokky (Hungarian: Károly Hokky, also known as Charles J. Hokky in the later part of his life; 31 January 1883 – 16 January 1971) was a Hungarian politician and educator. Due to changing political circumstances, he could be defined early on as being a Hungarian, then as an ethnic Hungarian in Czechoslovakia, and later as a Hungarian-American; throughout the transitions though he kept a strong Hungarian political and cultural identity.

== Early life and education ==
Hokky was born in Szepsi in the Abaúj-Torna County of the Kingdom of Hungary (present-day Moldava nad Bodvou in Slovakia).

He attended both Budapest University and Kolozsvár University (now Babeş-Bolyai University at Cluj-Napoca, Romania).

He was a school teacher in Budapest and later in Kassa (today Košice).

== Military career ==
With the outbreak of the First World War, he was drafted and served as an infantry officer in the 34th Reserve on the Russian Front. After being wounded, he was assigned to non-combat duties.

After the war he returned to Košice, but after the Czechoslovak Legions took over the city in 1919 he, like other Hungarian teachers, was dismissed from work. His writings about this period, even after many decades, show considerable bitterness towards the Czechoslovaks.

== Political career ==
In 1921 he had a major role in founding the Christian Social Party of Carpathian Ruthenia and became its Secretary General.

In 1928 he was elected as a Representative, and one year later as member of the National Assembly in Prague. In 1935 he was elected as a Czechoslovak Senator for a term which was to last until 1939. However, with the First Vienna Award he was deprived of his mandate, as his constituency was no longer part of Czechoslovakia.

After the Hungarian army occupied Carpathian Ruthenia, the newly created Hungarian National Council invited him to serve as Member of Hungarian Parliament instead.

On 1944 he fled before the advancing Soviet troops, as did many ethnic Hungarians in Carpathian Ruthenia.

Eventually he reached the United States, where he spent the rest of his life, involved in Hungarian anti-Communist emigre circles.

== Archive ==
Hokky's papers in Hungarian and English for the 1954–1970 period, including correspondence (especially with Maria Ugron Podhorszky) and writings are deposited in the Hungarian American Collection, Immigration History Research Center, University of Minnesota () (note: biography on this site wrongly attributes his military service to World War II rather than World War I).
