= Szepsi Csombor Márton High School =

Secondary school in Hungary

Information
- Established: 1526; 500 years ago

Szepsi Csombor Márton High School is located in Szikszó, the North-Eastern part of Hungary. Named after Márton Szepsi Csombor, it is a standard school that consists of two main institutions: elementary school and high school. Szepsi Csombor Márton High School also functions as a Training School, Library, Combined Pedagogical Service and Elementary School.

== History ==
=== Beginnings ===
The high school was established as a part of the Parish School of Sárospatak in the 1520s. From 1526, the first teacher was György Baccalaureus and after him came András Batizi. From 1538, István Székely Benczédi's and from 1540 Mátyás Bíró Dévai's names were remarkable in the school's history. The school fulfilled a secondary school function from the beginning. Szikszó developed a good relationship with the Boarding School of Debrecen, from where several rectors were invited and also followed the Boarding School of Debrecen's educational schedule.

=== 19th century ===
In the 19th century it was hard to decide what type of school Szikszó should have. For a long time, it functioned as a sub-level secondary school, but since it couldn't fulfill the requirements for remaining a secondary school, by 1870 it had been relegated to an elementary school.

=== 20th century ===
In 1928, the city reopened the secondary school which functioned between the two World Wars. In 1949, the building of the elementary school was built and took up the name of Móricz Zsigmond Elementary School. Szikszó got its high school back in 1964 which became independent from the elementary school and took up the name of the traveler and author Szepsi Csombor Márton in 1969. In 1995 the Local Government of Szikszó decided to combine the two educational institutions. Today under the name of Szepsi Csombor Márton High School we mean the elementary school, a training school, the city library as well as an elementary art school.

== Elementary school ==
The elementary school has 8 classes and for lower classes a day-board school is provided. In the 1st grade till the 8th an advance P.E. training is optional. In the 3rd year, students can decide to study a foreign language in an advanced level (English, German) which lasts till the 6th year of elementary school. From the 6th grade, students can start their high school studies in a 6-graded form whereas they can continue their advanced language classes. In the 5th grade advanced mathematics is also serves as an option for elementary school students.

== High school ==
In each year two types of classes are present within the high school. The first one is the advanced 6-year training and the other is a standard 4-year training for students. From 2004, if the students and parents require also a 0. year is introduced for students in the 6-year form training, which focuses on IT skills and Language skills.

== Training School ==
13th and 14th grade is optional for those students who wish to learn further and get an OKJ qualification.

== Elementary Art School ==
- Music
- Dance
- Fine Arts
