= Moldava nad Bodvou =

Moldava nad Bodvou Szepsi
- Town
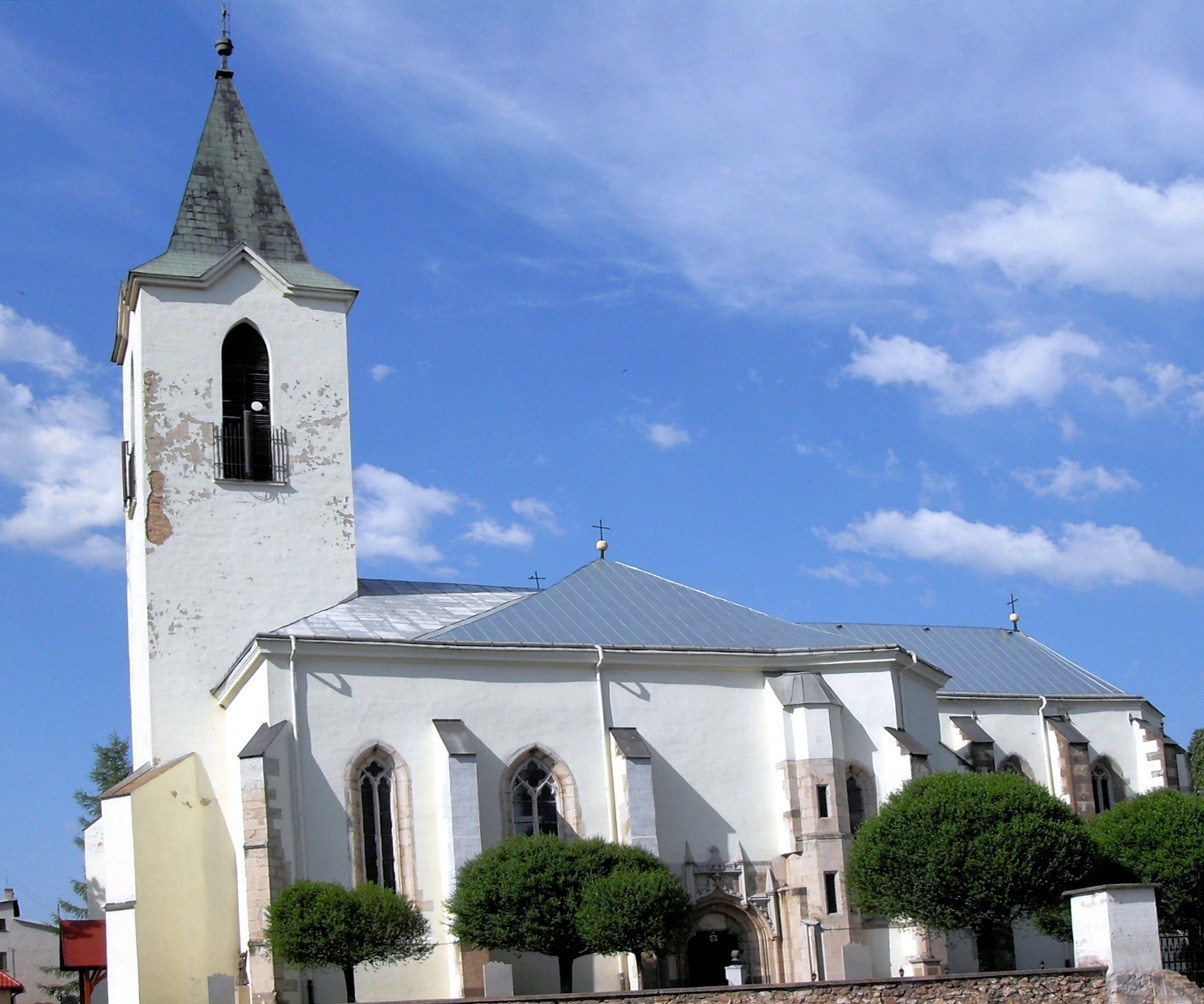
- Church of the Holy Spirit

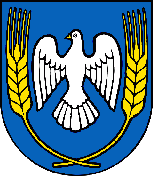
- Flag Coat of arms

- Location in Slovakia Location in Košice Region
- Coordinates: 48°36′23″N 21°00′01″E
- Country: Slovakia
- Region: Košice
- District: Košice-okolie
- First mentioned: 1255

Government
  - Mayor: Slavomír Borovský

Area
  - Total: 19.76 km^{2} (7.63 sq mi)
- Elevation: 206 m (676 ft)

Population (2025)
  - Total: 10,284
- Time zone: UTC+1 (CET)
  - Summer (DST): UTC+2 (CEST)
- Postal code: 045 01
- Area code: +421 55
- Vehicle registration plate (until 2022): KS
- Website: www.moldava.sk

Moldava nad Bodvou (Hungarian: Szepsi; German: Moldau (an der Bodwa); Yiddish מילדוי / סעפשי) is a town in Košice-okolie District in the Košice Region of eastern Slovakia.

== History ==
In historical records the town was first mentioned in 1255.

== Geography ==
The municipality lies at an altitude of 206 metres (676 ft) and covers an area of 19.76 km^{2} (7.63 sq mi) (2025).

== Population ==
Historical population
Year	Pop.	±%
1970	5,719	—
1980	6,858	+19.9%
1991	8,796	+28.3%
2001	9,525	+8.3%
2011	11,068	+16.2%
2021	10,305	−6.9%
Source: Censuses

Population statistic (10 years)
Year	1995	2005	2015	2025
Count	9377	9899	11,260	10,284
Difference		+5.56%	+13.74%	−8.66%

Population statistic
Year	2024	2025
Count	10,275	10,284
Difference		+0.08%

It has a population of 10,284 people (31 December 2025).

=== Ethnicity ===
Census 2021 (1+ %)
Ethnicity	Number	Fraction
Slovak	5591	54.25%
Hungarian	3424	33.22%
Romani	2015	19.55%
Not found out	473	4.59%
Total	10,305	

In year 2021 was 10,305 people by ethnicity 5591 as Slovak, 3424 as Hungarian, 2015 as Romani, 473 as Not found out, 46 as Czech, 44 as Rusyn, 23 as German, 21 as Ukrainian, 14 as Russian, 14 as Other, 6 as Polish, 1 as Irish, 1 as Vietnamese, 1 as Austrian, 1 as Moravian, 1 as Canadian, 1 as Bulgarian and 1 as Albanian.

Note on population: The difference values of population numbers in the table "Population statistic" and in the sections "Ethnicity" & "Religion" is caused by the use of various statistical methods.

=== Religion ===
Census 2021 (1+ %)
Religion	Number	Fraction
Roman Catholic Church	6893	66.89%
None	1562	15.16%
Calvinist Church	770	7.47%
Not found out	438	4.25%
Greek Catholic Church	274	2.66%
Evangelical Church	160	1.55%
Total	10,305	

In year 2021 was 10,305 people by religion 6893 from Roman Catholic Church, 1562 from None, 770 from Calvinist Church, 438 from Not found out, 274 from Greek Catholic Church, 160 from Evangelical Church, 67 from Jehovah's Witnesses, 33 from Christian Congregations in Slovakia, 32 from Eastern Orthodox Church, 29 from Other, 11 from Apostolic Church, 7 from Ad hoc movements, 6 from Seventh-day Adventist Church, 5 from Buddhism, 4 from Other and not ascertained christian church, 4 from United Methodist Church, 3 from Islam, 2 from Paganism and natural spirituality, 2 from Hinduism, 1 from Old Catholic Church, 1 from Church of the Brethren and 1 from Church of Jesus Christ of Latter-day Saints.

== Economy ==
The town has a police force and fire service and its own tax office.

== Twin towns – sister cities ==
Moldava nad Bodvou is twinned with:

- Brzozów, Poland
- Cristuru Secuiesc, Romania
- Edelény, Hungary
- Encs, Hungary
- Karcag, Hungary
- Pestszentlőrinc-Pestszentimre, Hungary
- Siklós, Hungary
- Tarcal, Hungary
- Tišnov, Czech Republic

== Notable people ==
- Márton Szepsi Csombor (1595–1622), Hungarian pastor and travel writer
- Karoly Hokky (1883–1971), Hungarian politician and educator
- Max Eisen (1927–2022), author, public speaker and holocaust educator and survivor
