= Márton Szepsi Csombor =

Hungarian pastor and travel writer (1595–1622)

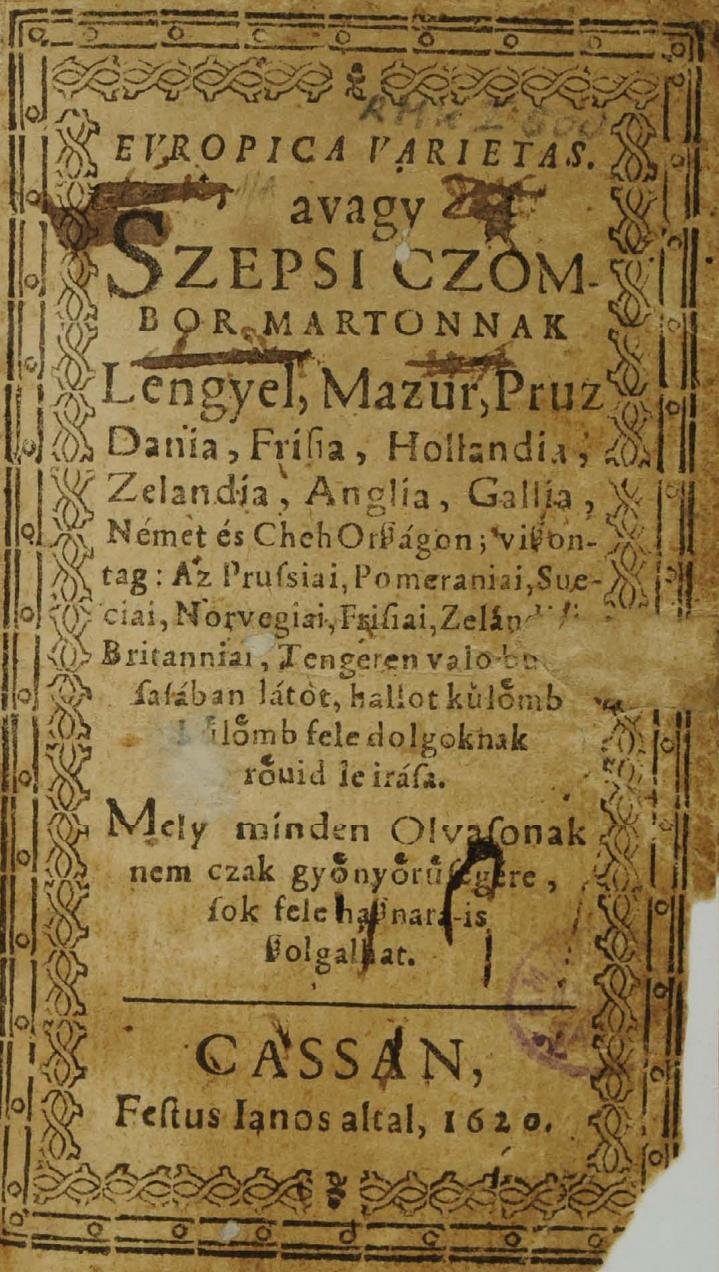
Title page of Europica Varietas

Márton Szepsi Csombor (Note: Also known as Latin: Martinus Szepsi Ungarus, "Martinus Czespi the Hungarian", in Latin) (Note: 'Csombor' is an officially recognized given name in Hungary. It is believed it comes from the plant name 'csombor', Satureja hortensis.)(1595–1622) was a Hungarian Protestant pastor and traveler, and the author of the first Hungarian travel book, Europica Varietas.

Márton Csombor was born in Szepsi, then the Kingdom of Hungary. In 1618 he undertook a 700-mile-long journey, mostly on foot, across Europe, which he recorded in his Europica Varietas, published in Hungarian in 1620.

== Works ==
- All Works by Márton Szepsi Csombor, introductory study written by Iván Sándor Kovács, translation by Péter Kulcsár, Budapest: Neumann Publishing House, 2002
- 1620: Europica Varietas, subtitled "Poland, Mazury, Prussia, Denmark, Frisia, Holland, Zealand, England, Gaul, Germany and the Czech Republic; Or: A short description of various things seen and heard in the Prussian, Pomerania, Sweden, Norway, Frisia, Zealand, and British Seas. Which may serve not only to the delight of every reader, but also to the benefit of many"
- 1623: Udvari Schola

== Commemoration ==
- Szepsi Csombor Márton High School
- Szepsi Csombor Literary Circle
Major cities visited by Márton Szepsi Csombor
