= Provisional Political Committee of the Kaunas Land =

Pro-Polish committee in Vilnius, Lithuania, in the 1920s

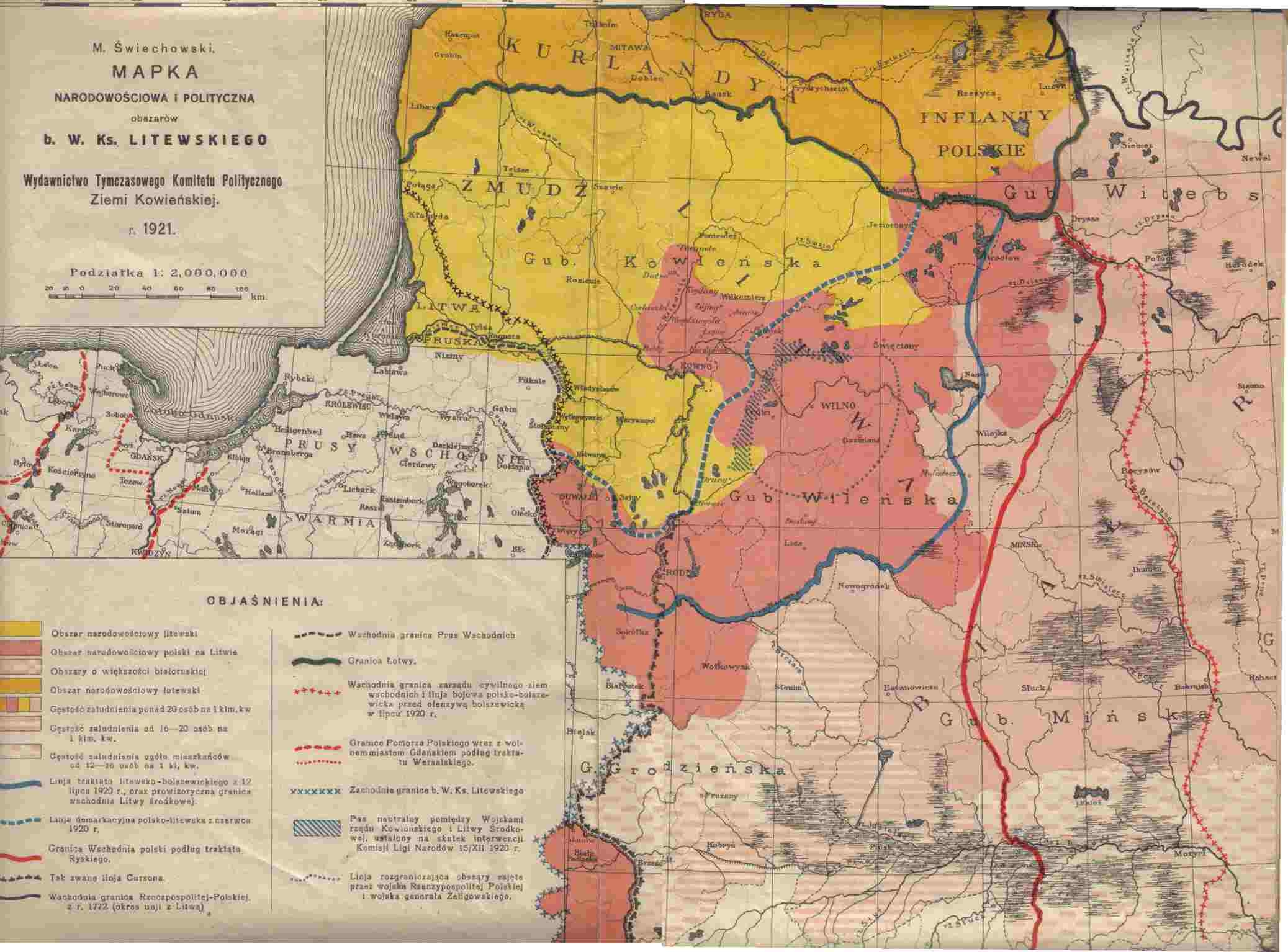
Propaganda map published by TKPZK in 1921, claiming to show the ethnic and political map of the western part of the former Grand Duchy of Lithuania. Red is supposed to mean Poles in Lithuania, and yellow for Lithuanians.

Provisional Political Committee of the Kaunas Land (Polish: Tymczasowy Komitet Polityczny Ziemi Kowieńskiej, TKPZK) was a pro-Polish committee operating in Vilnius in the early 1920s, bringing together both incorporationists, who wanted a direct Polish annexation of Lithuania, and federalists, who wanted a federation between Lithuania and Poland. Both of them strove for the historical Polish–Lithuanian union between Lithuania and the Second Polish Republic through military occupation of the Kaunas Region, which included Kaunas, the temporary capital of Lithuania, and would have meant the end of the recently re-established independent Lithuania. Apart from their political activities, they also published propaganda to popularize their goals.

After the Polish occupation of the independent Lithuania, the committee planned to become its government. The solution assumed by the Committee was also aided by the control of the Klaipėda Region by the pro-Polish French military occupation, separated from East Prussia partially due to the initiative of Polish diplomacy.

TKPZK gathered mainly Polonized landowners from ethnically Lithuanian territories that had left independent Lithuania for Poland. Being the most dynamic political group in Vilnius, it strongly influenced General Lucjan Żeligowski, among others. The committee presented a plan to "resolve" the Polish–Lithuanian dispute, which had led to an intensification of the Polish–Lithuanian War, through Żeligowski's Mutiny, Polish occupation of Vilnius and the subsequent offensive on Kaunas that had its occupation as a goal.

On 20 September 1919, Marian Świechowski submitted a memorandum to the Polish Chief of State entitled "For the immediate intervention of troops in ethnographic Lithuania" (Polish: O niezwłoczną interwencję wojsk na Litwie etnograficznej), where, among other things, he argued that the Polish side should attack while the Lithuanian "folk" (Polish: lud) were not yet completely deceived and the Council of Lithuania remained relatively weak. The following people belonged to the committee or cooperated with it, among others: Marian Świechowski, Władysław Wielhorski, Leon Wasilewski and Colonel Mścisław Butkiewicz, under whose command a cavalry brigade invaded Lithuania as far as Kėdainiai.

The military circles in the Army of Central Lithuania (a Polish puppet state) that were influenced TKPZK clearly wanted for the Polish army to march on Kaunas. This led to a bold cavalry raid which threatened Kaunas but ultimately led, among other things, to the collapse of the Polish offensive. The offensive's failure and the ceasefire meant the failure for the search of a military end to the Polish–Lithuanian dispute.

== Sources ==
- Buchowski, Krzysztof (2006), Litwomani i polonizatorzy (in Polish), Białystok: Wydawnictwo Uniwersytetu w Białymstoku, ISBN 978-83-7431-075-8, OCLC 830808275
- Komorowski, Bronisław (13 October 2010). "Węzeł wileński" [Vilnius knot]. Polityka (in Polish).

== See also ==
- Polish–Lithuanian War
- Republic of Central Lithuania
- History of Poles in Lithuania
- Liauda
