= Statue of Maria Wittek =

Monument in Warsaw, Poland

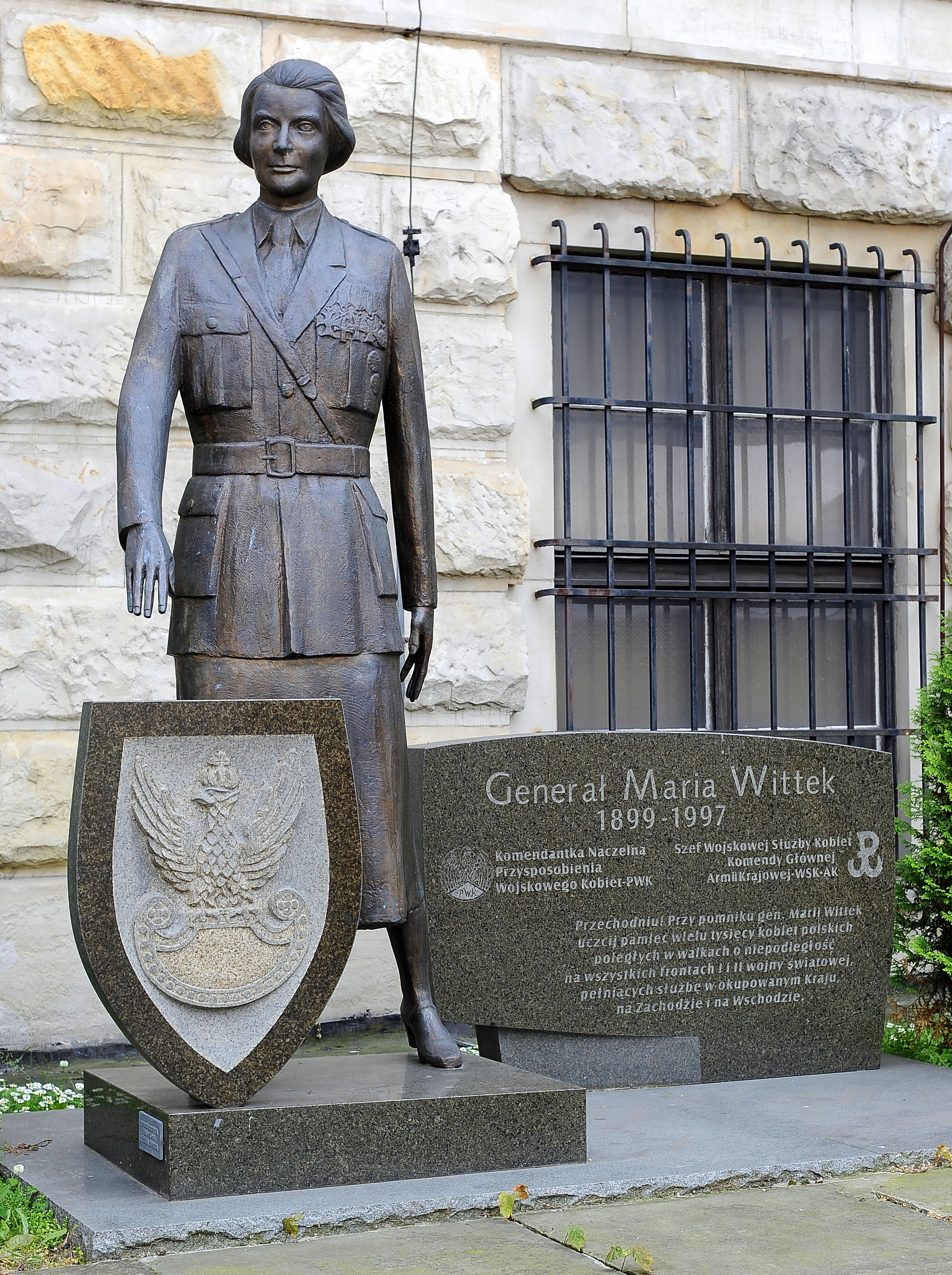
- The monument in 2010.
- Interactive map of Statue of Maria Wittek
- Location: 3 Jerusalem Avenue, Warsaw, Poland
- Coordinates: 52°13′54.5″N 21°01′32″E
- Designer: Jan Bohdan Chmielewski
- Type: Statue
- Opening date: 19 April 2007
- Dedicated to: Maria Wittek

The statue of Maria Wittek (Polish: Pomnik Marii Wittek) is a monument in Warsaw, Poland, placed at the courtyard of the National Museum in Warsaw at 3 Jerusalem Avenue. It is dedicated to Maria Wittek, veteran of the First and Second World Wars, and the first woman to receive rank of brigadier general in the Polish Armed Forces. The monument was designed by Jan Bohdan Chmielewski and unveiled on 19 April 2007.

== History ==
The monument was financed by Elżbieta Zawacka, general in the Polish Armed Forces. It was dedicated to Maria Wittek, veteran of the First and Second World Wars, who served during the Invasion of Poland and the Warsaw Uprising, among others. In 1991, she was given the rank of the brigadier general, becoming the first woman in the Polish Armed Forces to do so. The monument was designed by Jan Bohdan Chmielewski and unveiled on 19 April 2007. It was placed at the courtyard of the Polish Army Museum, which currently belongs to the National Museum in Warsaw.

== Characteristics ==
The moment is placed at the courtyard of the National Museum in Warsaw at 3 Jerusalem Avenue. It consists of the statue of general Maria Wittek, wearing a military uniform. Next to her legs is placed a shield with the relief depicting the insignia of the Polish Armed Forces, in form of the military eagle, with crown and raised wings, that is perched on a pelte shield. To her right is placed an epitaph panel, with the inscription as transcribed below.

Polish inscription

Gererał Maria Wittek
1899–1997
Komendantka Naczelna Przysposobienia Wojskowego Kobiet – PWK
Szwef Wojskowej Służby Kobiet Komendy Głównej Armii Krajowej – WSK-AK
Przechodniu! Przy pomniku gen. Marii Wittek uczci pamięć wielu tysięcy kobiet polskiech poległych w walkach o niepodległość na wszyskich frontach I i II wojny światowej, pełniących służbę w okupowanym kraju, na Zachodzie i na Wschodzie.

Translation:
English translation

General Maria Wittek
1899–1997
Commander-in-Chief of the Women's Military Training
Chief of the Women's Military Service of the Home Army Major Command
You that walk by! Next to the monument of general Maria Wittek, give honour the thousands of women who have fallen in the battles for the independence, fought on all fronts of the First and Second World Wars, that served in the occupied Country, in the West, and in the East.
