= Leon Wasilewski =

Activist of the Polish Socialist Party

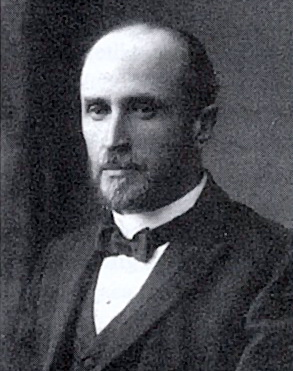
- Leon Wasilewski

Minister of Foreign Affairs of Poland
- In office 17 November 1918 – 16 January 1919
- Preceded by: Władysław Wróblewski
- Succeeded by: Ignacy Paderewski (acting)

Personal details
- Born: 24 August 1870 Saint Petersburg, Russia
- Died: 10 December 1936 (aged 66) Warsaw, Poland
- Party: Polish Socialist Party
- Relations: Halszka Wasilewska and Wanda Wasilewska
- Occupation: Politician
- Committees: architect of Polish foreign policy

Leon Wasilewski (1870–1936) was an activist of the Polish Socialist Party (PPS), a coworker of Józef Piłsudski, Polish Minister of Foreign Affairs, designer of much of Second Polish Republic policy towards Eastern Europe, historian and father of Halszka Wasilewska and of Wanda Wasilewska.

== Life and career ==
Born on 24 August 1870 in Saint Petersburg, to an impoverished gentry family with roots in Livonia and Samogitia. His father was an organist at Saint Stanislaus church in St. Petersburg. His mother, Maria Reiter, was a teacher of mixed German and Czech ancestry, and came from Moravia. After completing his secondary education he attended Lwow University, where he met his future wife, Wanda Zieleniewska. Both were involved in student politics. He dropped out of his course to follow his political ambitions. Later he briefly attended Prague University, where he met Jan Masaryk. He and Wanda had three daughters: Halszka (born in London) and Wanda and Sofia Aldona (born in Kraków).

=== Politician ===
After a brief participation in the endecja movement (Liga Narodowa), he joined the PPS in Galicia in the 1890s - he would remain a member of the party for his entire life (and join the party's top policy-making body in the late 1920s). Editor of Przedświt (PPS publication in London), and later, Robotnik in Galicia. He was loyal to Piłsudski, even during the PPS split in the 1900s, when he remained with his Revolution Faction. Activist in the Komisja Tymczasowa Skonfederowanych Stronnictw Niepodległościowych (1912–1914). During the First World War, he was a member of several Polish organizations, including the Chief National Committee, and from 1917, a member of the Polish Military Organisation. After Poland regained independence, he became the first Polish Minister of Foreign Affairs, serving in the government of Jędrzej Moraczewski from 17 November 1918 to 16 January 1919. Afterwards he served as an advisor to Chief of State Józef Piłsudski; he was a member of the Polish National Committee in Paris (in 1919) and Provisional Political Committee of the Kaunas Land that sought Polish occupation of Lithuania; and served as the Polish ambassador to Estonia (1920–1921). He took part in the Treaty of Riga negotiations and the commission for the delimitation of Poland's eastern borders.

=== Scholar ===
Afterwards he concentrated on historical research. He researched linguistics (particularly Slavic languages), ethnography of the Central and Eastern European lands, and history of literature. He would serve as the director of two institutes (Instytut Badania Najnowszej Historii Polski (Institute of Studies of Modern Polish History) in the 1920s and Instytut Badań Narodowościowych (Institute of Nationality Studies) in the 1930s) and editor of the journal Niepodległośc. Supporter of Międzymorze federation idea, as well as Prometheism, he was also a vocal opponent of polonization, arguing that Ukrainians and Belarusians living in Poland should be allowed to assimilate into Polish society at their will and speed. Author of many works, among them Litwa i Białoruś ("Lithuania and Belarus", 1912), Ukraińska sprawa narodowa w jej rozwoju historycznym ("The Ukrainian National Cause in its Historical Development", 1925), Zarys dziejów PPS ("A Short History of the PPS", 1925), Józef Piłsudski, jakim go znałem ("Józef Piłsudski, as I knew him", 1935).

His daughter, Wanda Wasilewska, was a prominent pro-Soviet communist activist in the People's Republic of Poland.

== Works ==
- Litwa i Białoruś (Lithuania and Belarus) (1912)
- Kresy Wschodnie - Litwa i Białoruś. Podlasie i Chełmszczyzna. Galicya Wschodnia. Ukraina (1917)
- Zarys dziejów PPS (Overview of the History of PPS) (1925)
- Józef Piłsudski, jakim go znałem (Józef Piłsudski as I Knew Him) (1935)

== See also ==
- Tadeusz Hołówko
- Poles in the United Kingdom
