= History of Poles in Lithuania =

The history of Poles in Lithuania describes the history of Polish culture and language in Lithuanian lands, as well as the process of formation in the Polish community there before 1990.

During the Polish–Lithuanian union, there was an influx of Poles into the Grand Duchy of Lithuania and the gradual Polonization of its elite and upper classes. At the end of the Polish-Lithuanian Commonwealth in 1795, almost all of Lithuania's nobility, clergy, and townspeople spoke Polish and adopted Polish culture, while still maintaining a Lithuanian identity. In the late 19th century, due to the processes of Polonization of Lithuanian and Belarusian peasants Polish population lived mainly on a long strip of land, stretching to Daugavpils and including Vilnius. The rise of the Lithuanian national movement led to conflicts between both groups. Following World War I and the rebirth of both states, there was the Polish–Lithuanian War, whose main focus was Vilnius and the nearby region. In its aftermath, the majority of the Polish population living in the Lithuanian lands found themselves within the Polish borders. However, interwar Lithuania still retained a large Polish minority. During World War II, the Polish population was persecuted by the USSR and Nazi Germany. Post-World War II, the borders were changed, territorial disputes were suppressed as the Soviet Union exercised power over both countries and a significant part of the Polish population, especially the best-educated, was forcefully transferred from the Lithuanian SSR to the Polish People's Republic. At the same time, a significant number of Poles relocated from nearby regions of Byelorussian SSR to Vilnius and Vilnius region.

Currently, the Polish population is grouped in the Vilnius region, primarily the Vilnius and Šalčininkai districts. In the city of Vilnius alone there are more than 85,000 Poles, who make up about 15% of the Lithuanian capital's population. Most Poles in Lithuania are Roman Catholic and speak Polish, although a minority of them speak Russian or Lithuanian, as their first language.

== Grand Duchy of Lithuania ==
=== From the 13th century to 1569 ===
The first Poles appeared in Lithuania long before the Union of Krewo in 1385. The early Polish population was composed mainly of enslaved war captives (Note: M. B. Topolska estimates their number at twelve or so thousand in 1201–1382. Numbers as high as 100–170 thousand are also mentioned in historiography.) who assimilated relatively quickly. The Lithuanian slave raids into Poland continued until the second half of the 14th century. The process of voluntary Polish migration began in the mid-13th century, nonetheless Poles did not start to migrate to Lithuania in more noticeable numbers until Christianization of the country.

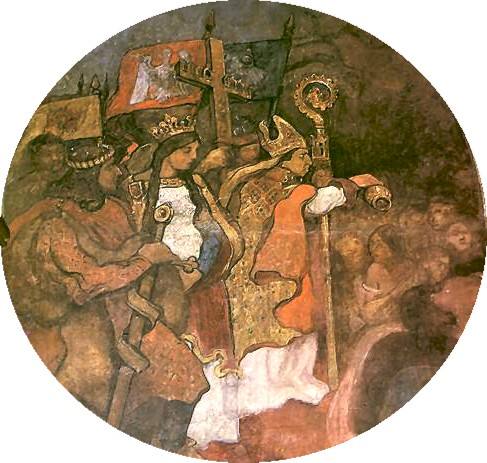
Andrzej Jastrzębiec was the first Bishop of Vilnius. He is depicted in the fresco "Baptism of Lithuania" by Włodzimierz Tetmajer

Between 1387 and 1569, members of various Polish social strata (i.e. burghers, clergy, merchants, and szlachta) moved to Lithuania, although this migration was not large-scale. The Poles settled mainly in urban centers, on Catholic church grounds, and concentrated at aristocratic courts. Many Poles worked in the Grand Ducal latin chancellery. Mikołaj Cebulka was appointed the senior secretary by Vytautas. Klemens Moskarzewski was the starosta of Vilnius and a commander during the city's successful defence in 1390, when it was besieged by Vytautas and Teutonic Knights. In the same year, Jaśko of Oleśnica became the governor of Lithuania on behalf of king Władysław II Jagiełło (Jogaila). Another Pole, Mikołaj Sapieński, participated in the Council of Constance as one of three leaders of the Samogitian delegation.

By the end of the 15th century, several Polish families from Podlachia were included in the governing elite (Note: Which consisted of around 100 families in total) of the Grand Duchy. In the 15th and 16th century, the Polish population in Lithuania was not large numerically, but the Poles enjoyed a privileged social position – they were found in highly regarded places and their culture was considered prestigious. With time Polish people became also part of the local landowning class. (Note: Even though it was either prohibited or legally restricted. In the 16th century, Samogitian nobles complained to the Grand Duke of Lithuania about granting land and positions to outsiders, Poles and others. According to Rita Regina Trimonienė, of the 350 foreign nobles who settled in Samogitia in years 1550–1650, 80% were Poles. They became members of the local political-economic elite.) A relocation of a Polish noble to the Grand Duchy tended to trigger a chain of further arrivals, often motivated by family ties or geographic links. Lithuanian nobles welcomed fugitive Polish peasants and settled them on uncultivated land, but they usually assimilated with Belarusians and Lithuanians peasants within few generations. Polish peasants took also part in the colonization of the Neman river area. In the 16th century, the largest concentrations of Poles in the GDL were located in Podlachia (Note: Podlachia was part of the Grand Duchy of Lithuania between the late 13th century and 1569. The region was a sphere of old Polish-Mazovian settlement and was governed according to the Polish law since 1514. In the mid-16th century, the Poles became the dominant group among the Podlachian gentry, which led to demands from the local deputies for the complete union of their lands with Poland. With time, Mazovians also started to predominate in Podlachian towns. The total number of Poles in the Grand Duchy of Lithuania decreased with the loss of Podlachia and lands in Ukraine.) the border areas of Samogitia, Lithuania and Belarus, and the cities of Vilnius, Brest, Kaunas, Grodno, Kėdainiai, and Nyasvizh.

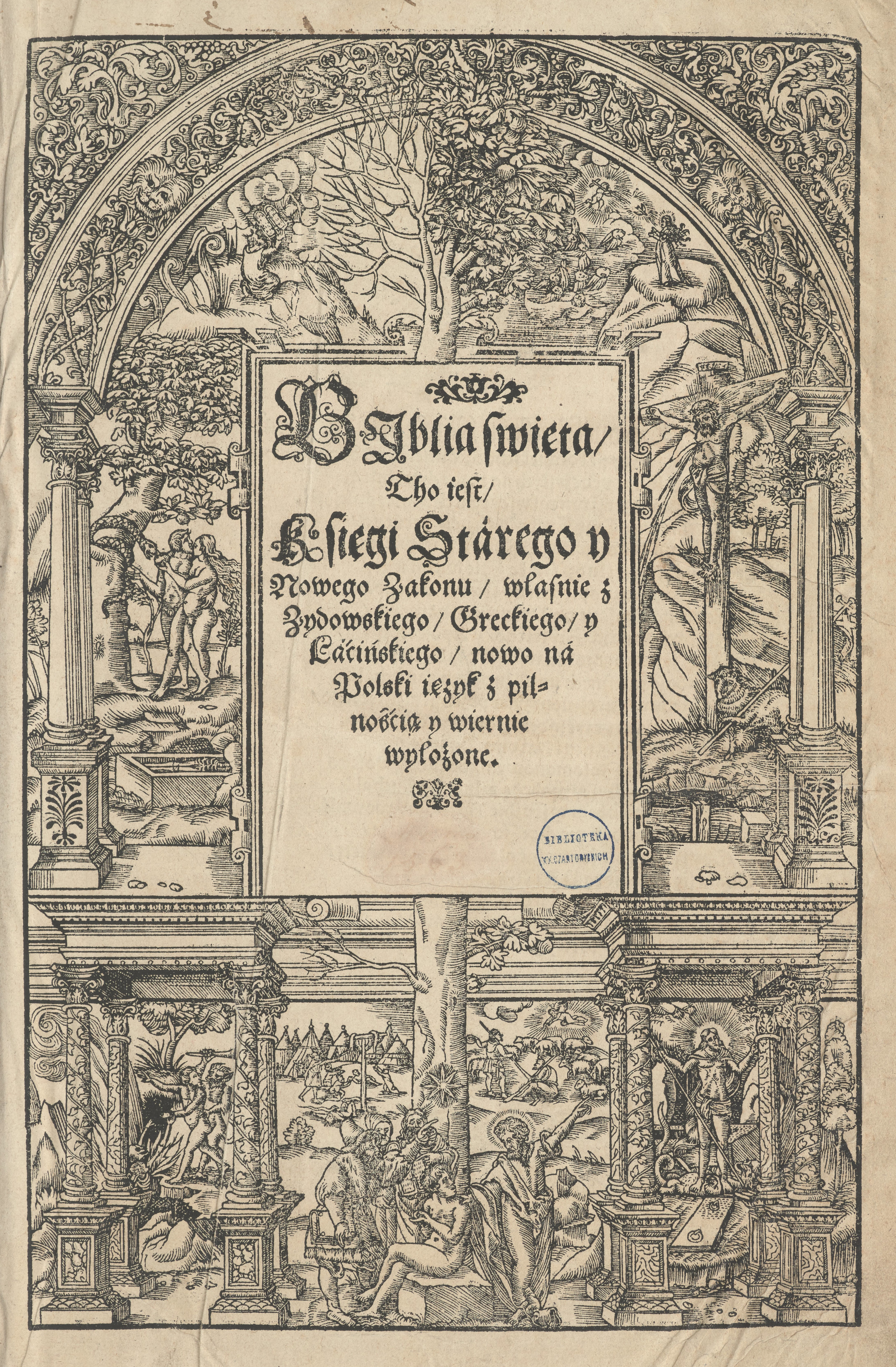
The so-called Brest Bible, the first complete translation of the Bible into Polish from the original languages, was published in the Grand Duchy of Lithuania under the patronage of the Grand Chancellor of Lithuania, Mikołaj Radziwiłł the Black.

As a result of the Union of Krewo, the Grand Duchy of Lithuania found itself drawn towards cultural and political orbit of the Kingdom of Poland. Polish quickly supplanted Ruthenian as the language of Lithuanian elite after the latter had switched to speaking Ruthenian and Polish at the beginning of the 16th century. In the 16th century, the royal and grand ducal courts were nearly entirely composed of Polish speakers. The numbers of Poles in Lithuania were additionally augmented by the almost constant (since the mid-16th century) stationing of Polish military. (Note: Robert I. Frost writes that there were "large numbers of Poles in Lithuania" under Sigismund's rule.) Around 1552, Kalisz Chamberlain Piotr Chwalczewski became administrator of Lithuania's royal castles and estates. Since 1558, he was also responsible for coordination of the agrarian reform which was implemented by specialists brought from Poland. Reformation gave another impetus to the spread of Polish, as the Bible and other religious texts were translated from Latin to Polish. Since the second half of the 16th century, Poles predominated in Protestant schools and printing houses in Lithuania, and the life of local protestant congregations.

=== From 1569 to 1795 ===
After the Union of Lublin, the influx of Poles to the Grand Duchy significantly increased, particularly nobles from Masovia and Lesser Poland. This population movement created a fertile ground for socio-cultural Polonization of Lithuania. Poor nobles from the Crown rented land from local magnates. The number of Poles grew also in the towns, among others in Vilnius, Kaunas, and Grodno. There were numerous Poles among the Jesuits residing in Lithuania, including such prominent figures like Piotr Skarga (1536–1612), the first rector of the University of Vilnius, Jakub Wujek (1541–1597), and Maciej Kazimierz Sarbiewski (1595–1640). From 1397 to the 16th century, the Chapter of Vilnius numbered 123 Canons, of whom 90 were from the Crown and Podlachia, and 33 or more were Lithuanians.

While Poles and foreigners were generally prohibited from holding public offices in the Grand Duchy, Polish people gradually gained this right through the acquisition of Lithuanian land. For example, Mikołaj Radzimiński (c. 1585–c. 1630) became a marshal of Lithuanian Tribunal and the Starosta of Mstsislaw, Piotr Wiesiołowski was the grand marshal of Lithuania (nominated in 1615), Janusz Lacki (d. 1646) was Vilnius Chamberlain, Minsk Castellan, and the General Starosta of Samogitia (in 1643–1646).

Already at the beginning of the 16th century, Polish became the first language of the Lithuanian magnates. In the following century it was adopted by the Lithuanian nobility in general. Even the nobility of Žemaitija used the Polish language already in the 17th century. At the beginning of the 18th century, the Polish language was adopted by the entire nobility of the grand duchy – Lithuanian, Ruthenian, German and Tatar. The Polish language also penetrated other social strata: the clergy, the townspeople, and even the peasants. During the Commonwealth's period, a Polish-dominated territory started to be slowly formed in the Grand Duchy of Lithuania, such as Liauda, northeast of Kaunas (since the early 15th century). According to the Polish historian Barbara Topolska, by the mid-17th century, Poles made up several percent of the total population in the Grand Duchy. The Polish historian Władysław Wielhorski estimated that by the end of the 18th century, Polish and Polonized people constituted 25% of the grand duchy's inhabitants.

=== Vilnius ===
The influx of Polish population to Vilnius started in the late 14th century. Vilnius was also the only place in present-day Lithuania where, in the 15th century, an ethnically restricted community of Poles was established. Another one, more numerous, was likely created in the area of present-day Belarus. The city became the most important center of the Polish intelligentsia in the Grand Duchy. In the 16th century, Poles constituted 40% of all professors at Vilnius Academy, in the 17th century – 60%, and they were 30% of the teaching cadre in the 18th century. Ethnic Poles made up around 50% of Vilnius urban officials during the Baroque period, and by the 17th century the city became culturally Polish. Poles were the predominant population in Vilnius in the middle of the 17th century. In 1785, Wojciech Bogusławski, who is considered the "father" of Polish theatre, opened the first public theatre in Vilnius.

== 19th century ==
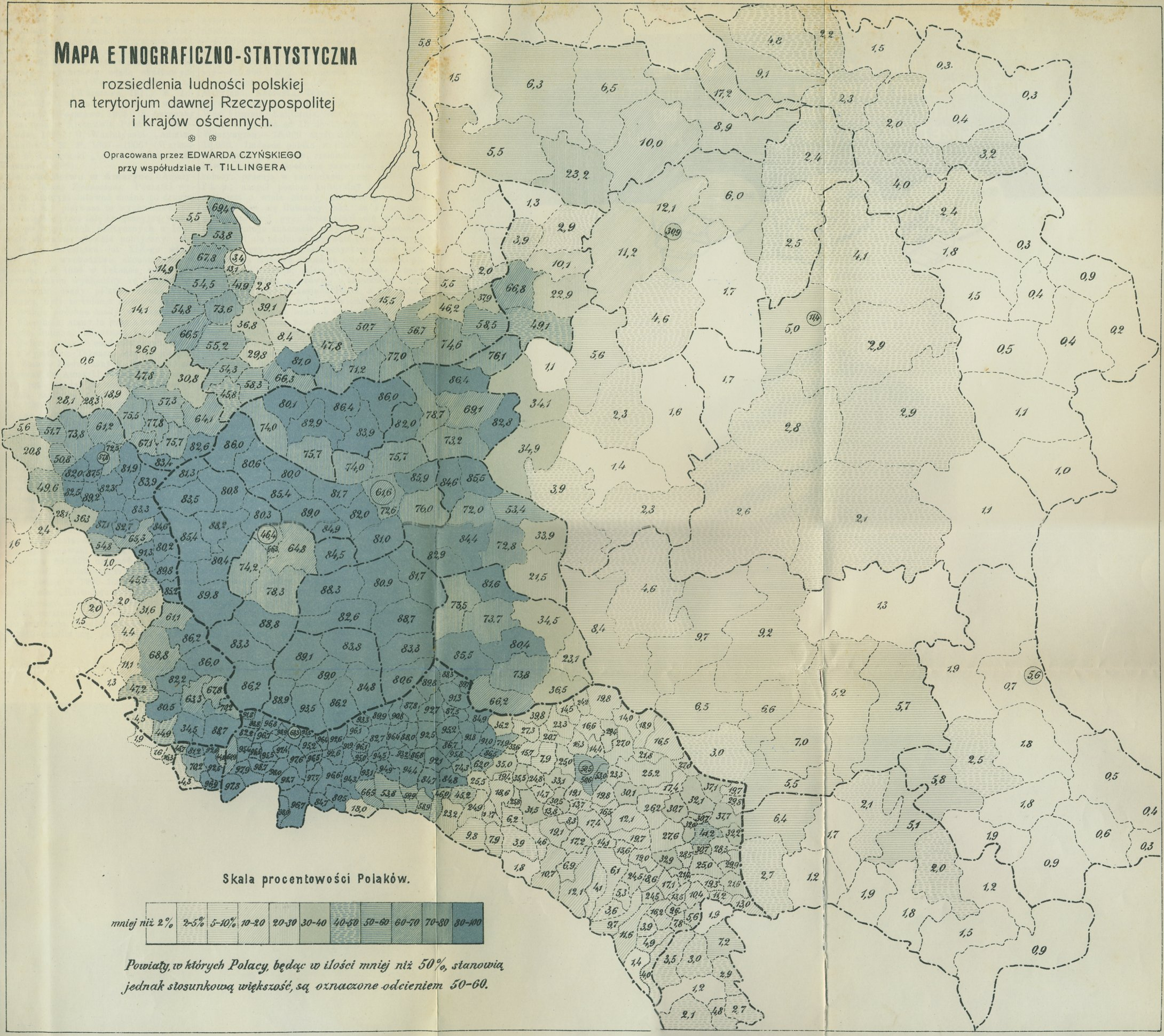
Distribution of Polish population (1912) incorporates data from the 1897 Russian census. A map by Henryk Merczyng

Polish Interwar map of distribution of Polish population (incorporates data from the 1916 German census)

Until the 1830s, Polish was used for the administrative purposes in the so called Western Krai area, which included the Grand Duchy's lands annexed by the Russian Empire in the partitions of the Commonwealth. During the 19th century, Poles were the largest Christian nationality in Vilnius. They also predominated in the municipal government of the city in the earlier half of the 19th century. The Polish-language university was re-established in Vilnius in 1803 and closed in 1832. After the 1863 uprising, the Russian law prohibited public use of the Polish language and teaching it to peasants, as well as possession of Polish books by the latter. The members of szlachta class, notwithstanding their varied ethnic roots, generally opted for Polish self-identification in the course of the 19th century.

In the 19th century Polish culture was spreading among the lower classes of Lithuania, mainly in Dzūkija and to a lesser degree in Aukštaitija. A complicated linguistic situation developed on the territory of the Grand Duchy of Lithuania. Polish speakers used a "Kresy" variant of Polish (Northern Borderlands dialect) that retained archaic Polish features as well as many remnants of Belarusian and some features of Lithuanian. Linguists distinguish between official language, used in the Church and cultural activities, and colloquial language, closer to the speech of the common people. Inhabitants of a significant part of the Vilnius region used a variant of the Belarusian language, which was influenced mainly by Polish, but also by Lithuanian, Russian and Jewish. This language was referred to as "simple speech" (Polish: mowa prosta), and was treated by many as a dialect variety of Polish. In fact, it was a kind of "mixed language" serving as an interdialect of the cultural borderland. This language became a gateway to the progressive Slavization of the Lithuanian population. The knowledge of Slavonic interdialect made it easier for Lithuanians to communicate with their Slavic neighbors, who spoke Polish, Russian, or Belarusian. The attractiveness and cultural prestige of the Polish language and its common use in church caused the process to continue and lead to the full adoption of the Polish language. Among the Belarusian population, the usage of Polish was limited to official relations, while at home, the local language was still spoken. As a result, the Lithuanian language retreated under the pressure of Polish faster than Belarusian. This led to the formation of a compact Polish language area between the Lithuanian and Belarusian language areas, with Vilnius as the center. The position of Vilnius as an important Polish cultural center influenced the development of national identities among Roman Catholic peasants in the region. A significant part of the population of the Polish–Lithuanian–Belarusian borderlands for a long time did not have a clearly declared nationality and described themselves as "locals" (tutejszy). The Slavic speakers inhabiting the area around Vilnius consistently chose Polish nationality in all the censuses conducted after the end of the 19th century.

The emergence of the Lithuanian national movement in the 1880s slowed down the process of Polonization of the ethnically Lithuanian population, but also cemented a sense of national identity among a significant portion of the Polish-speaking Lithuanian population. The feeling of a two-tier Lithuanian-Polish national identity, present throughout the period, had to give way to a clear national declaration. Previously, every inhabitant of the former Grand Duchy of Lithuania had been considered a Lithuanian, but in the face of the emergence of the Lithuanian national movement, which considered only those who spoke Lithuanian as Lithuanians, Polish-speaking residents of Lithuania more and more often declared themselves as Poles. The dispute over the auxiliary language of services (Polish or Lithuanian) in the churches on the eastern border of ethnic Lithuania, which heated up from the end of the nineteenth century, influenced the formation of Polish consciousness and the adoption of the Polish language among those believers whose ancestors had abandoned Lithuanian for plain speech.

== Polish-Lithuanian conflict ==
By the time of the Polish–Lithuanian war, Poles made up also almost all of the local aristocracy and richer landowners in Vilnius and its surroundings. Most descendants of the Lithuanian noble class opposed the Belarusian and Lithuanian national revivals and fought for Poland in 1918–1920. From 1918 to 1921 there were several conflicts, such as the activity of the Polish Military Organisation, Sejny uprising and a foiled attempt at a Polish coup of the Lithuanian government. As a result of the Polish-Lithuanian war and Żeligowski's mutiny the border between independent Lithuania and Poland was drawn more or less according to the linguistic division of the region. Nevertheless, many Poles lived in the Lithuanian state and a significant Lithuanian minority found itself within the Polish borders. The loss of Vilnius was a painful blow to Lithuanian aspirations and identity. The irredentist demand for its recovery became one of the most important elements of socio-political life in interwar Lithuania and resulted in the emergence of hostility and resentment against the Poles.

== Interbellum ==
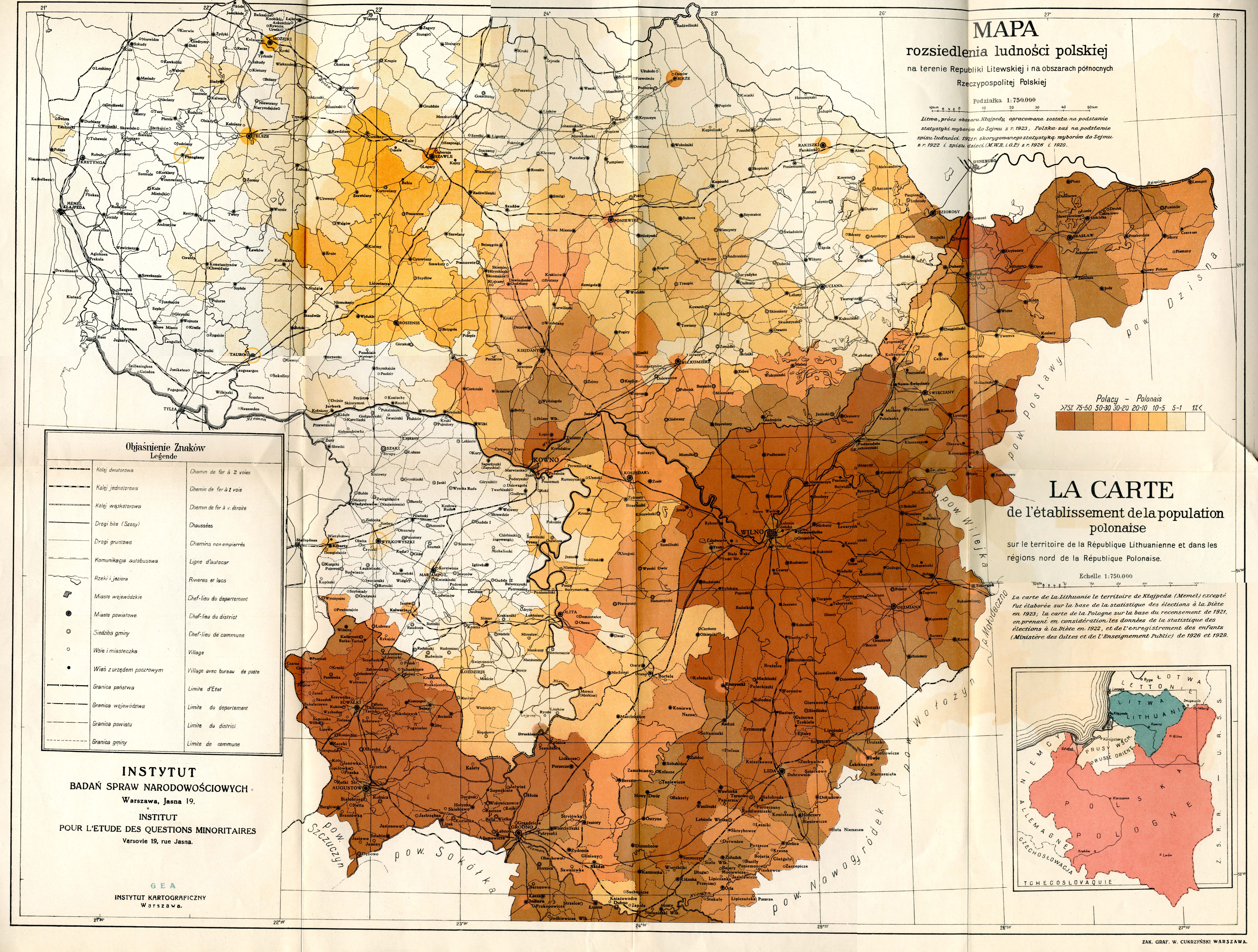
Polish population in Lithuania and northern Poland (1929, Poland's Institute for the Study of Nationalities), a map interpreting the results of the elections to the parliament of Lithuania in 1923, Polish 1921 census, and elections to the Polish parliament in 1922

=== In the Republic of Lithuania ===
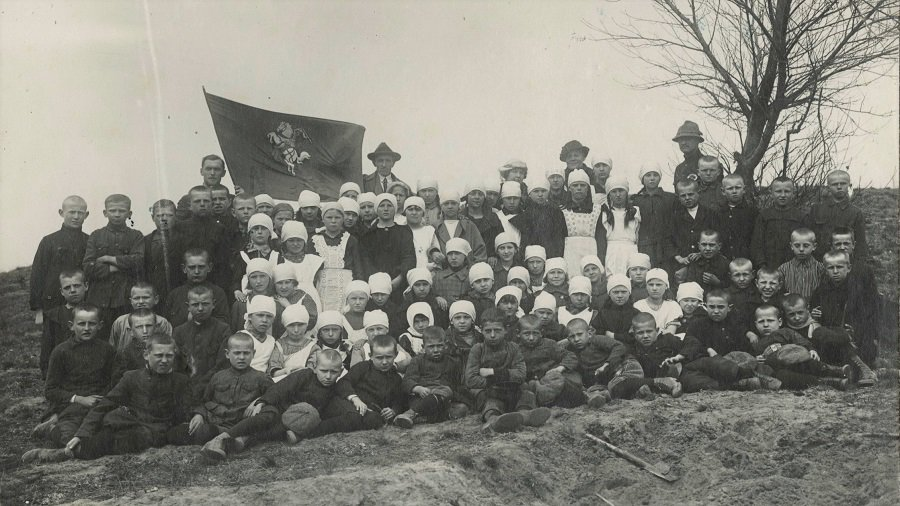
Poles in the interwar Lithuanian state, between 1923–1924

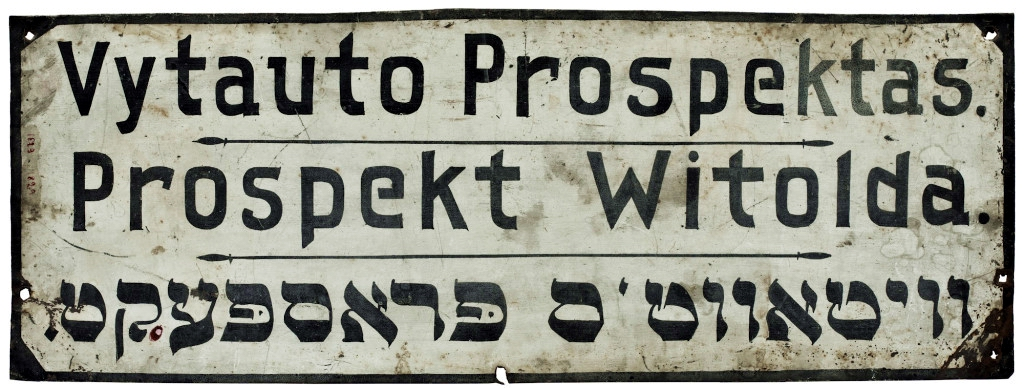
Threelingual street sign of Vytautas avenue in the Temporary capital of Lithuania Kaunas during the interwar with Polish language inscription

In interwar Lithuania, people declaring Polish ethnicity were officially described as Polonized Lithuanians who needed to be re-Lithuanized, Polish-owned land was confiscated, Polish religious services, schools, publications and voting rights were restricted. According to the Lithuanian census of 1923 (not including Vilnius and Klaipėda regions), there were 65,600 Poles in Lithuania (3.2% of the total population). Although according to Polish Election Committee in fact the number of Poles was 202,026, so about 10% of total population. This number was based on election results. The Poles were concentrated in the districts of Kaunas, Kėdainiai, Kaišiadorys and Ukmergė, in each of which they constituted 20–30% of the population.

The Polish Parliamentary Faction numbered three deputies after 1921 elections (Bronisław Laus, Adolf Grajewski and Józef Śnielewski), four deputies after the 1923 elections (Wiktor Budzyński, Bolesław Lutyk, Wincenty Rumpel and Kazimierz Wołkowycki) and four again after 1926 elections (Jan Bucewicz, Wiktor Budzyński, Tomasz Giżyński and Bolesław Lutyk). However, their possibilities for action were limited, because, like all minority representatives, they were excluded from parliamentary committees.

In 1919, Poles owned 90% of estates larger than 100 ha. By 1928, 2,997 large estates with a total area of 555,207 ha were parceled out, and 52,935 new farms were created in their place and given to Lithuanian peasants. A large part of Polish landowners who were deprived of their property left Lithuania.

Polish schools in the interwar Lithuania
	1925/1926	1926/1927	1927/1928	1928/1929
Number of Polish elementary schools	7	75	20	14
Number of employed Polish teachers	10	90	22	17
Number of pupils	365	4 089	554	450

Many Poles in Lithuania were signed in as Lithuanians in their passports, and as a result, they also were forced to attend Lithuanian schools. Polish education was organized by the Association for the Promotion of Culture and Education among Poles in Lithuania "Pochodnia". While the number of Polish-language schools in Lithuania increased from 20 to 30 from 1920 to 1923, and to 78 in 1926, then decreased to 9 by 1940. After the establishment of Valdemaras regime in 1926, 58 Polish schools were closed, many Poles were incarcerated, and Polish newspapers were placed under strict censorship. All national minorities in Lithuania were excluded from studying medicine in the country. And at the Pedagogical Institute of the Republic in Klaipėda Poles were subject to numerus clausus. At other universities Poles were not restricted and in 1929 there were about 150 Polish students in Lithuania. Most Poles chose to study abroad. In 1928, the Union of Polish Academic Youth of Lithuania (ZPAML) was founded. As a result of the introduction of a new restrictive law on associations, ZPMAL ended its activities at the end of 1938, along with 14 other Polish organizations.

There were six Polish periodicals in Lithuania, including the most important daily "Dzień Kowieński" (later "Dzień Polski"). They were subject to censorship and numerous restrictions. Over time, the Polish language was also removed from the Church. Since 1929, there has been no teaching of the Polish language at the Kaunas Seminary. Polish priests were transferred to parishes with a majority of Lithuanian believers. Services in Polish were often interrupted by Lithuanian nationalists. This situation intensified especially in the first half of 1924 in Kaunas, when masses were drowned out and the faithful beaten. These situations occurred in most towns where Poles constituted a significant percentage. As a result, just before the war there were only 2 Polish priests working in Lithuania, and only in a few parishes masses were celebrated partially in Polish. The most tragic episode in the history of Poles in interwar Lithuania was an anti-Polish demonstration organized by the Lithuanian Riflemen's Union on 23 May 1930 in Kaunas, which turned into a riot. Seats of Polish organizations, editorial offices, Polish schools and a Polish gymnasium were demolished.

Politically, Polish circles were divided into two groups. The first derived from the traditions of the Krajowcy group and was based on loyalty to the Lithuanians. They were concentrated around the Polish Central Committee in Kaunas. The second group, composed mainly of young people, mainly academic youth, pushed a more nationalist stance, intensified by the repressive policies of the state. This second group was supported by Warsaw and concentrated around the ZPMAL. In 1937 a conflict broke out between the youth leader Tomasz Surwiłło and Alfons Bojko, the editor-in-chief of the "Chata Rodzinna" ("Family Cottage") magazine. The former was supported by Warsaw.

Poles took an active part in the social life of the country. At Kaunas University the rector was law professor Michał Römer. Włodzimierz Szyłkarski taught philosophy, Maria Arcimowiczowa taught Egyptology, Helena Szwejkowska taught Polish literature and language, and Antoni Ignacy Weryha-Darewski taught financial law.

=== In the Second Polish Republic ===
A large portion of the Vilnius area was part of the Second Polish Republic during the interwar period, (Note: In 1923, the Council of Ambassadors and the international community (with the exception of Lithuania) recognized Vilnius and the surrounding area as part of Poland.) particularly the area of the Republic of Central Lithuania, which had a significant Polish speaking population. For example, the Wilno Voivodeship (25% of it is a part of modern Lithuania and 75% – modern Belarus) in 1931 contained 59.7% Polish speakers and only 5.2% Lithuanian speakers.

== After World War II ==
Polish population in 1959 (≥ 20%)
Raion	%
City of Vilnius	20.00%
Vilnius	81.44%
Šalčininkai	83.87%
Nemenčinė	73.21%
Eišiškės	67.40%
Trakai	48.17%
Švenčionys	23.86%
Vievis	22.87%

During the World War II expulsions and shortly after the war, the Soviet Union, during its efforts to establish the People's Republic of Poland, forcibly exchanged population between Poland and Lithuania. During 1945–1948, the Soviet Union allowed 197,000 Poles to leave to Poland; in 1956–1959, another 46,600 were able to leave.

Ethnic Poles made up from 80% to over 91% of Vilnius population in 1944. All Poles in the city were required to register for resettlement, and about 80% of them left for Poland. By March 1946, around 129,000 people from Kaunas region declared their willingness to be relocated to Poland. In most cases, the Soviet authorities blocked the departure of Poles who were interwar Lithuanian citizens and only less than 8,000 of the registered (8.3%) managed to leave for Poland. In 1956–1959, around 3,000 people from Kaunas were repatriated to Poland.

In the 1950s the remaining Polish minority was a target of several attempted campaigns of Lithuanization by the Communist Party of Lithuania, which tried to stop any teaching in Polish; those attempts, however, were vetoed by Moscow, which saw them as nationalistic. The Soviet census of 1959 showed 230,100 Poles concentrated in the Vilnius region (8.5% of the Lithuanian SSR's population). The Polish minority increased in size, but more slowly than other ethnic groups in Lithuania; the last Soviet census of 1989 showed 258,000 Poles (7.0% of the Lithuanian SSR's population). The Polish minority, subject in the past to massive, often voluntary Russification and Sovietization, and recently to voluntary processes of Lithuanization, shows many and increasing signs of assimilation with Lithuanians.

== Bibliography ==
- Budreckis, Algirdas (1967). "Etnografinės Lietuvos Rytinės ir Pietinės Sienos". Karys.
- Butkus, A. (16 December 2015). "Lietuvos gyventojai tautybės požiūriu".
- Dovile Budryte (2005). Taming Nationalism?: Political Community Building in the Post-Soviet Baltic States. Aldershot: Ashgate Publishing. ISBN 0-7546-3757-3.
- Clemens, Walter C. (1991). Baltic Independence and Russian Empire. St. Martin's Press. p. 150. ISBN 0-312-04806-8.
- Januszewska-Jurkiewicz, Joanna (2010). Stosunki narodowościowe na Wileńszczyźnie w latach 1920–1939 [National Relations in the Vilnius Region in the Years 1920–1939]. Katowice.
- Jundo-Kaliszewska, Barbara (2019). Zakładnicy historii. Mniejszość polska w postradzieckiej Litwie [Hostages of history. The Polish minority in post-Soviet Lithuania] (in Polish). Łódź.
- Kurcz, Zbigniew (2005). Mniejszość polska na Wileńszczyźnie. Wrocław: Wydawnictwo Uniwersytetu Wrocławskiego. ISBN 83-229-2601-4.
- Kupczak, Janusz M. (1998). "Z problematyki stosunków narodowościowych na Litwie współczesnej". Politologia. XXII.
- Lane, A. T. (2001). Lithuania: Stepping Westward. Routledge.
- Lipscomb, Glenard P.; Committee for a Free Lithuania (29 May 1958). "Extension of Remarks". Congressional Record Vol. 104 – Appendix. Superintendent of Government Documents.
- Łossowski, Piotr; Bronius Makauskas (2005). Andrzej Koryna (ed.). Kraje bałtyckie w latach przełomu 1934–1944 (in Polish). Warszawa: Instytut Historii PAN; Fundacja Pogranicze. ISBN 83-88909-42-8.
- Rachuba, Andrzej (2010). "Litwini". In Kopczyński, Michał; Tygielski, Wojciech (eds.). Pod wspólnym niebem. Narody dawnej Rzeczypospolitej [Under a Common Sky. Peoples of the former Commonwealth] (in Polish). Warsaw. ISBN 978-83-11-11724-2.
- Senn, Alfred Erich (1997). "Nationality Questions in the Baltic. The Lithuanian Example". In van Horne, Winston A. (ed.). Global Convulsions: Race, Ethnicity, and Nationalism at the End of the Twentieth Century.
- Srebrakowski, Aleksander (2001). Polacy w Litewskiej SSR (in Polish). Adam Marszałek. ISBN 83-7174-857-4.
- Šapoka, Adolfas (2013). Raštai. Vol. I – Vilniaus Istorija (in Lithuanian). Vilnius: Edukologija.
- Trimonienė, Rita (2006). "Polonizacja". Kultura Wielkiego Księstwa Litewskiego. Analizy i obrazy. Kraków. pp. 544–560.
- Turska, Halina (1930). "Język polski na Wileńsczyzne". Wilno i Ziemia Wilenska (in Polish). Vol. I. Polska Drukarnia Nakładowa "LUX" Ludwika Chomińskiego.
- Veblaitis, P. (1956). "Sąmokslas prieš lietuviškas pavardes". Karys.
