= Maria Wittek =

Polish military leader in the Polish Army (1899–1997)

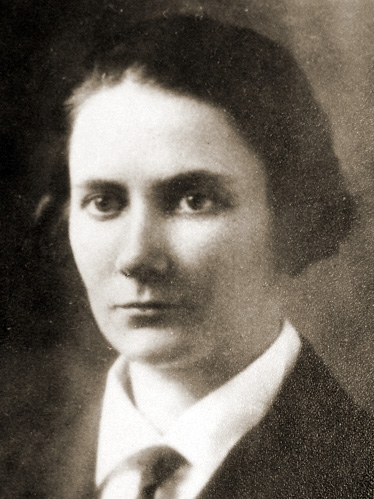
- ps. "Mira","Pani Maria"
- Born: 16 August 1899; Trębki, Mazowsze, Russian Empire
- Died: 19 April 1997 (aged 97); Warsaw, Poland
- Occupation: Military leader

Maria Wittek (noms de guerre "Mira", "Pani Maria"; 16 August 1899 – 19 April 1997) was a Polish military leader who served in the Polish Army and associated organizations from age 18 and, following retirement, in 1991 became the first Polish woman to be promoted to brigadier-general.

== Early service ==
Maria Wittek was born and grew up in the Russian partition of Poland. Her father, Stanisław Wittek, a carpenter, was a member of the Polish Socialist Party (PPS) and moved with his family to Ukraine in 1915 to avoid being arrested by the Russian authorities. Maria while in high school joined the Polish scout troop in Kiev. She then became the first female student in the mathematics department of Kiev University. At the same time she joined the clandestine Polska Organizacja Wojskowa (Polish Military Organization) - and completed the NCO training course. In 1919 she joined the Polish army group that was fighting the Bolsheviks in Ukraine. Then in 1920 as a member of the Women's Volunteers she fought in the battle for Lwów (now Lviv) and was awarded the highest Polish medal Virtuti Militari for the first time.

== Between the wars ==
From 1928 to 1934 she was the commander of the Przysposobienie Wojskowe Kobiet - an organization training women for military service. In 1935 she was appointed the head of the women's division at the Institute of Physical Education and Military Training in Bielany, near Warsaw.

== In World War II ==
During the Invasion of Poland (1939) she was the commanding officer of the Women's Military Assistance Battalions. In October 1939 she joined the underground ZWZ which later became the Home Army. She was head of Women's Army Services on the staff of gen. Grot-Rowecki and later gen. Bor-Komorowski. She fought in the Warsaw Uprising and was promoted lieutenant colonel. After the capitulation she avoided being taken prisoner by the Germans and left the ruins of Warsaw among the civilians. She continued in her staff position of the Home Army until its dissolution in January 1945.

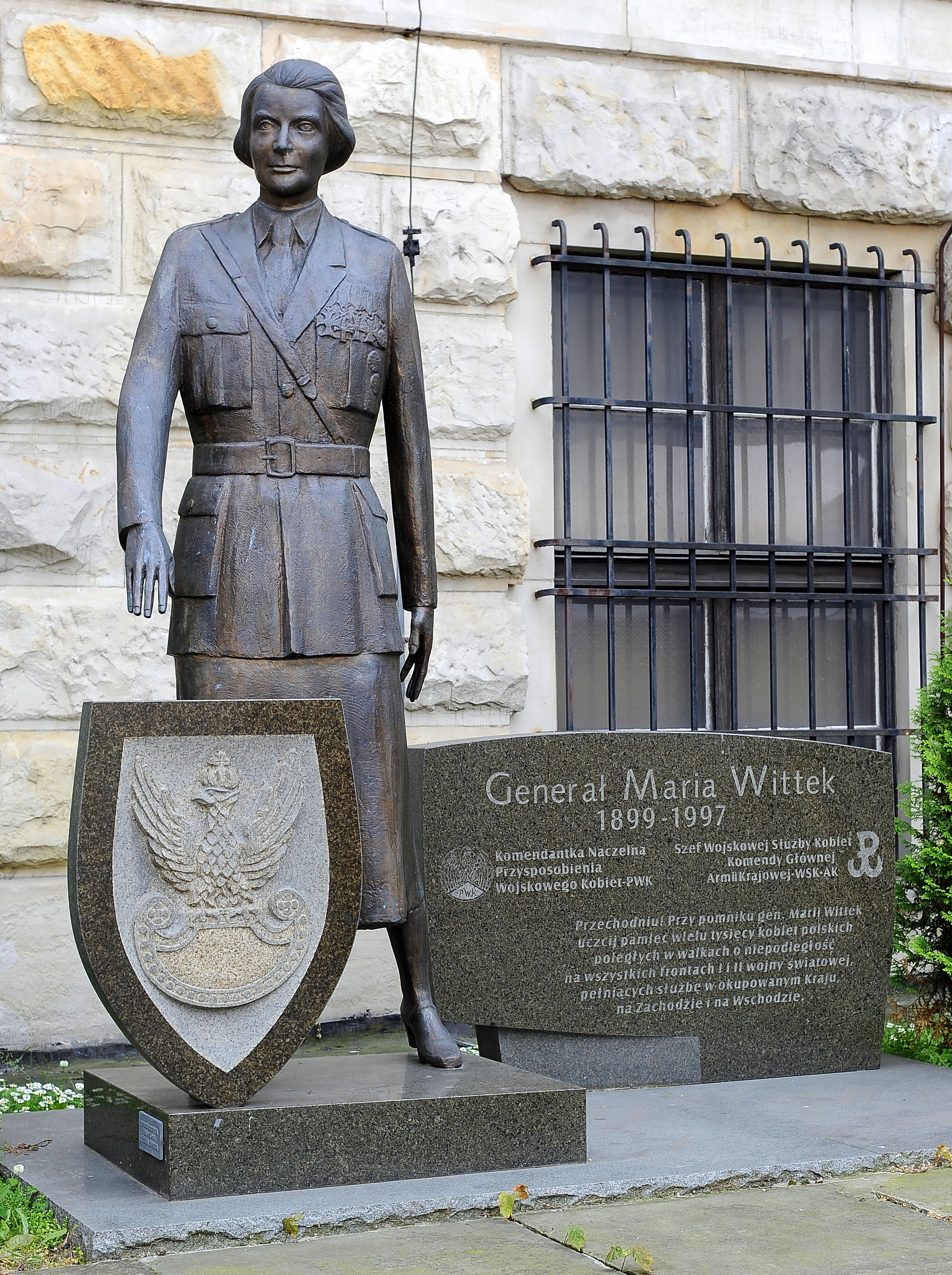
Monument of Maria Wittek at the Military Museum in Warsaw

== After the war ==
When the communist government of Poland reopened the Institute of Physical Education and Military Training, she initially returned to her previous position as head of the women's division. However, in 1949 she was arrested by the communist authorities and spent several months in prison. After her release she worked in a newspaper kiosk. She initiated the establishment of the "Commission for the History of Women". After the collapse of communist rule in Poland, President Lech Wałęsa appointed her brigadier general on May 2, 1991. Thus she became the first Polish woman to attain the rank of general. She never married.

On 19 April 2007, the 10th anniversary of her death, a life-size bronze monument of her was unveiled at the Polish Army Museum in Warsaw.

== Awards ==
- Silver Cross of the Virtuti Militari, - twice
- Cross of Independence with Swords, (Krzyż Niepodległości)
- Cross of Valour (Krzyż Walecznych)
- Warsaw Cross of the Uprising

== See also ==
- Wanda Gertz
- List of Poles
- Halszka Wasilewska (soldier)
- Elżbieta Zawacka
