= Halszka Wasilewska (soldier) =

Polish military person

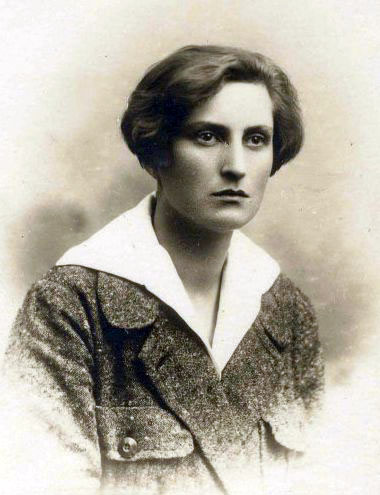
- Wasilewska c. 1918
- Born: 21 March 1899 at sea, registered in London, England
- Died: 8 February 1961 (aged 61); Stafford, England
- Burial place: Stafford Cemetery, Eccleshall Road, Stafford, England
- Relatives: Leon Wasilewski, Wanda Wasilewska
- Military career
- Allegiance: Poland
- Branch: Polish Legions; Ochotnicza Legia Kobiet; Polish Land Forces
- Service years: 1918 – 1949
- Rank: Major
- Unit: Przysposobienie Wojskowe Kobiet
- Commands: Ochotnicza Legia Kobiet; Commandant; Brigade II of the Polish Legions; Commandant of Przysposobienie Wojskowe Kobiet
- Conflicts: World War I Polish–Ukrainian War; Battle of Lwów; Polish–Soviet War; World War II
- Awards: Commemorative Medal for War 1939–1945
- Other work: Commander Polish Women's Army Auxiliary Corps, Germany

Halszka Wasilewska, sometimes called Halina, (21 March 1899 – 8 February 1961), WW2 nom-de-guerre Krystyna, was one of the first women to attain the rank of Major in the Polish Armed Forces.

She was a Legionnaire in the First World War and the subsequent Polish-Soviet War in 1920. She participated in the battle for Lwów and in the Polish-Ukrainian War. As an officer, she had special responsibility for training in the women's Polish Armed Forces during the interbellum. With the outbreak of the Second World War, she directed training for the women in the Polish Underground Army. She was captured and tortured by the Nazis and held in Ravensbrück concentration camp for two years. After liberation she rose to the rank of Major of the Women's forces in General Maczek's 1st Armoured Division in postwar Germany.

She was the elder sister of the communist activist Wanda Wasilewska, who has overshadowed her in history.

== Early life and education ==
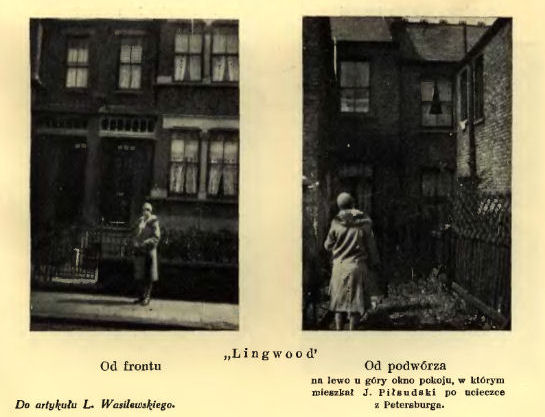
"Lingwood", Leytonstone in 1898 where Halszka spent her earliest years

Halszka was first of the three daughters of Wanda (née Zieleniewska) and her husband, Leon Wasilewski, later to be first foreign minister of the Second Republic of Poland. Her father, who originally came from the Polish community in Saint Petersburg, met his future wife, Wanda, at Lwów University where they were both students. He dropped out of his course and became involved in the Polish independence movement, setting up his own "university programme", in the words of his biographer, Stoczewska. After meeting Józef Piłsudski in the mid 1890s, he joined the Polish Socialist Party and became an activist. The movement operated across international frontiers with its main groupings centred at the time on Zürich and London. Wasilewski became the editor of the Whitechapel-based political review, "Przedświt" ("Pre-Dawn"). He and his wife lived in Leytonstone between 1898 and 1903 in a house called "Lingwood", where many leading Polish activists would meet and where Piłsudski stayed after his escape from St. Petersburg.

Halszka Wasilewska was born on board a Tilbury-bound ship as her parents were returning home from a European trip and her birth was registered in London. She spent her early childhood in the tightly-knit Polish community of political activists in London. After her father was recalled back to mainland Europe in 1903, prior to the 1905 Russian Revolution and the Polish insurrection of that year, the family left England and went to Galicia, but first to Vienna then to Kraków where Halszka spent the rest of her childhood and where her two younger sisters, Wanda and Zofia Aldona were born.

Wasilewska went on to Jan Kazimierz University in Lwów, her parents' Alma mater, completing course work in Philosophy to gain an Absolutorium, without collecting her degree. She then did a specialism in biology and became a teacher in a girls' gymnasium in Lwów. Her married name was Niemiec.

== World War I ==
After the outbreak of the First World War, Wasilewska served in the medical corps of the Polish Legion Brigade in Jabłonkowo, in Kęty, Galicia and in Vienna. In 1918 she was a courier for the 2nd command of the Polish Military Organisation (Komenda Naczelna 2 Polskiej Organizacji Wojskowej) in Kraków. Dressed as a man, she took part in the defence of Lwów as a communications officer of company 5 of the Legions. She was one of three women, dressed as men, who were "embedded" in the artillery forces of Poland; the other two were Maria Wittek, later commander of women's land forces who advanced to Brigadier general and Major Wanda "Kazik" Gertz, a highly decorated officer for her valour. Piłsudski was keen that women should play their part in the military. All three were sent for officer training alongside their male counterparts to Komorowo. Subsequently, she fought against Ukrainian forces as commander of the communications patrol. A serious lung illness prevented her fighting physically against the Bolsheviks.

After hostilities ended she was one of the regional organisers of the PWK - Przysposobienie Wojskowe Kobiet (Female Military Training). 1928-1934 saw her as the commander of the Lwów PWK and simultaneously, as manager of the Polish forces' physical training for Lwów. In September 1939 she was chief of the Women's Battalion of auxiliary forces for the Lwów National Defence Brigade.

== World War II ==
In September 1939 Wasilewska commanded a women's battalion in the defence of Lwów, supported by Maria Wittek, until Lwów's capitulation to the Soviet Red Army. In October 1939 she was sworn into the underground forces in Lwów. Later that month she became head of the training Centre of the Polish Women's underground forces in Warsaw. In 1941 she was head of women's underground forces training in Warsaw. She was arrested early in 1943 by the Gestapo and imprisoned in the Pawiak prison. On 3 April 1943 she was transferred to Ravensbrűck concentration camp. After Liberation, in May 1945 she was sent to Sweden for medical treatment. She later assumed command of the 2nd Battalion of the Women's Army Service in Meppen, Germany with the 1st Armoured Division headed by General Maczek. She arrived in the United Kingdom with her regiment where it was demobilised.

== New career after the war ==
Wasilewska initially stayed in London and was subsequently located at "Ontario" resettlement camp in Shropshire, then moved to the Women's Allied Forces hostel in Claverley from where she was finally demobilised. She settled in the nearby town of Stafford. She completed a graphic design course; Maria Szymkiewicz reports she always had a talent for drawing. She worked on the design of commercial advertisements. In her spare time she undertook the preparation of an atlas of Polish historical maps. It is unknown whether that project was completed before her death. It is worth noting in this context that her younger sister, Wanda, is said to have assisted Stalin in the drawing up of Poland's "new" eastern borders after World War II, a change of the very frontiers that their father, Leon, as the first Foreign Minister of independent Poland, had helped to negotiate in 1920–21.

Halszka Wasilewska died in Stafford in 1961 where she was buried in the town cemetery in Eccleshall Road.

== Awards ==
Wasilewska was awarded:

- Cross of Independence
- Cross of Valour, twice
- War Medal 1939–1945

== See also ==
- Poles in the United Kingdom
- Maria Wittek
- Wanda Gertz
