= Republic of Wędziagoła =

Republic of Wędziagoła Republika Wędziagolska (Polish)
- 1918–1919
- Status: Unrecognized quasi-state
- Capital: Vandžiogala
- Common languages: Polish
- Religion: Catholicism
- Historical era: Interwar period
  - Established: 1918
  - Re-incorporation into Lithuania: 1919
Preceded by	Succeeded by
Lithuania	Lithuania
- Today part of: Lithuania

The Republic of Wędziagoła (Polish: Republika Wędziagolska; Lithuanian: Vandžiogalos Respublika) was a short-lived unrecognized quasi-state in the Liauda region, centred around the village of Vandžiogala (Polish: Wędziagoła) near Kaunas in Lithuania. It existed from 1918 to 1919. The state was established by Polish local figures who opposed the creation of an independent Lithuania.

== Background ==
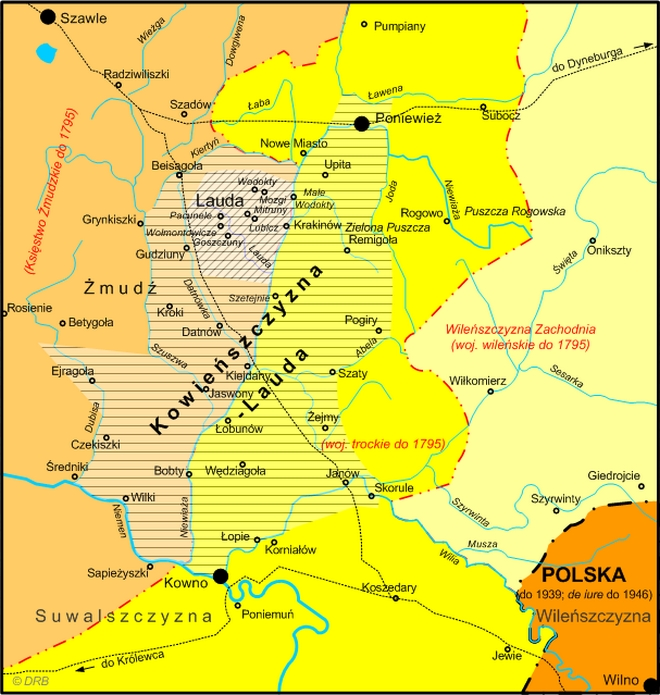
Approximate map of the Liauda (Lauda), including larger (horizontal lines) and smaller (skewed lines) areas defined as the region.

The region of Liauda is first mentioned in historical sources in 1372 as one of the territories pillaged by the Livonian Order, and is named after the Liaudė river. The region was settled with lower Lithuanian nobility by Vytautas the Great in the late 14th century to fortify the region against Livonian raids. It had a high number of okolica szlachecka (Lithuanian: bajorkaimis), which were villages inhabited by petty nobility. Many of the region's inhabitants were gradually Polonized by the end of the 18th century.

According to the 1897 Russian Empire census, 23.2% of the population of Kovensky Uyezd, encompassing Kaunas and the surrounding territories of Liauda, including Vandžiogala, was Polish, and 35.7% was Lithuanian. Antagonism between the Polish and Lithuanian communities increased with the Lithuanian National Revival. Lithuanian nationalists treated the Polish-speaking population of Liauda as assimilated Lithuanians and described it as "our Polonized corner". Meanwhile, Polish Military Organisation units were established in Liauda, led by Halena Skirgajło-Jagiełłowicz (Lithuanian: Elena Skirgailaitė-Jagelavičienė), noblewoman and Vandžiogala parish housekeeper.

== Establishment ==
After the Armistice of Compiegne on 11 November 1918, the government of Lithuania proclaimed a local government law and required inhabitants of local communities to elect local committees. While some of the inhabitants of the Liauda region chose to cooperate, others ignored the proclamation and established their own Parish People's Committee (Polish: Parafialny Komitet Ludowy, Lithuanian: Parapijinis liaudies komitetas) in Vandžiogala. Local government institutions and a militia were being established and proclamation calling for the region's inhabitants to join the Polish Army were published.

The goal of the quasi-state was the creation of a joint Polish-Lithuanian state. It refused to recognize the Lithuanian government, pay taxes, send soldiers to the Lithuanian Army or follow Lithuanian laws. The existence of the state was first brought to attention by Rapolas Skipitis, who worked in Kaunas as a judge and received a request from Vandžiogala to receive documents in the Polish language, rather than Lithuanian, otherwise their orders will not be followed. Skipitis informed Juozas Mikuckis, the military commander of Kaunas, who arrived to Vandžiogala with 100 men. The Lithuanian soldiers were attacked by the town militia, which caused a skirmish and led to several injuries. After the revolt was quelled, the Polish institutions in Vandžiogala were disestablished and Lithuanian officials were appointed in their stead.

== Aftermath ==
It was one of several short-lived "republics" established in Lithuanian territory after November 1918. Similar short-lived entities were established in Babtai, Varviškė, and in other places in Kaunas, Kėdainiai, Ukmergė and Panevėžys districts.

Administration and document writing in the Lithuanian language in Vandžiogala was only established in 1923. Polish language education and press were banned, Lithuanian teachers, officials and police officers were sent to Vandžiogala, a modern school was established in 1932 which did not offer education in the Polish language. Underground Pochodnia schools were established by the local inhabitants, but were persecuted and lacked funding and thus were short-lived.

Many of the Polish inhabitants of Vandžiogala and the rest of Liauda repatriated to Poland after World War II. 7.8% of the inhabitants of the Vandžiogala eldership identified themselves as Polish in the 2001 census.

== See also ==
- Vilnius Region
- Suwałki Region
