= Liauda =

Historical region in Lithuania

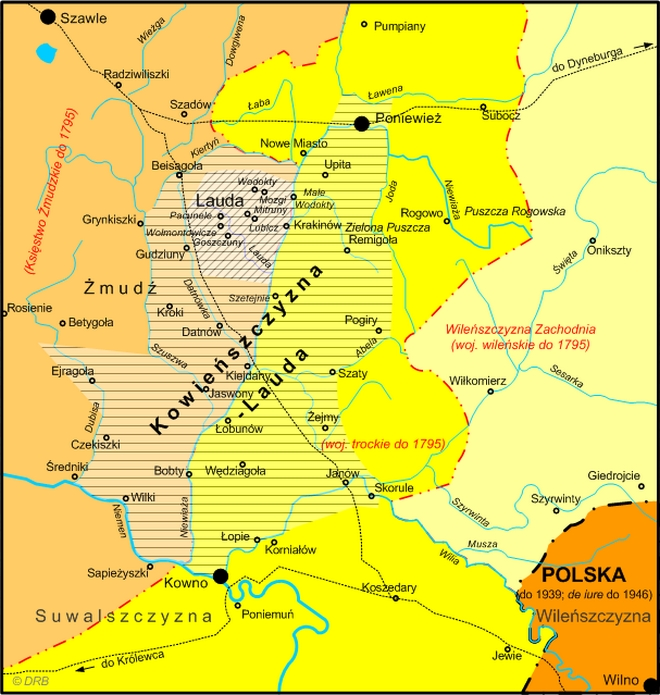
Approximate map of the Lauda, including larger (horizontal lines) and smaller (skewed lines) areas defined as the region.

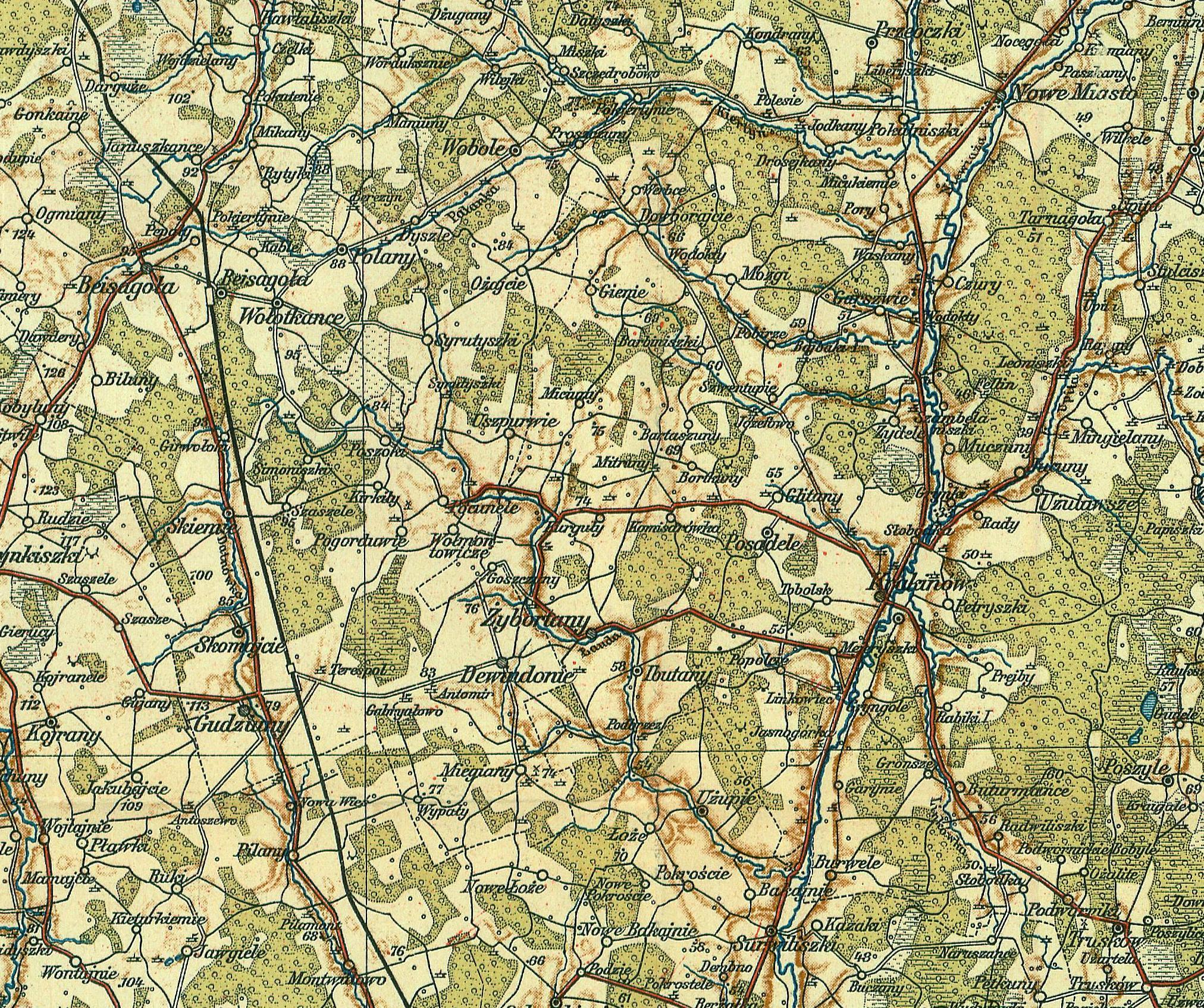
Map of Minor Liauda from 1912.

Liauda, (Note: Polish: Lauda) also known as Kaunas Region, (Note: Polish: Kowieńszczyzna) is a historical region centred around Liaudė river on the north from city of Kaunas, and located between Nemunas, Neris and Dubysa rivers. The region is located within modern borders of Lithuania. It borders historical regions of Samogitia, Suvalkija and Vilnius. Its area is approximately 6500 km^{2} (2509.7 square miles).

The region's borders are characterized by place names ending in -gala, such as Ariogala, Betygala, Baisogala, Gimbogala, Ramygala, Vandžiogala.

The Lithuanian signatory of Act of the Re-Establishment of the State of Lithuania, Algirdas Vaclovas Patackas states that three important persons of Lithuanian history originated from Liauda: Mikalojus Daukša, Czesław Miłosz, and Józef Piłsudski.

It was the site of an attempt to create an independent pro-Polish Republic of Vandžiogala in 1918.

== See also ==
- Vilnius Region
- Suwałki Region

== Bibliography ==
- Mitkiewicz, L. (1990). Wspomnienia kowieńskie 1938–1939 (in Polish). Warsaw.
- Buchowski, K. (1999). Polacy w niepodległym państwie litewskim 1918-1940 (in Polish). Białystok.
