= Józef Gołuchowski =

Polish philosopher (1797 – 1858)

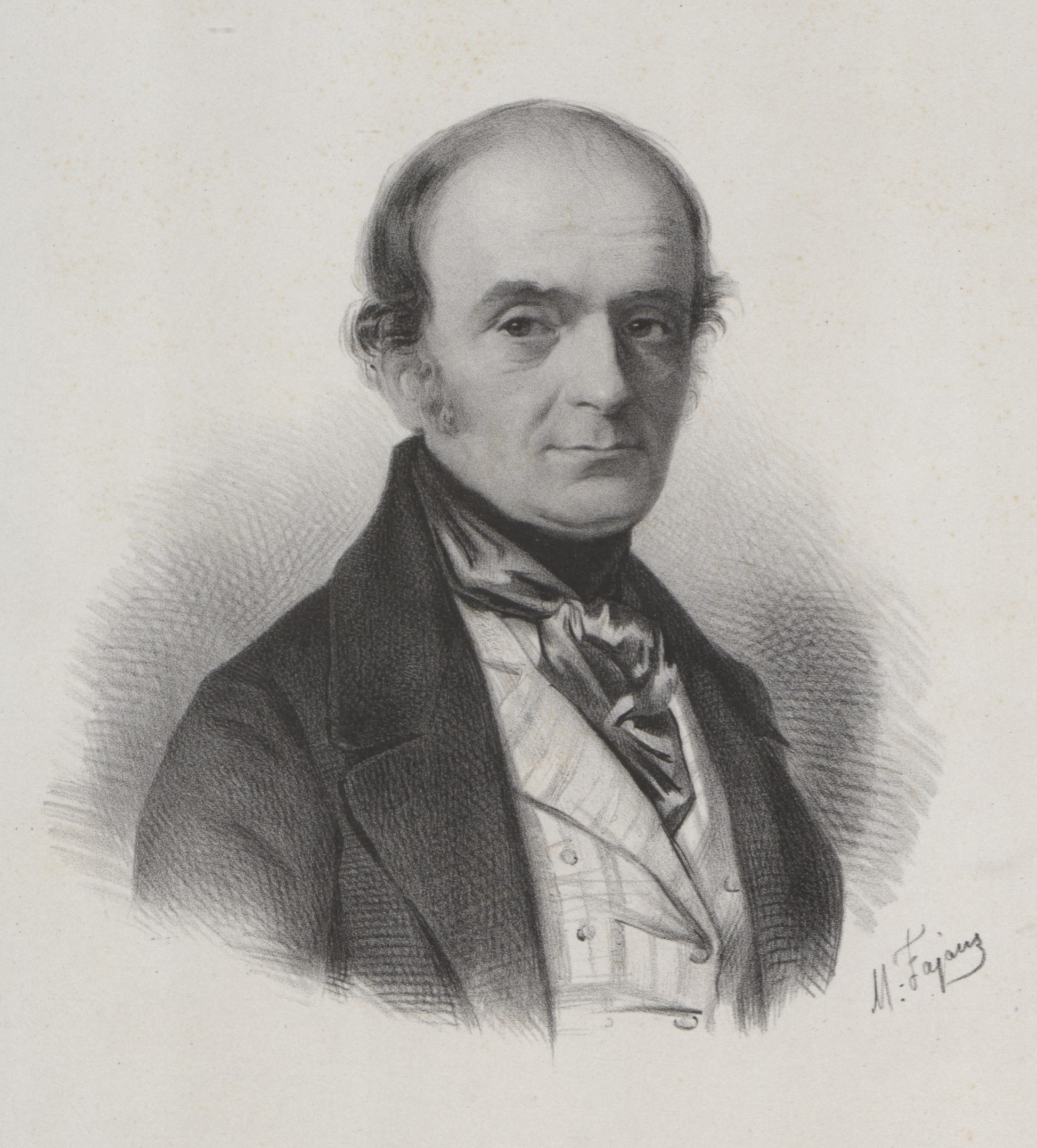
- Portrait of Gołuchowski by Maksymilian Fajans
- Born: 11 April 1797; Łączki Kucharskie
- Died: 22 November 1858 (aged 61); Garbacz

Academic background
- Education: University of Warsaw; Heidelberg University

Józef Wojciech Gołuchowski (Polish: [ɡɔwuˈxɔfskʲi]; 11 April 1797 – 22 November 1858) was a Polish philosopher. A professor at Vilnius University, he was co-creator of the Polish Romanticist "national philosophy."

He preached the concept of the nation as a creation of God, with a peculiar "national spirit," that realized the ideal of a hierarchical society in which each individual is a necessary fragment of the whole. He opposed 18th-century materialist philosophy from an irrationalist position. In the theory of knowledge, he preached the primacy of feeling and intuition over reason.

== Biography ==
Gołuchowski was born in Łączki Kucharskie. After completing elementary school at Tyniec, he began attending the Theresian Military Academy in 1809. He began studying mathematics in the Academy's philosophy after completing a 7-year grammar school, completing his studies at the Academy in 1816 after writing an essay and passing an exam in "lesser and higher mathematics". In July 1817, he moved to Warsaw and applied to be chairman of "intermediate mathematics" at the recently established University of Warsaw; having been rejected, he enrolled in its Faculty of Law and Administration. He tried to apply for an associate professorship in philosophy at the same University a year later, and was again rejected, this time for not having a magister degree. Given this, he accepted a position at the Warsaw Lyceum, where he taught mathematics and the Greek language.

On 18 July 1820, Gołuchowski was awarded a magister degree in law and administration from the University of Warsaw. He began working as a magister legens (equivalent to the position of Privatdozent) at the University later the same year. Gołuchowski was awarded a doctorate in philosophy from Jagiellonian University on 27 May 1821 — though without a diploma — and was awarded another doctorate in philosophy from Heidelberg University on 12 August 1821, after writing two dissertations on moral philosophy and on the Republic, respectively. He was then nominated as an associate professor of the University of Warsaw on 30 December 1822; before this, he was elected chair of philosophy at the University of Vilnius on 13 June 1821, with the University's Council voting 13–1 on his nomination. After staying in Paris and studying at Erlangen and Heidelberg, Gołuchowski assumed the chairmanship at the University of Vilnius on 27 October 1823. He would lecture on anthropology, logic, and moral philosophy.

The popularity of Gołuchowski's lectures drew the attention of Russian authorities, who were conducting an investigation into students in Vilnius. On 29 January 1824, his lectures were suspended at the request of Nikolay Novosiltsev, who presented Gołuchowski as a "dangerous man" that sought to create a national philosophy, which he believed explained his lectures' popularity. Gołuchowski was formally dismissed from the University of Vilnius in August 1824; in the meanwhile, he returned to Warsaw, becoming a corresponding member of the Warsaw Society of Friends of Learning on 7 March 1824. In 1826, Gołuchowski gave up his studies, settling down in Garbacz to pursue farm work. He married Magdaleną Gołuchowska, his brother's widow, in 1830. At the outbreak of the November Uprising, he went back to Warsaw to give some lectures, for which he was arrested in 1835 and imprisoned for 5 months at the Royal Castle. Gołuchowski died on 22 November 1858 in Garbacz, and was buried in the crypt of the Church of Saint Adalbert in Momina.

== See also ==
- History of philosophy in Poland
- List of Poles
