= Wymysłów, Ostrowiec County =

Wymysłów
- Village
- Location within Poland
- Coordinates: 50°58′13″N 21°20′25″E
- Country: Poland
- Voivodeship: Świętokrzyskie
- County: Ostrowiec
- Gmina: Kunów
- Population: 430

Wymysłów [vɨˈmɨswuf] is a village in the administrative district of Gmina Kunów, within Ostrowiec County, Świętokrzyskie Voivodeship, in south-central Poland. It lies approximately 5 km (3 mi) east of Kunów, 6 km (4 mi) north-west of Ostrowiec Świętokrzyski, and 52 km (32 mi) east of the regional capital Kielce.
