= Fornalski =

Fornalski, feminine: Fornalska is a Polish occupational surname, an adjective from the word fornal, "coachman", "carter". Notable people with the surname include:

- Feliksa Fornalska (1893–1987), Polish communist revolutionary and politician
- Franciszek Fornalski (1781–1863), Polish soldier during Napoleonic Wars
- Franciszek Kacper Fornalski (1807–1850), Polish officer during the November Uprising
- Małgorzata Fornalska (1902–1944), Polish anti-Nazi resistance fighter
