= Kolonia Piaski, Świętokrzyskie Voivodeship =

Kolonia Piaski
- Village
- Location within Poland
- Coordinates: 50°58′23″N 21°17′6″E
- Country: Poland
- Voivodeship: Świętokrzyskie
- County: Ostrowiec
- Gmina: Kunów
- Population: 257

Kolonia Piaski (Polish pronunciation: [kɔˈlɔɲa ˈpjaskʲi]) is a village in the administrative district of Gmina Kunów, within Ostrowiec County, Świętokrzyskie Voivodeship, in south-central Poland. It lies approximately 2 km (1 mi) north of Kunów, 10 km (6 mi) north-west of Ostrowiec Świętokrzyski, and 48 km (30 mi) east of the regional capital Kielce.
