= Janik, Poland =

Janik
- Village
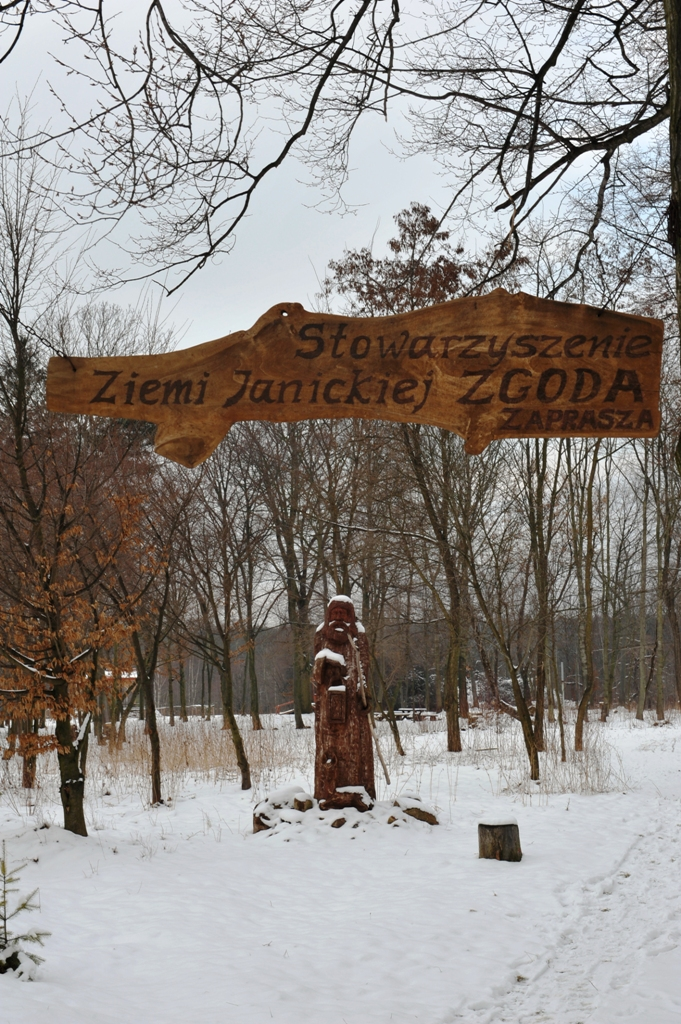

- Location within Poland
- Coordinates: 50°58′28″N 21°19′11″E
- Country: Poland
- Voivodeship: Świętokrzyskie
- County: Ostrowiec
- Gmina: Kunów
- Population: 1,024

Janik [ˈjanik] is a village in the administrative district of Gmina Kunów, within Ostrowiec County, Świętokrzyskie Voivodeship, in south-central Poland. It lies approximately 4 km (2 mi) north-east of Kunów, 8 km (5 mi) north-west of Ostrowiec Świętokrzyski, and 51 km (32 mi) east of the regional capital Kielce.
