= Jeżów, Ostrowiec County =

Jeżów
- Village
- Location within Poland
- Coordinates: 50°51′52″N 21°12′51″E
- Country: Poland
- Voivodeship: Świętokrzyskie
- County: Ostrowiec
- Gmina: Waśniów
- Population: 240

Jeżów [ˈjɛʐuf] is a village in the administrative district of Gmina Waśniów, within Ostrowiec County, Świętokrzyskie Voivodeship, in south-central Poland. It lies approximately 4 km (2 mi) south of Waśniów, 16 km (10 mi) south-west of Ostrowiec Świętokrzyski, and 43 km (27 mi) east of the regional capital Kielce.
