= Prawęcin =

- Village
- Location within Poland
- Coordinates: 50°57′6″N 21°14′21″E
- Country: Poland
- Voivodeship: Świętokrzyskie
- County: Ostrowiec
- Gmina: Kunów
- Population: 292

Prawęcin [praˈvɛnt͡ɕin] is a village in the administrative district of Gmina Kunów, within Ostrowiec County, Świętokrzyskie Voivodeship, in south-central Poland. It lies approximately 4 km (2 mi) west of Kunów, 12 km (7 mi) west of Ostrowiec Świętokrzyski, and 45 km (28 mi) east of the regional capital Kielce.
