= Chocimów =

- Village
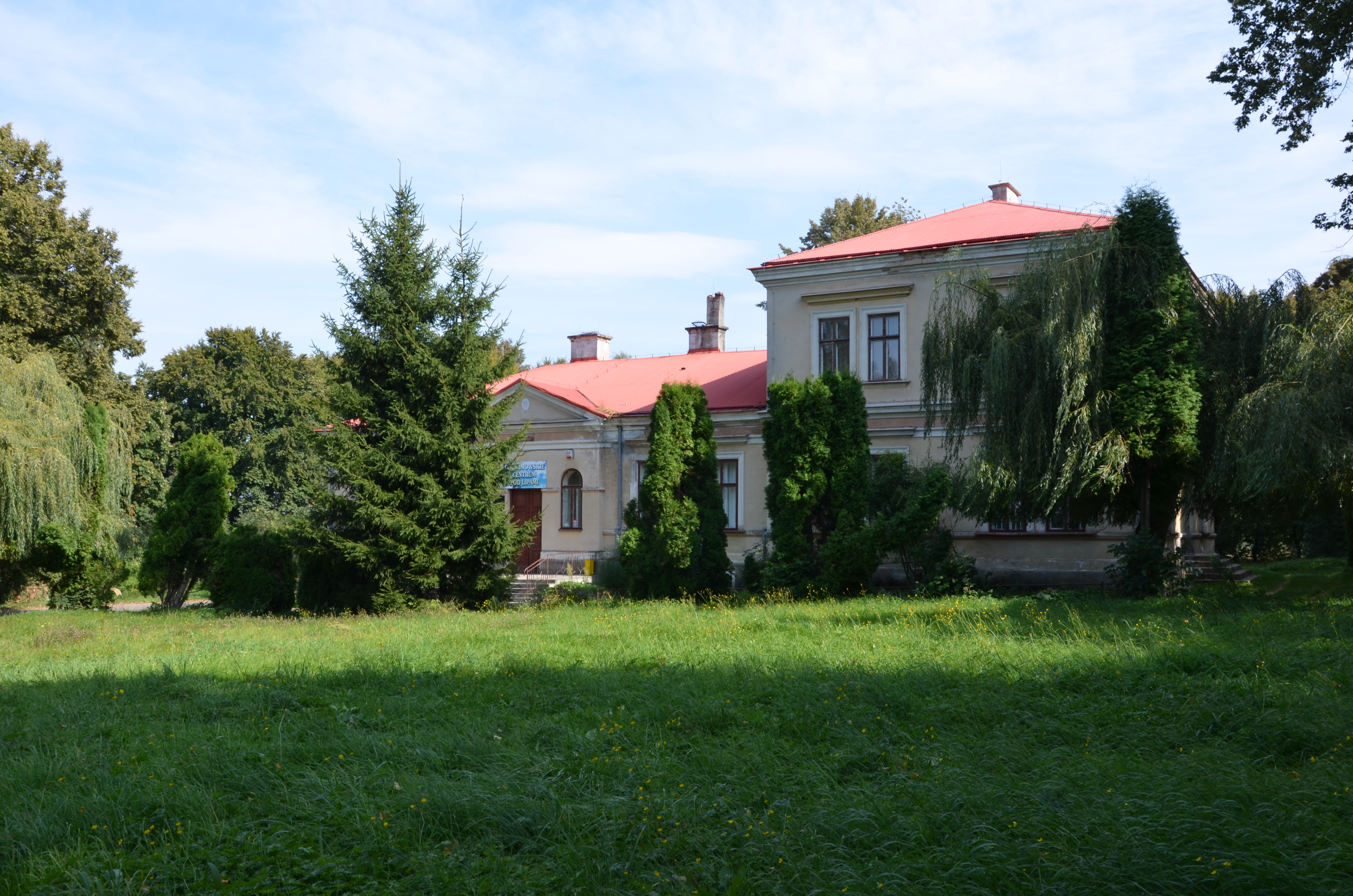
- Manor in the village

- Location within Poland
- Coordinates: 50°56′20″N 21°14′37″E
- Country: Poland
- Voivodeship: Świętokrzyskie
- County: Ostrowiec
- Gmina: Kunów

Population
  - Total: 336

Chocimów [xɔˈt͡ɕimuf] is a village in the administrative district of Gmina Kunów, within Ostrowiec County, Świętokrzyskie Voivodeship, in south-central Poland. It lies approximately 4 km (2 mi) south-west of Kunów, 11 km (7 mi) west of Ostrowiec Świętokrzyski, and 45 km (28 mi) east of the regional capital Kielce.
