= Rudka, Ostrowiec County =

Rudka
- Village
- Location within Poland
- Coordinates: 50°56′58″N 21°18′40″E
- Country: Poland
- Voivodeship: Świętokrzyskie
- County: Ostrowiec
- Gmina: Kunów
- Population: 416

Rudka [ˈrutka] is a village in the administrative district of Gmina Kunów, within Ostrowiec County, Świętokrzyskie Voivodeship, in south-central Poland. It lies approximately 3 km (2 mi) south-east of Kunów, 7 km (4 mi) west of Ostrowiec Świętokrzyski, and 50 km (31 mi) east of the regional capital Kielce.
