= Worowice, Świętokrzyskie Voivodeship =

Worowice
- Village
- Location within Poland
- Coordinates: 50°51′6″N 21°15′17″E
- Country: Poland
- Voivodeship: Mazowieckie
- County: Płock
- Gmina: Bulkowo
- Population: 130

Worowice [vɔrɔˈvit͡sɛ] is a village in the administrative district of Gmina Waśniów, within Ostrowiec County, Mazowieckie Voivodeship, in south-central Poland. It lies approximately 6 km (4 mi) south-east of Waśniów, 14 km (9 mi) south-west of Ostrowiec Świętokrzyski, and 45 km (28 mi) east of the regional capital Kielce.
