= Kotarszyn =

- Village
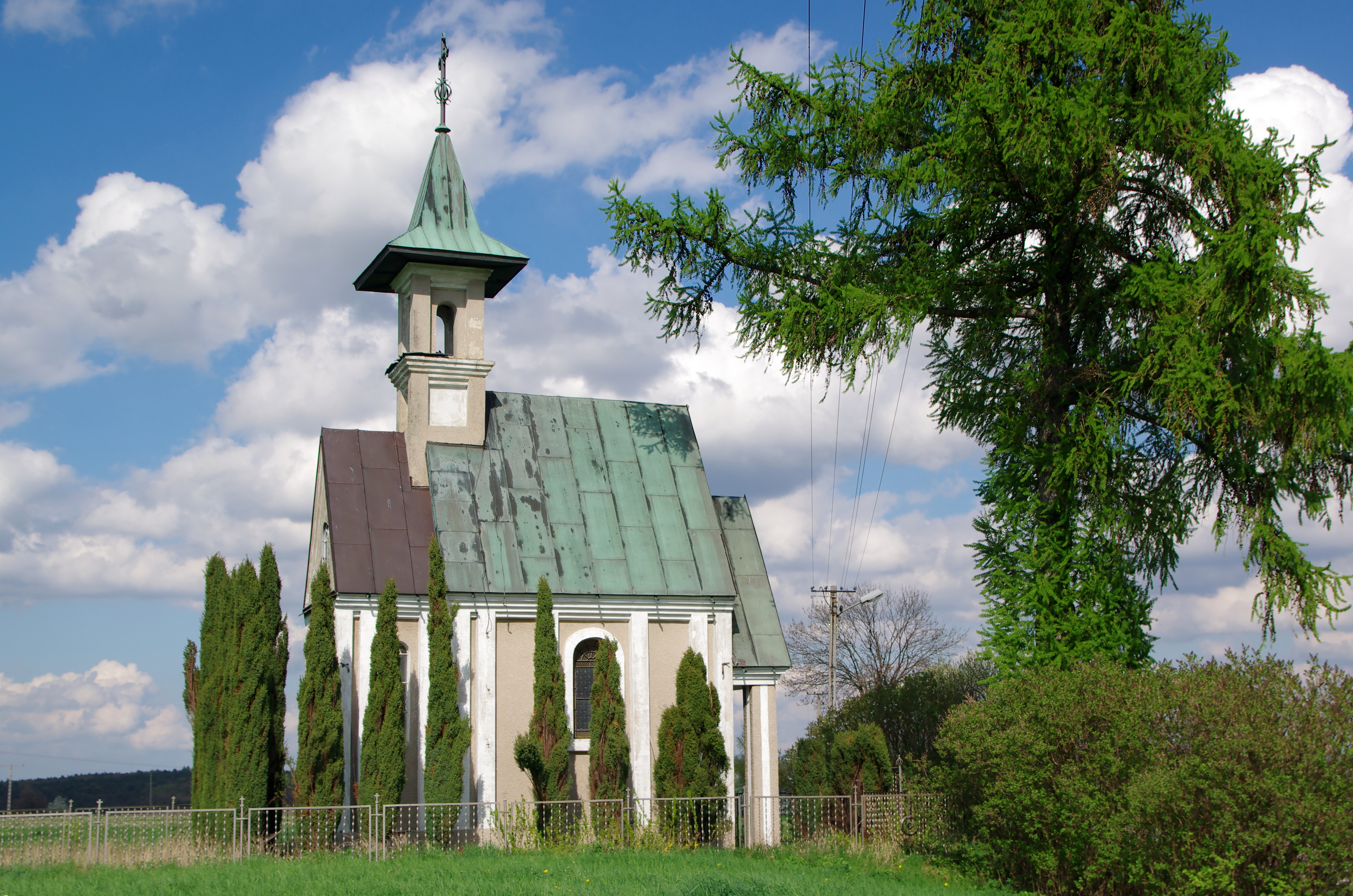
- Chapel in the village

- Location within Poland
- Coordinates: 50°56′19″N 21°11′45″E
- Country: Poland
- Voivodeship: Świętokrzyskie
- County: Ostrowiec
- Gmina: Waśniów

Population
  - Total: 250

Kotarszyn [kɔˈtarʂɨn] is a village in the administrative district of Gmina Waśniów, within Ostrowiec County, Świętokrzyskie Voivodeship, in south-central Poland. It lies approximately 5 km (3 mi) north-west of Waśniów, 15 km (9 mi) west of Ostrowiec Świętokrzyski, and 42 km (26 mi) east of the regional capital Kielce.
