= Boksycka =

- Village
- Location within Poland
- Coordinates: 50°57′0″N 21°19′55″E
- Country: Poland
- Voivodeship: Świętokrzyskie
- County: Ostrowiec
- Gmina: Kunów
- Population: 1,454

Boksycka [bɔkˈsɨt͡ska] is a village in the administrative district of Gmina Kunów, within Ostrowiec County, Świętokrzyskie Voivodeship, in south-central Poland. It lies approximately 4 km (2 mi) east of Kunów, 6 km (4 mi) west of Ostrowiec Świętokrzyski, and 51 km (32 mi) east of the regional capital Kielce.
