= Boksyce =

- Village
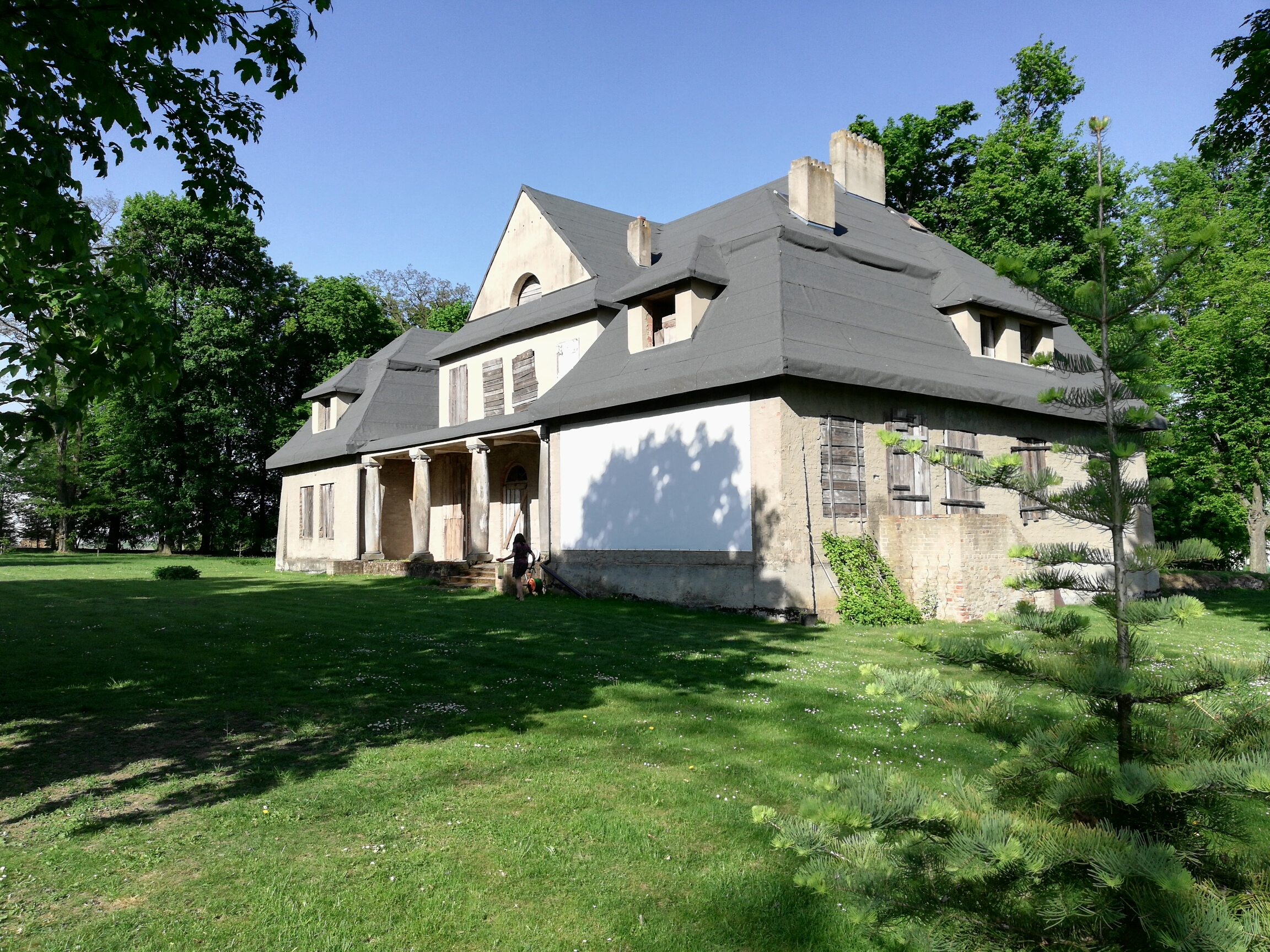
- Manor

- Location within Poland
- Coordinates: 50°52′49″N 21°15′12″E
- Country: Poland
- Voivodeship: Świętokrzyskie
- County: Ostrowiec
- Gmina: Waśniów
- Population: 160

Boksyce [bɔkˈsɨt͡sɛ] is a village in the administrative district of Gmina Waśniów, within Ostrowiec County, Świętokrzyskie Voivodeship, in south-central Poland. It lies approximately 3 km (2 mi) south-east of Waśniów, 12 km (7 mi) south-west of Ostrowiec Świętokrzyski, and 45 km (28 mi) east of the regional capital Kielce.
