= Udziców =

- Village
- Location within Poland
- Coordinates: 50°56′49″N 21°17′50″E
- Country: Poland
- Voivodeship: Świętokrzyskie
- County: Ostrowiec
- Gmina: Kunów
- Population: 113

Udziców [uˈd͡ʑit͡suf] is a village in the administrative district of Gmina Kunów, within Ostrowiec County, Świętokrzyskie Voivodeship, in south-central Poland. It lies approximately 2 km (1 mi) south-east of Kunów, 8 km (5 mi) west of Ostrowiec Świętokrzyski, and 49 km (30 mi) east of the regional capital Kielce.
