= Małe Jodło =

- Village
- Location within Poland
- Coordinates: 50°56′16″N 21°13′22″E
- Country: Poland
- Voivodeship: Świętokrzyskie
- County: Ostrowiec
- Gmina: Kunów
- Population: 173

Małe Jodło [ˈmawɛ ˈjɔdwɔ] is a village in the administrative district of Gmina Kunów, within Ostrowiec County, Świętokrzyskie Voivodeship, in south-central Poland. It lies approximately 5 km (3 mi) south-west of Kunów, 13 km (8 mi) west of Ostrowiec Świętokrzyski, and 43 km (27 mi) east of the regional capital Kielce.
