= Milejowice, Świętokrzyskie Voivodeship =

Milejowice
- Village
- Location within Poland
- Coordinates: 50°50′27″N 21°13′54″E
- Country: Poland
- Voivodeship: Świętokrzyskie
- County: Ostrowiec
- Gmina: Waśniów
- Population: 120

Milejowice [milɛjɔˈvit͡sɛ] is a village in the administrative district of Gmina Waśniów, within Ostrowiec County, Świętokrzyskie Voivodeship, in south-central Poland. It lies approximately 7 km (4 mi) south of Waśniów, 16 km (10 mi) south-west of Ostrowiec Świętokrzyski, and 44 km (27 mi) east of the regional capital Kielce.
