= Czażów =

- Village
- Location within Poland
- Coordinates: 50°54′27″N 21°9′57″E
- Country: Poland
- Voivodeship: Świętokrzyskie
- County: Ostrowiec
- Gmina: Waśniów
- Population: 140

Czażów [ˈt͡ʂaʐuf] is a village in the administrative district of Gmina Waśniów, within Ostrowiec County, Świętokrzyskie Voivodeship, in south-central Poland. It lies approximately 5 km (3 mi) west of Waśniów, 17 km (11 mi) west of Ostrowiec Świętokrzyski, and 39 km (24 mi) east of the regional capital Kielce.
