= Kolonia Inwalidzka =

- Village
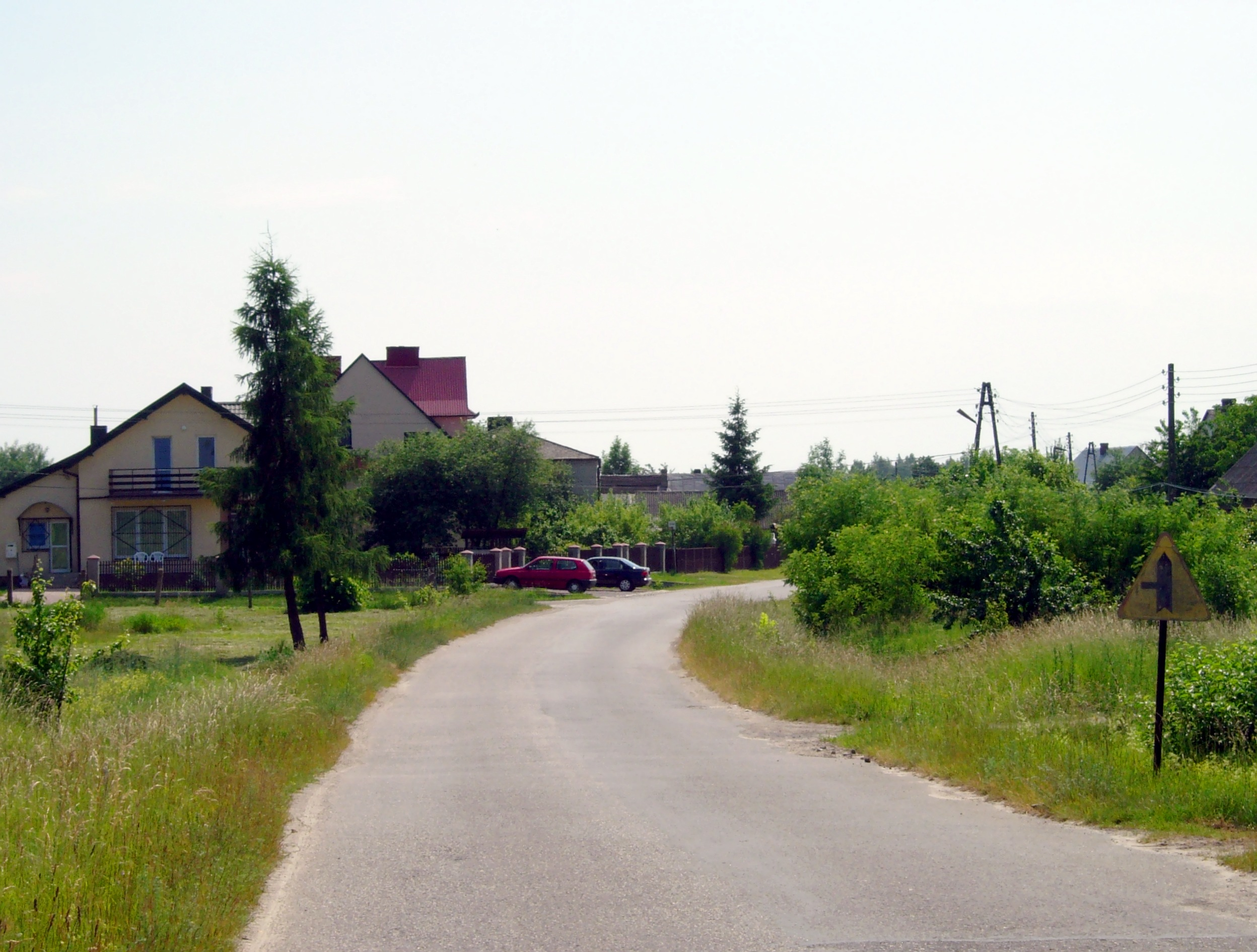

- Location within Poland
- Coordinates: 50°59′7″N 21°17′56″E
- Country: Poland
- Voivodeship: Świętokrzyskie
- County: Ostrowiec
- Gmina: Kunów
- Population: 354

Kolonia Inwalidzka [kɔˈlɔɲa invaˈlit͡ska] is a village in the administrative district of Gmina Kunów, within Ostrowiec County, Świętokrzyskie Voivodeship, in south-central Poland. It lies approximately 4 km (2 mi) north of Kunów, 10 km (6 mi) north-west of Ostrowiec Świętokrzyski, and 50 km (31 mi) east of the regional capital Kielce.
