= Pękosławice =

- Village
- Location within Poland
- Coordinates: 50°54′47″N 21°12′59″E
- Country: Poland
- Voivodeship: Świętokrzyskie
- County: Ostrowiec
- Gmina: Waśniów
- Population: 160

Pękosławice [pɛŋkɔswaˈvit͡sɛ] is a village in the administrative district of Gmina Waśniów, within Ostrowiec County, Świętokrzyskie Voivodeship, in south-central Poland. It lies approximately 2 km (1 mi) north of Waśniów, 14 km (9 mi) west of Ostrowiec Świętokrzyski, and 43 km (27 mi) east of the regional capital Kielce.
