= Stryczowice =

- Village
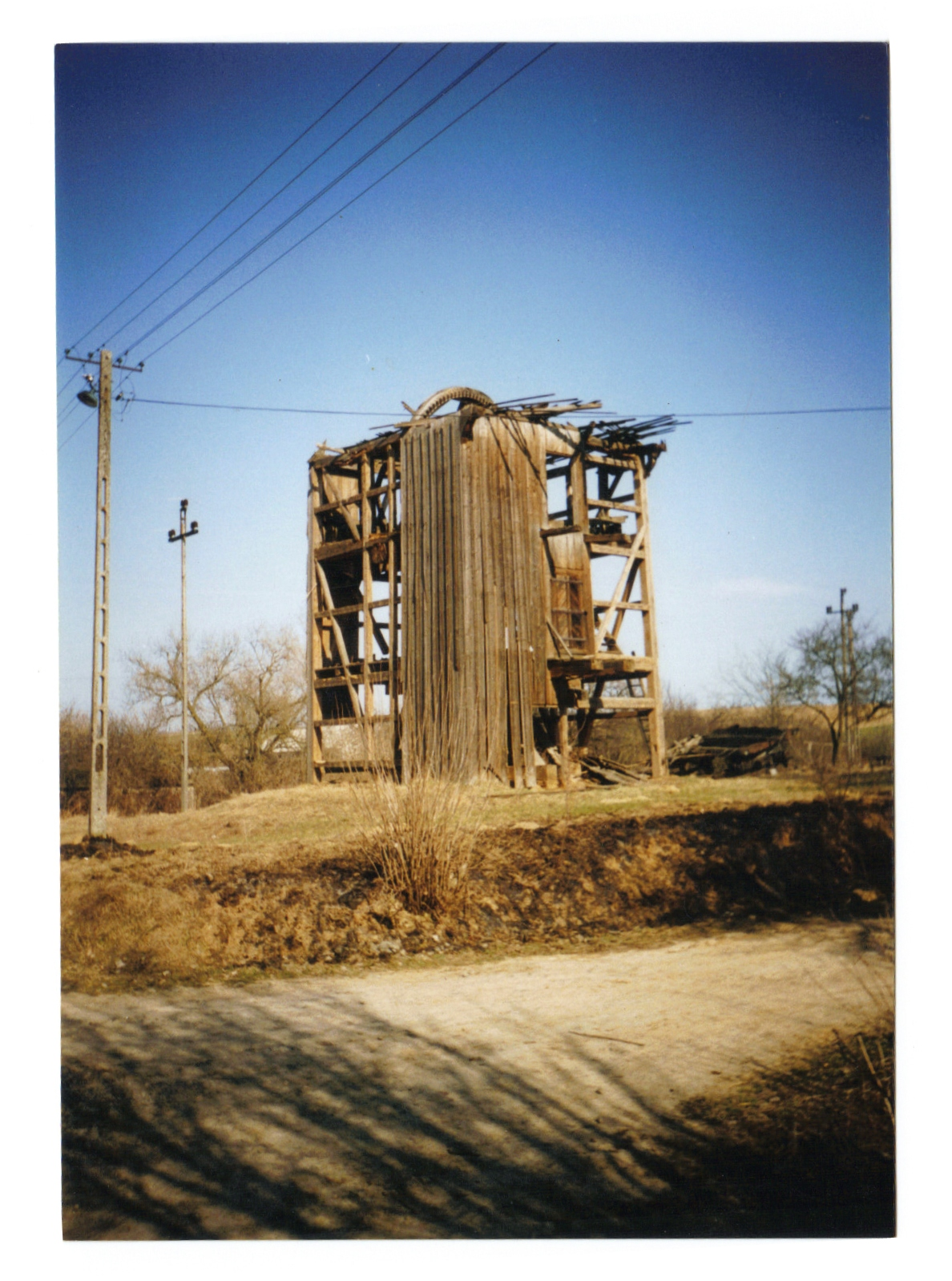

- Location within Poland
- Coordinates: 50°52′6″N 21°17′17″E
- Country: Poland
- Voivodeship: Świętokrzyskie
- County: Ostrowiec
- Gmina: Waśniów
- Population: 240

Stryczowice [strɨt͡ʂɔˈvit͡sɛ] is a village in the administrative district of Gmina Waśniów, within Ostrowiec County, Świętokrzyskie Voivodeship, in south-central Poland. It lies approximately 6 km (4 mi) south-east of Waśniów, 11 km (7 mi) south-west of Ostrowiec Świętokrzyski, and 48 km (30 mi) east of the regional capital Kielce.
