= Prusinowice, Świętokrzyskie Voivodeship =

Prusinowice
- Village
- Location within Poland
- Coordinates: 50°54′27″N 21°11′43″E
- Country: Poland
- Voivodeship: Świętokrzyskie
- County: Ostrowiec
- Gmina: Waśniów
- Population: 220

Prusinowice [pruɕinɔˈvit͡sɛ] is a village in the administrative district of Gmina Waśniów, within Ostrowiec County, Świętokrzyskie Voivodeship, in south-central Poland. It lies approximately 3 km (2 mi) north-west of Waśniów, 15 km (9 mi) west of Ostrowiec Świętokrzyski, and 41 km (25 mi) east of the regional capital Kielce.
