= Nietulisko Małe =

- Village
- Location within Poland
- Coordinates: 50°58′14″N 21°15′28″E
- Country: Poland
- Voivodeship: Świętokrzyskie
- County: Ostrowiec
- Gmina: Kunów
- Population: 537

Nietulisko Małe [ɲɛtuˈliskɔ ˈmawɛ] is a village in the administrative district of Gmina Kunów, within Ostrowiec County, Świętokrzyskie Voivodeship, in south-central Poland. It lies approximately 3 km (2 mi) north-west of Kunów, 11 km (7 mi) north-west of Ostrowiec Świętokrzyski, and 47 km (29 mi) east of the regional capital Kielce.
