= Sarnia Zwola =

- Village
- Location within Poland
- Coordinates: 50°51′49″N 21°10′1″E
- Country: Poland
- Voivodeship: Świętokrzyskie
- County: Ostrowiec
- Gmina: Waśniów
- Population: 270

Sarnia Zwola [ˈsarɲa ˈzvɔla] is a village in the administrative district of Gmina Waśniów, within Ostrowiec County, Świętokrzyskie Voivodeship, in south-central Poland. It lies approximately 6 km (4 mi) south-west of Waśniów, 19 km (12 mi) south-west of Ostrowiec Świętokrzyski, and 39 km (24 mi) east of the regional capital Kielce.
