= Janowice, Ostrowiec County =

Janowice
- Village
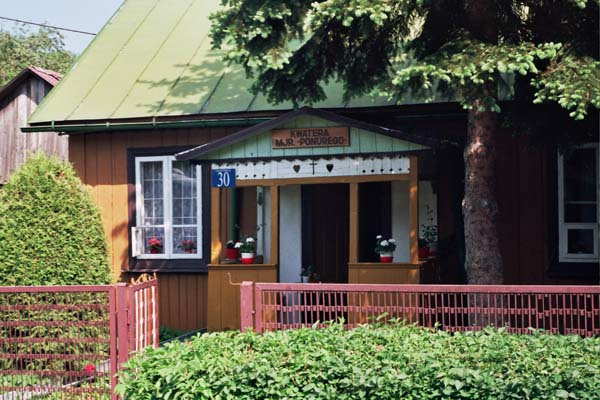
- Birthplace of Jan Piwnik

- Location within Poland
- Coordinates: 50°50′58″N 21°14′38″E
- Country: Poland
- Voivodeship: Świętokrzyskie
- County: Ostrowiec
- Gmina: Waśniów

Population
  - Total: 140

Janowice [janɔˈvit͡sɛ] is a village in the administrative district of Gmina Waśniów, within Ostrowiec County, Świętokrzyskie Voivodeship, in south-central Poland. It lies approximately 6 km (4 mi) south of Waśniów, 15 km (9 mi) south-west of Ostrowiec Świętokrzyski, and 45 km (28 mi) east of the regional capital Kielce.
