= Dobruchna =

- Village
- Location within Poland
- Coordinates: 50°52′31″N 21°10′54″E
- Country: Poland
- Voivodeship: Świętokrzyskie
- County: Ostrowiec
- Gmina: Waśniów
- Population: 250

Dobruchna [dɔˈbruxna] is a village in the administrative district of Gmina Waśniów, within Ostrowiec County, Świętokrzyskie Voivodeship, in south-central Poland. It lies approximately 4 km (2 mi) south-west of Waśniów, 17 km (11 mi) south-west of Ostrowiec Świętokrzyski, and 40 km (25 mi) east of the regional capital Kielce.
