= Mirogonowice =

- Village
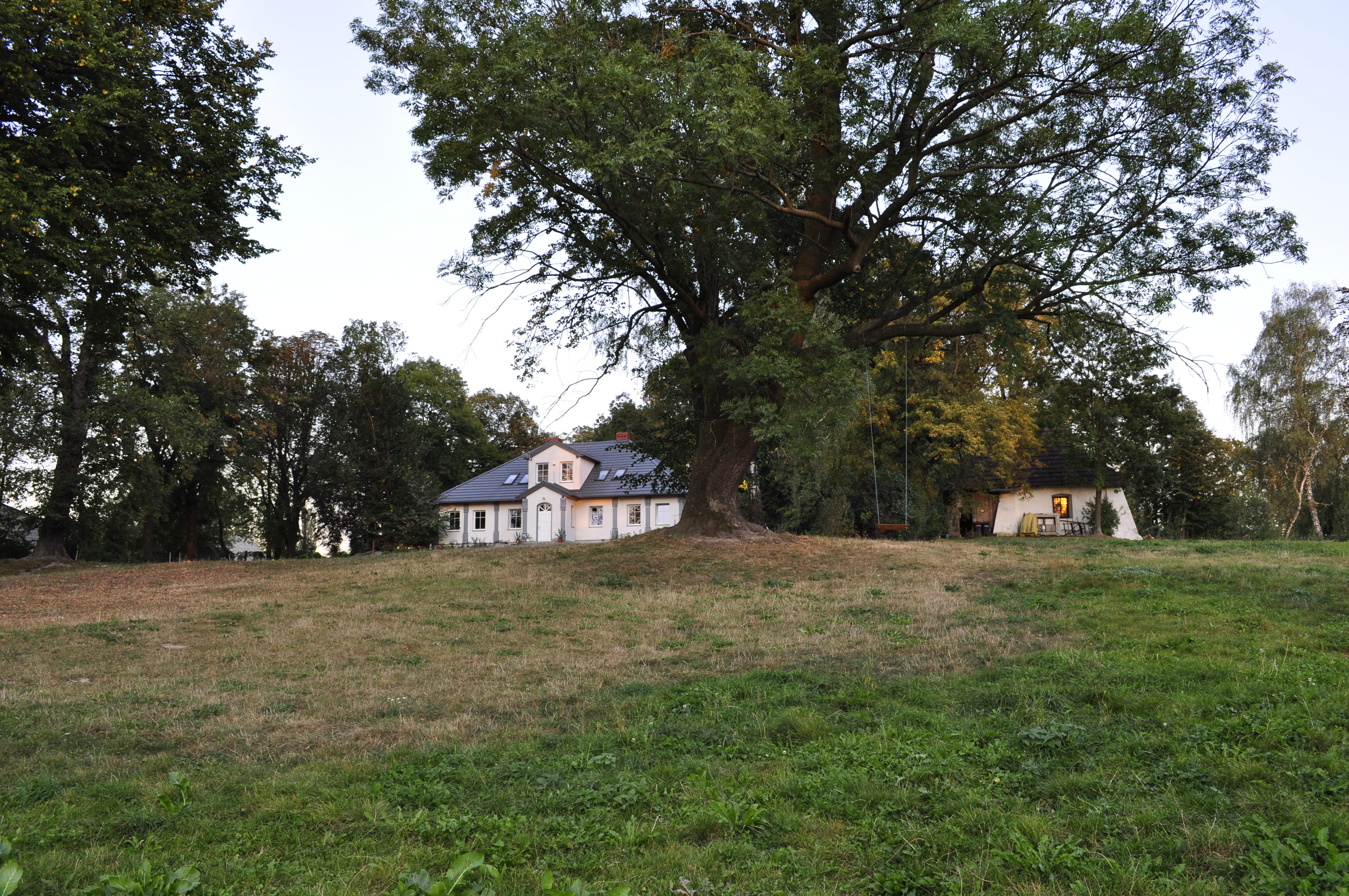
- Manor

- Location within Poland
- Coordinates: 50°51′30″N 21°11′50″E
- Country: Poland
- Voivodeship: Świętokrzyskie
- County: Ostrowiec
- Gmina: Waśniów

Mirogonowice [mirɔɡɔnɔˈvit͡sɛ] is a village in the administrative district of Gmina Waśniów, within Ostrowiec County, Świętokrzyskie Voivodeship, in south-central Poland. It lies approximately 5 km (3 mi) south of Waśniów, 17 km (11 mi) south-west of Ostrowiec Świętokrzyski, and 41 km (25 mi) east of the regional capital Kielce.
