= Doły Biskupie =

- Village
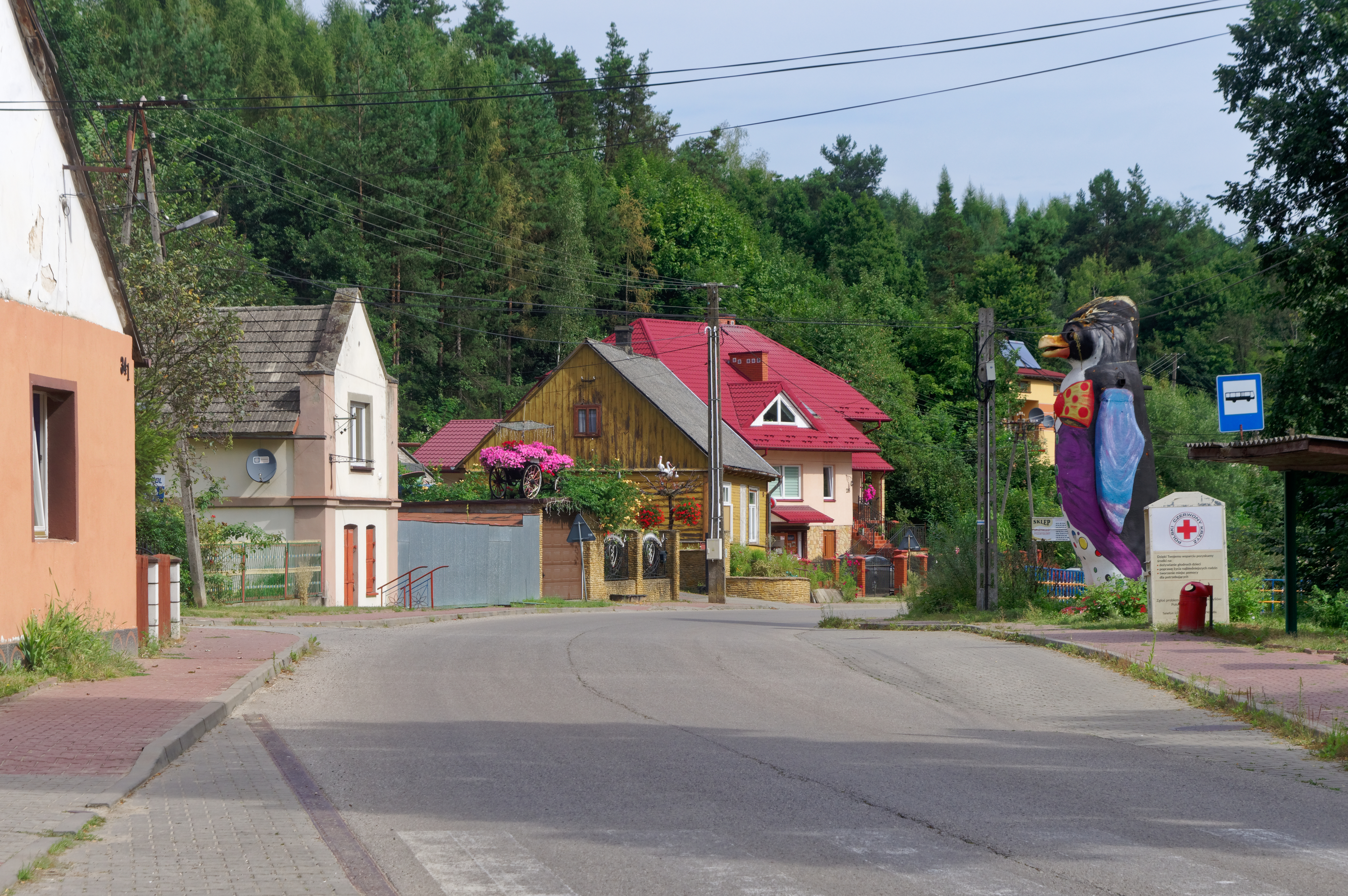

- Location within Poland
- Coordinates: 50°58′16″N 21°12′40″E
- Country: Poland
- Voivodeship: Świętokrzyskie
- County: Ostrowiec
- Gmina: Kunów
- Population: 483

Doły Biskupie [ˈdɔwɨ bisˈkupjɛ] is a village in the administrative district of Gmina Kunów, within Ostrowiec County, Świętokrzyskie Voivodeship, in south-central Poland. It lies approximately 6 km (4 mi) west of Kunów, 14 km (9 mi) west of Ostrowiec Świętokrzyski, and 43 km (27 mi) east of the regional capital Kielce.
