= Biechów, Ostrowiec County =

Biechów
- Village
- Location within Poland
- Coordinates: 50°55′37″N 21°17′20″E
- Country: Poland
- Voivodeship: Świętokrzyskie
- County: Ostrowiec
- Gmina: Kunów
- Population: 75

Biechów [ˈbjɛxuf] is a village in the administrative district of Gmina Kunów, within Ostrowiec County, Świętokrzyskie Voivodeship, in south-central Poland. It lies approximately 4 km (2 mi) south of Kunów, 8 km (5 mi) west of Ostrowiec Świętokrzyski, and 48 km (30 mi) east of the regional capital Kielce.
