= Grzegorzowice, Świętokrzyskie Voivodeship =

Grzegorzowice
- Village
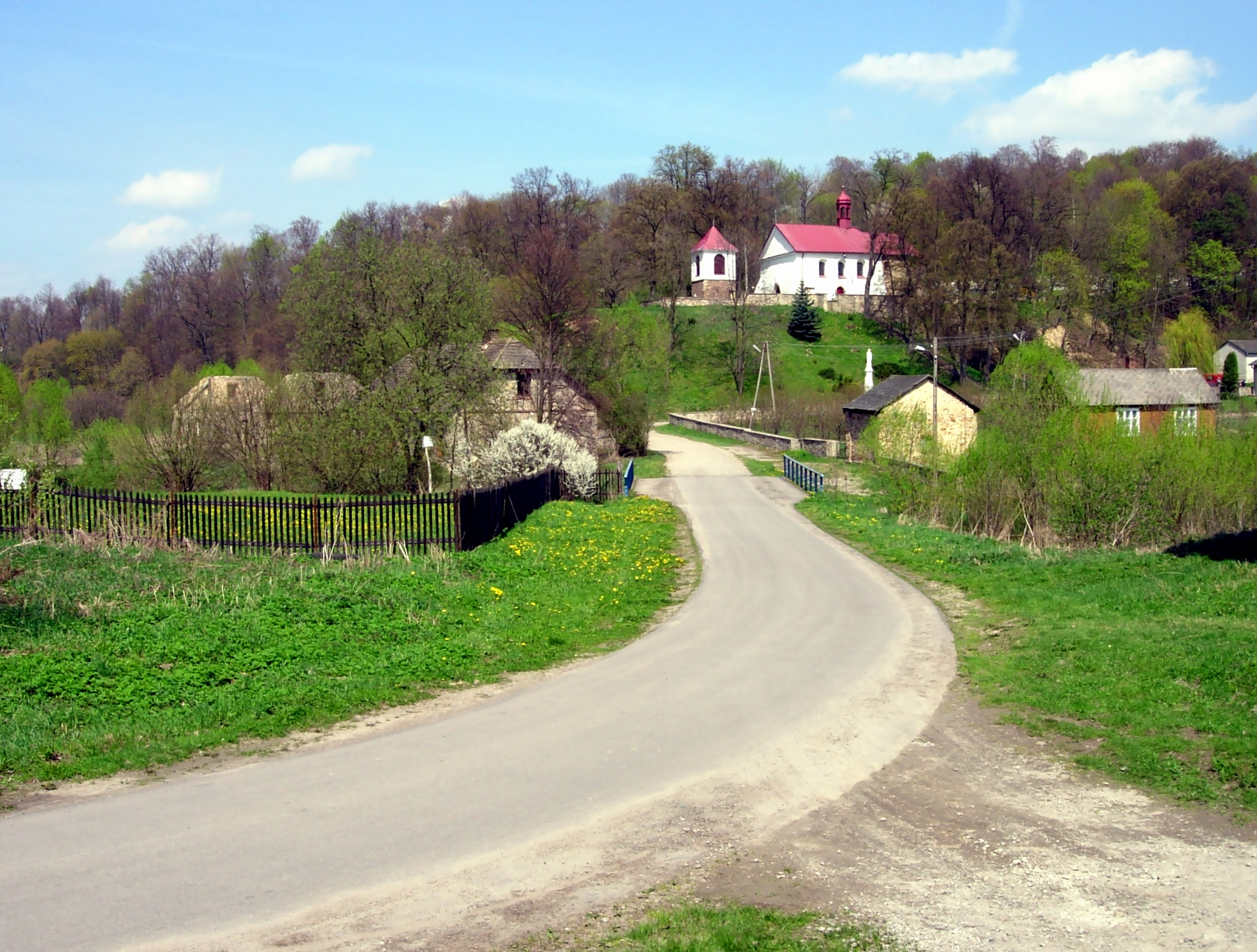

- Location within Poland
- Coordinates: 50°52′16″N 21°8′28″E
- Country: Poland
- Voivodeship: Świętokrzyskie
- County: Ostrowiec
- Gmina: Waśniów

Grzegorzowice [ɡʐɛɡɔʐɔˈvit͡sɛ] is a village in the administrative district of Gmina Waśniów, within Ostrowiec County, Świętokrzyskie Voivodeship, in south-central Poland. It lies approximately 7 km (4 mi) south-west of Waśniów, 20 km (12 mi) west of Ostrowiec Świętokrzyski, and 37 km (23 mi) east of the regional capital Kielce.

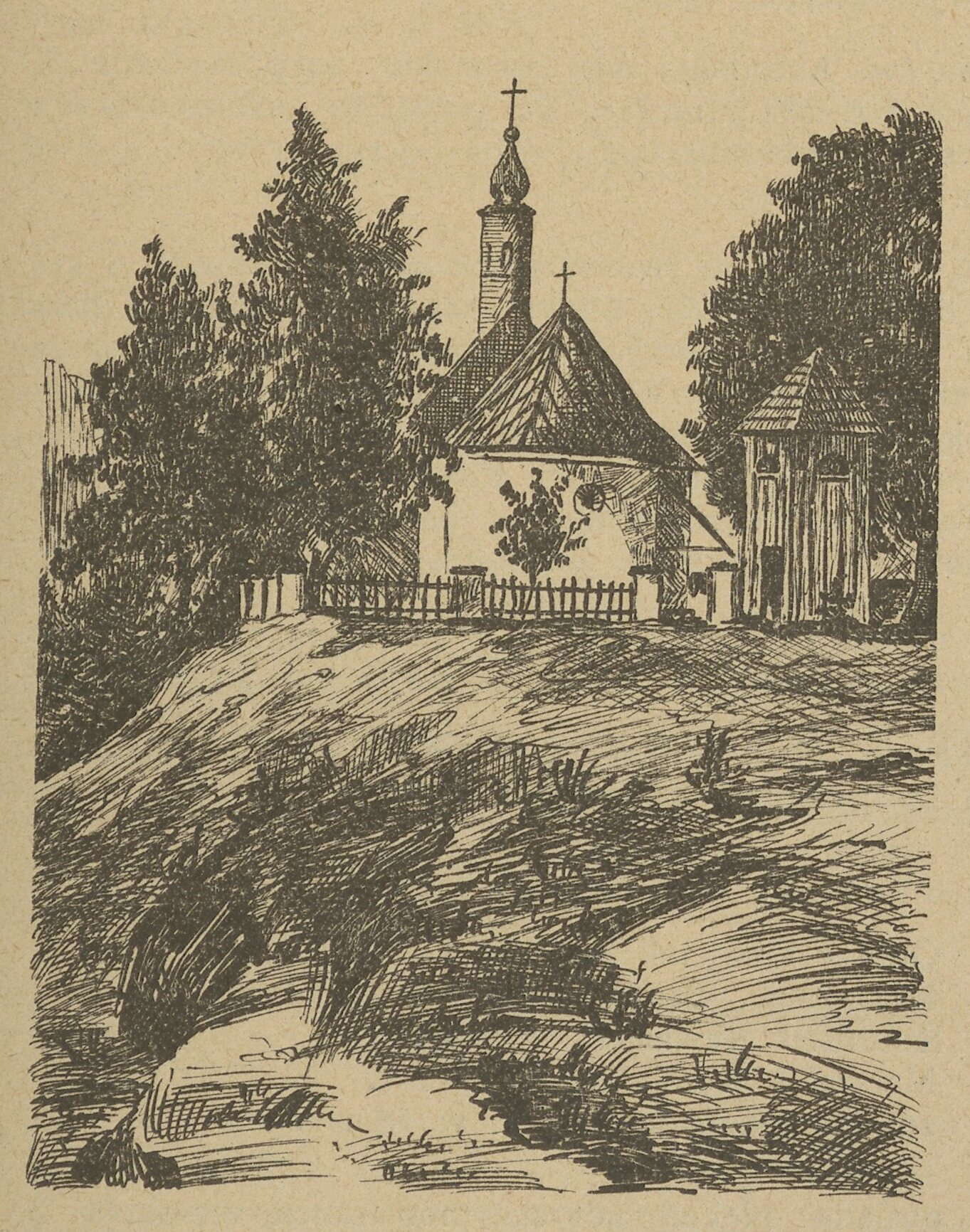
Church in Grzegorzowice, before 1907
