= Czajęcice, Świętokrzyskie Voivodeship =

Czajęcice
- Village
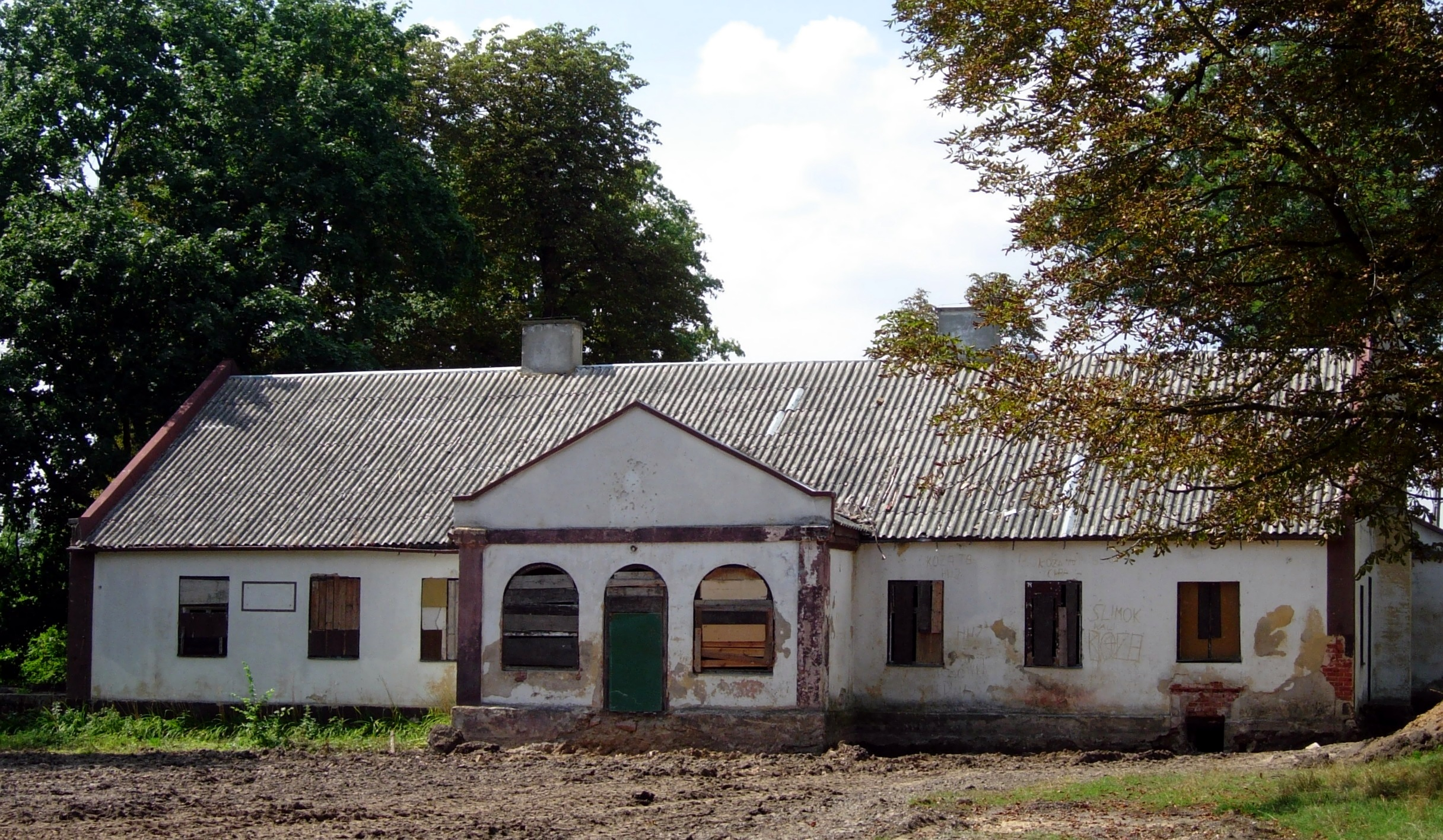
- Manor house

- Location within Poland
- Coordinates: 50°53′2″N 21°11′25″E
- Country: Poland
- Voivodeship: Świętokrzyskie
- County: Ostrowiec
- Gmina: Waśniów
- Population: 250

Czajęcice [t͡ʂajɛnˈt͡ɕit͡sɛ] is a village in the administrative district of Gmina Waśniów, within Ostrowiec County, Świętokrzyskie Voivodeship, in south-central Poland. It lies approximately 3 km (2 mi) south-west of Waśniów, 16 km (10 mi) west of Ostrowiec Świętokrzyski, and 41 km (25 mi) east of the regional capital Kielce.
