= Kraszków, Świętokrzyskie Voivodeship =

Kraszków
- Village
- Location within Poland
- Coordinates: 50°50′6″N 21°14′39″E
- Country: Poland
- Voivodeship: Świętokrzyskie
- County: Ostrowiec
- Gmina: Waśniów
- Population: 160

Kraszków [ˈkraʂkuf] is a village in the administrative district of Gmina Waśniów, within Ostrowiec County, Świętokrzyskie Voivodeship, in south-central Poland. It lies approximately 8 km (5 mi) south of Waśniów, 16 km (10 mi) south-west of Ostrowiec Świętokrzyski, and 45 km (28 mi) east of the regional capital Kielce.
