= Kurzacze, Ostrowiec County =

Kurzacze
- Village
- Location within Poland
- Coordinates: 51°0′33″N 21°22′11″E
- Country: Poland
- Voivodeship: Świętokrzyskie
- County: Ostrowiec
- Gmina: Kunów
- Population: 56

Kurzacze [kuˈʐat͡ʂɛ] is a village in the administrative district of Gmina Kunów, within Ostrowiec County, Świętokrzyskie Voivodeship, in south-central Poland. It lies approximately 9 km (6 mi) north-east of Kunów, 9 km (6 mi) north of Ostrowiec Świętokrzyski, and 55 km (34 mi) east of the regional capital Kielce.
