= Bukowie, Świętokrzyskie Voivodeship =

Bukowie
- Village
- Location within Poland
- Coordinates: 50°55′51″N 21°15′55″E
- Country: Poland
- Voivodeship: Świętokrzyskie
- County: Ostrowiec
- Gmina: Kunów
- Population: 384

Bukowie [buˈkɔvjɛ] is a village in the administrative district of Gmina Kunów, within Ostrowiec County, Świętokrzyskie Voivodeship, in south-central Poland. It lies approximately 4 km (2 mi) south of Kunów, 10 km (6 mi) west of Ostrowiec Świętokrzyski, and 46 km (29 mi) east of the regional capital Kielce.
