= Bukowie =

Bukowie may refer to the following places:

- Bukowie, Opole Voivodeship (south-west Poland)
- Bukowie, Świętokrzyskie Voivodeship (south-central Poland)
- Bukowie, West Pomeranian Voivodeship (north-west Poland)
