= Antoni Piotrowski =

Polish artist (1853–1924)

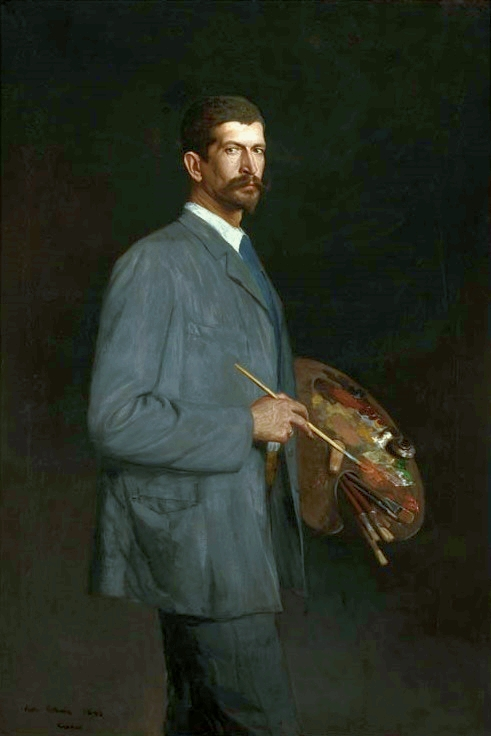
Self-portrait with Palette (1893, National Museum, Warsaw)

Antoni Adam Piotrowski (Bulgarian: Антони Пьотровски, Antoni Pyotrovski; 1853–1924) was a Polish Romanticist and realist painter who worked as war correspondent and illustrator for various Western European weeklies and periodicals in late-19th century during the Liberation of Bulgaria.

== Career highlights ==
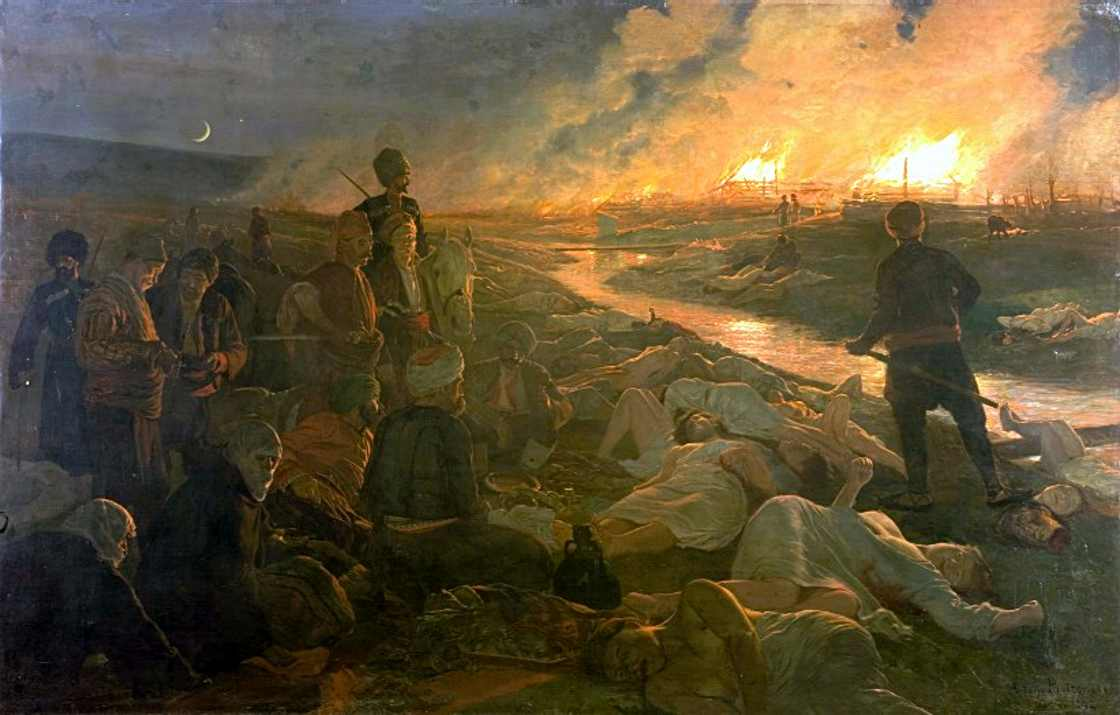
The razing of Batak painted by Piotrowski in 1899

Piotrowski was born in 1853 into a family of sheet iron worker in Nietulisko Duże near Kunów, then in the Russian sector of the partitioned Poland. From 1869 on, Piotrowski studied painting with professor Wojciech Gerson in Warsaw. Between 1875 and 1877 he studied in Munich with Wilhelm Lindenschmit the Younger, and from 1877 to 1879, with Poland's nominal painter Jan Matejko at the Academy of Fine Arts in Kraków.

In 1879, Piotrowski travelled to the newly liberated Principality of Bulgaria as a correspondent of the British weekly newspapers The Graphic and The Illustrated London News as well as the French newsmagazines Illustration and Le Monde Illustré. He moved back to Paris only to return to Bulgaria in 1885 to join the Serbo-Bulgarian War as a Bulgarian volunteer. For his merits during the fighting he was honoured with an Order of Bravery.

During his time as an artist in the Bulgarian Army Piotrowski painted the Battle of Slivnitsa, the storming of Tsaribrod and the Bulgarian entry in Pirot. He also published illustrations from the war in various Western European illustrated periodicals. Among his works were portraits of Bulgarian princes (knyaze) Alexander of Battenberg and Ferdinand of Saxe-Coburg-Gotha; Piotrowski was awarded an Order of Civil Merit by the latter. All his nine historical battle-scenes painted in Bulgaria were purchased by the Bulgarian state, and are exhibited in the National Museum of Military History in Sofia.

Piotrowski returned to Bulgaria in 1889: he visited Batak and painted his epic canvas The Batak Massacre. This painting of his won an award at the Plovdiv Fair in 1892. In 1900 Piotrowski returned to Poland and settled in Warsaw. In 1905, he was a war correspondent in Manchuria. He died in 1924 in Warsaw.
