= Witosławice, Świętokrzyskie Voivodeship =

Witosławice
- Village
- Location within Poland
- Coordinates: 50°50′30″N 21°12′16″E
- Country: Poland
- Voivodeship: Świętokrzyskie
- County: Ostrowiec
- Gmina: Waśniów

Witosławice [vitɔswaˈvit͡sɛ] is a village in the administrative district of Gmina Waśniów, within Ostrowiec County, Świętokrzyskie Voivodeship, in south-central Poland.
