= Strupice, Świętokrzyskie Voivodeship =

Strupice
- Village
- Location within Poland
- Coordinates: 50°54′11″N 21°14′34″E
- Country: Poland
- Voivodeship: Świętokrzyskie
- County: Ostrowiec
- Gmina: Waśniów
- Population: 130

Strupice [struˈpit͡sɛ] is a village in the administrative district of Gmina Waśniów, within Ostrowiec County, Świętokrzyskie Voivodeship, in south-central Poland. It lies approximately 2 km (1 mi) east of Waśniów, 12 km (7 mi) west of Ostrowiec Świętokrzyski, and 45 km (28 mi) east of the regional capital Kielce.
