= Wojciechowice, Ostrowiec County =

Wojciechowice
- Village
- Location within Poland
- Coordinates: 50°53′40″N 21°10′41″E
- Country: Poland
- Voivodeship: Świętokrzyskie
- County: Ostrowiec
- Gmina: Waśniów
- Population: 310

Wojciechowice (Polish pronunciation: [vɔjt͡ɕɛxɔˈvit͡sɛ]) is a village in the administrative district of Gmina Waśniów, within Ostrowiec County, Świętokrzyskie Voivodeship, in south-central Poland.
