= Miłkowska Karczma =

- Village
- Location within Poland
- Coordinates: 51°0′21″N 21°21′33″E
- Country: Poland
- Voivodeship: Świętokrzyskie
- County: Ostrowiec
- Gmina: Kunów
- Population: 403

Miłkowska Karczma (Polish pronunciation: [miwˈkɔfska ˈkart͡ʂma]) is a village in the administrative district of Gmina Kunów, within Ostrowiec County, Świętokrzyskie Voivodeship, in south-central Poland. It lies approximately 8 km (5 mi) north-east of Kunów, 9 km (6 mi) north of Ostrowiec Świętokrzyski, and 54 km (34 mi) east of the regional capital Kielce.
