= Boleszyn, Świętokrzyskie Voivodeship =

Boleszyn
- Village
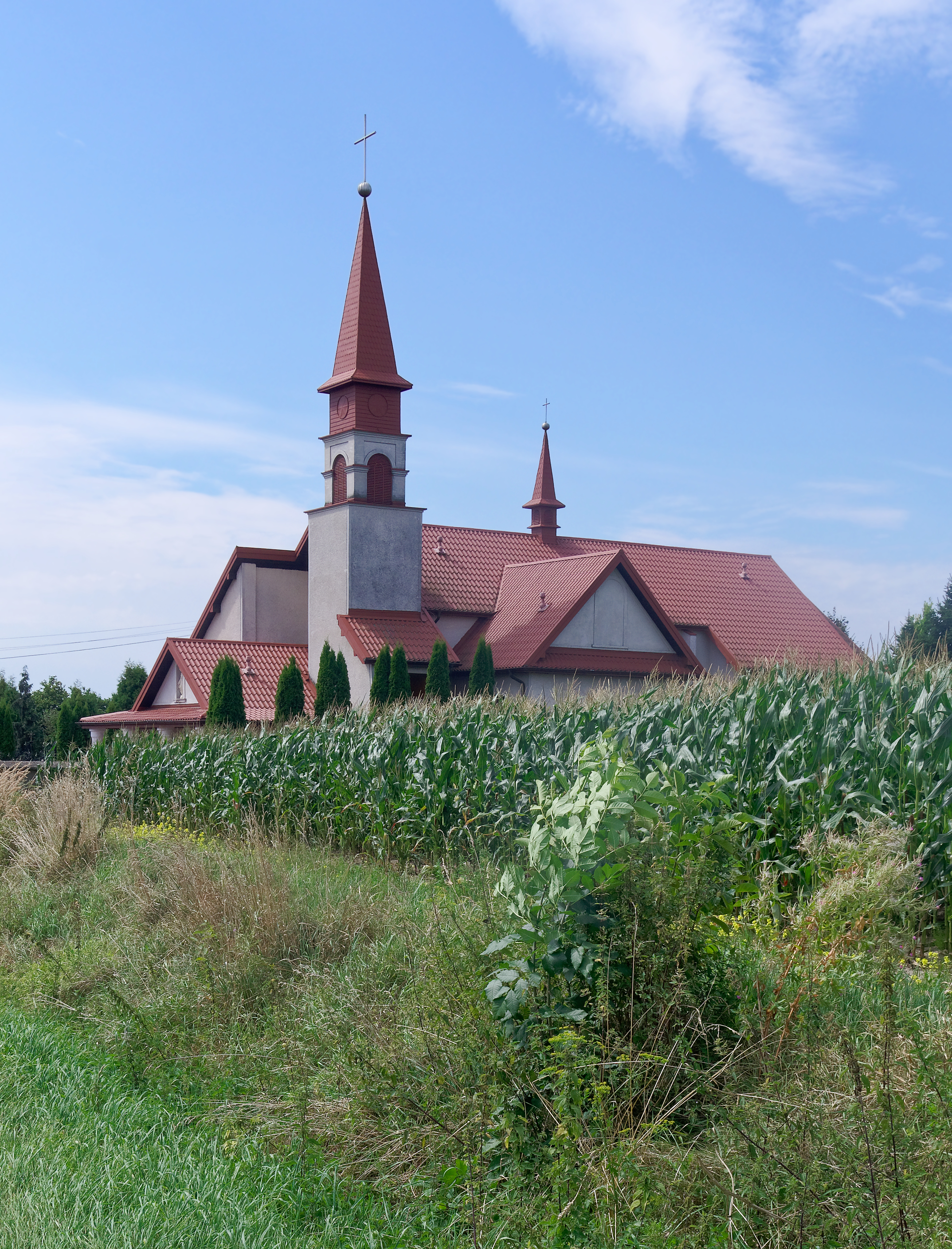
- Catholic church

- Location within Poland
- Coordinates: 50°55′33″N 21°10′49″E
- Country: Poland
- Voivodeship: Świętokrzyskie
- County: Ostrowiec
- Gmina: Waśniów

Boleszyn [bɔˈlɛʂɨn] is a village in the administrative district of Gmina Waśniów, within Ostrowiec County, Świętokrzyskie Voivodeship, in south-central Poland. It lies approximately 5 km (3 mi) north-west of Waśniów, 16 km (10 mi) west of Ostrowiec Świętokrzyski, and 40 km (25 mi) east of the regional capital Kielce.
