= Miłkowski =

Miłkowski (pronounced [miwˈkɔfskʲi]) is a Polish surname. Notable people with the name include:

- Antoni Milkowski (1935–2001), American sculptor
- Bill Milkowski (born 1954), American jazz critic, journalist and biographer
- Zygmunt Miłkowski (1824–1915), Polish romantic writer and politician

== See also ==
- Miłkowska Karczma, a village in Świętokrzyskie Voivodeship, Poland
- Wola Miłkowska, a village in Łódź Voivodeship, Poland
