= Wronów, Świętokrzyskie Voivodeship =

Wronów
- Village
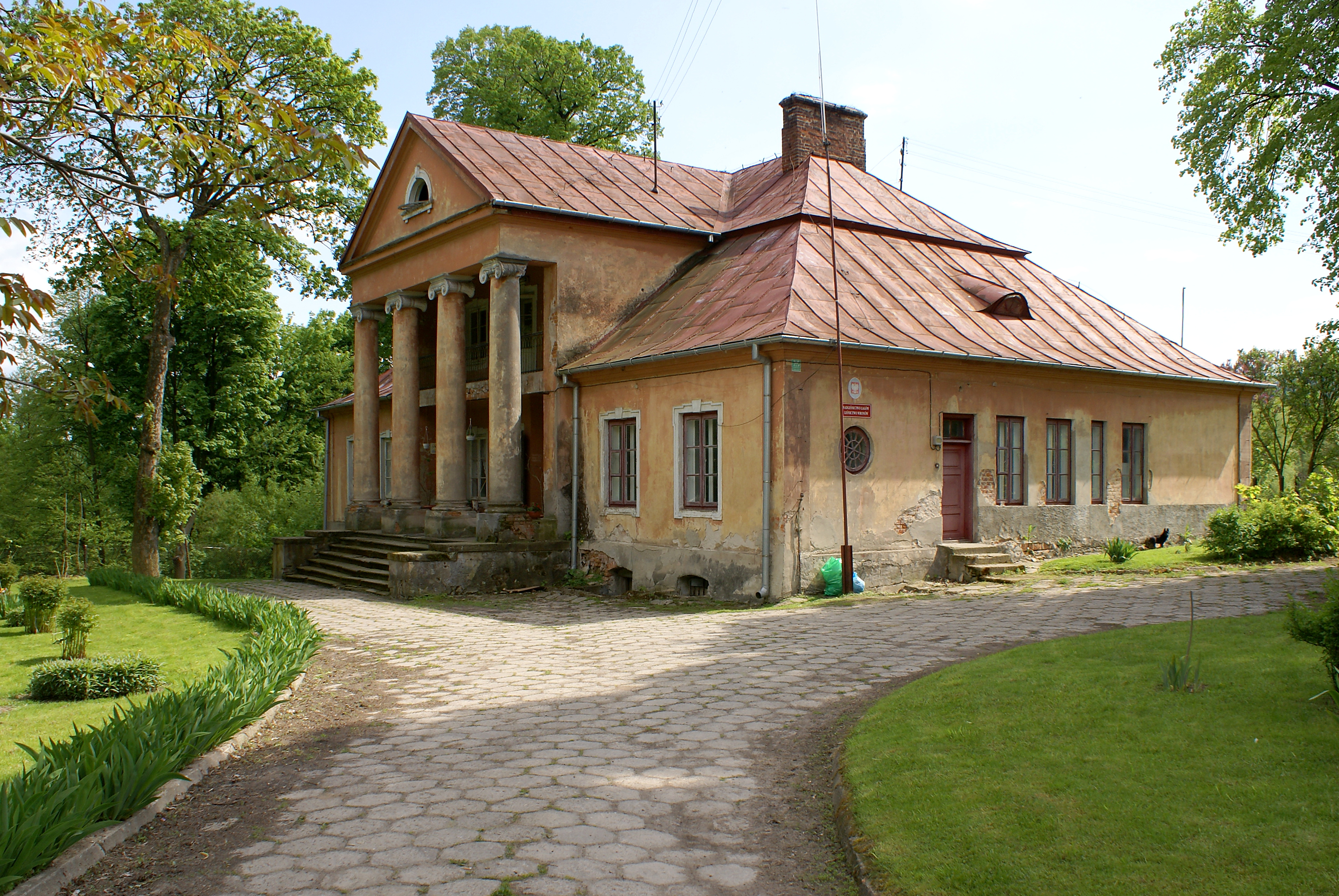
- Manor

- Location within Poland
- Coordinates: 50°51′1″N 21°10′48″E
- Country: Poland
- Voivodeship: Świętokrzyskie
- County: Ostrowiec
- Gmina: Waśniów
- Population: 260

Wronów [ˈvrɔnuf] is a village in the administrative district of Gmina Waśniów, within Ostrowiec County, Świętokrzyskie Voivodeship, in south-central Poland. It lies approximately 7 km (4 mi) south-west of Waśniów, 18 km (11 mi) south-west of Ostrowiec Świętokrzyski, and 40 km (25 mi) east of the regional capital Kielce.
