= Wronów =

Wronów may refer to the following places in Poland:

- Wronów, Lower Silesian Voivodeship (south-west Poland)
- Wronów, Lublin County in Lublin Voivodeship (east Poland)
- Wronów, Puławy County in Lublin Voivodeship (east Poland)
- Wronów, Świętokrzyskie Voivodeship (south-central Poland)
- Wronów, Krotoszyn County in Greater Poland Voivodeship (west-central Poland)
- Wronów, Pleszew County in Greater Poland Voivodeship (west-central Poland)
- Wronów, Opole Voivodeship (south-west Poland)
