= Nietulisko Duże =

- Village
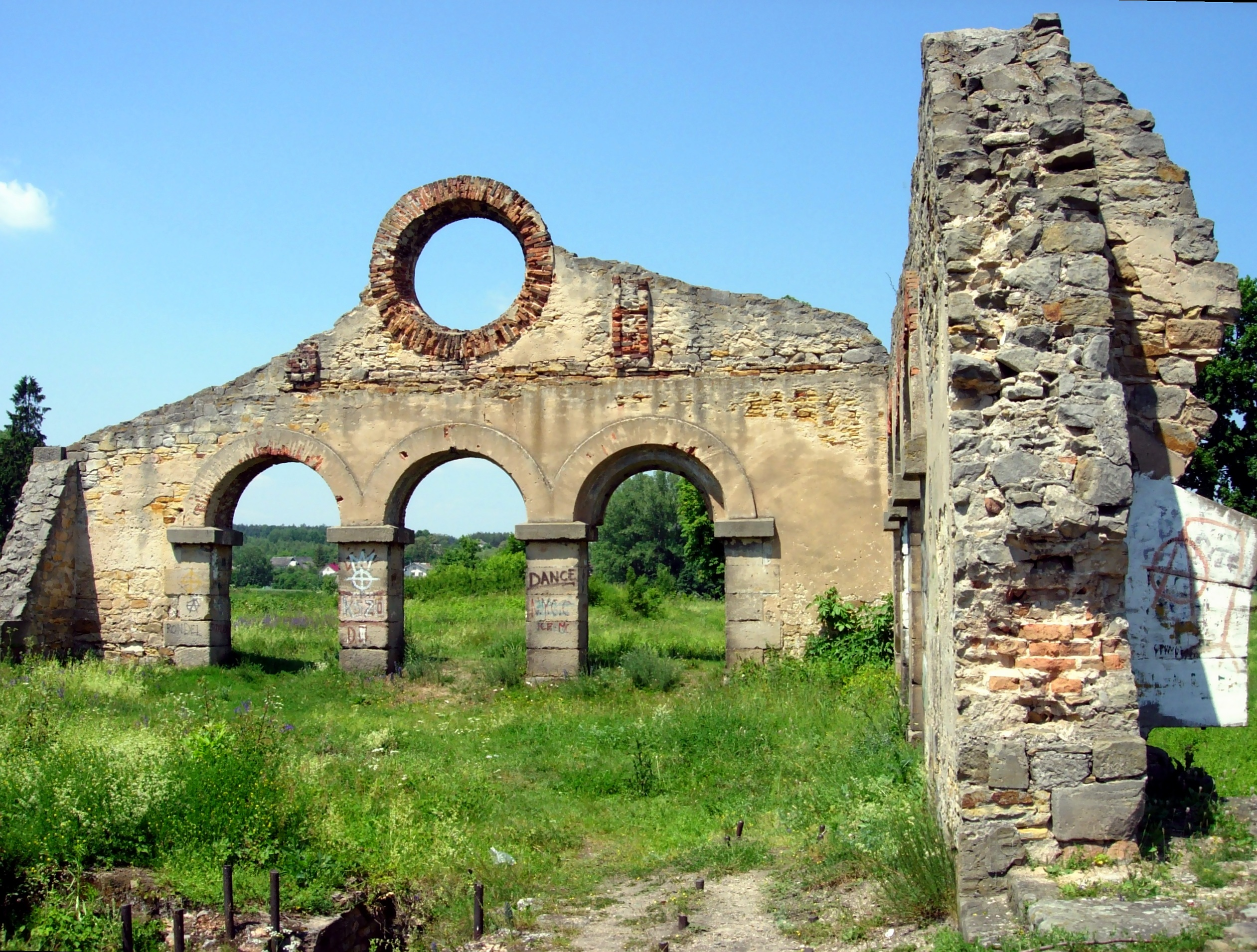

- Location within Poland
- Coordinates: 50°58′51″N 21°14′51″E
- Country: Poland
- Voivodeship: Świętokrzyskie
- County: Ostrowiec
- Gmina: Kunów
- Population: 825

Nietulisko Duże [ɲɛtuˈliskɔ ˈduʐɛ] is a village in the administrative district of Gmina Kunów, within Ostrowiec County, Świętokrzyskie Voivodeship, in south-central Poland. It lies approximately 4 km (2 mi) north-west of Kunów, 12 km (7 mi) north-west of Ostrowiec Świętokrzyski, and 46 km (29 mi) east of the regional capital Kielce.

Polish painter Antoni Piotrowski was born here.
