= Momina, Poland =

Momina
- Village
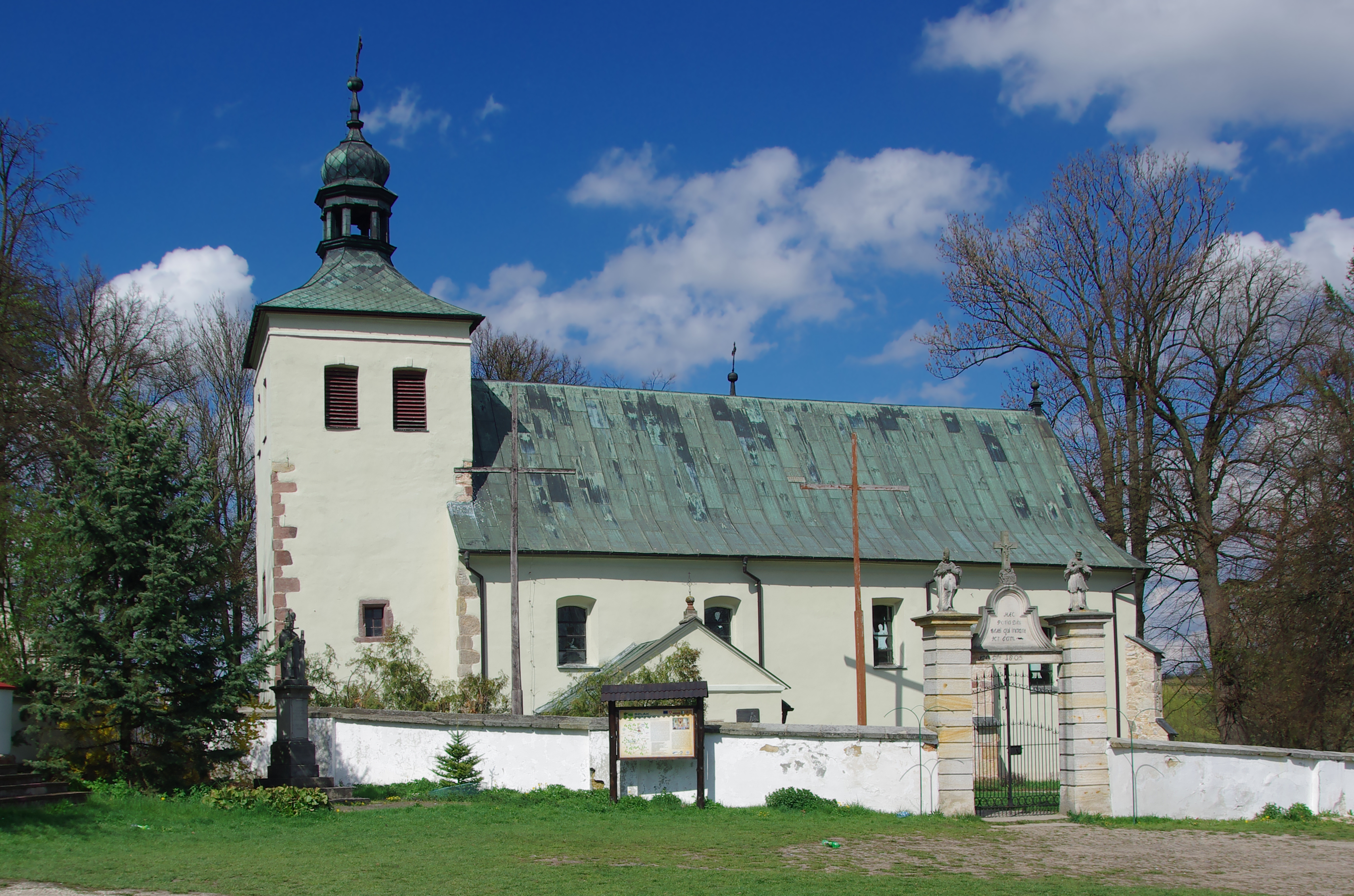
- Catholic church

- Location within Poland
- Coordinates: 50°52′44″N 21°16′31″E
- Country: Poland
- Voivodeship: Świętokrzyskie
- County: Ostrowiec
- Gmina: Waśniów
- Population (approx.): 160

Momina [mɔˈmina] is a village in the administrative district of Gmina Waśniów, within Ostrowiec County, Świętokrzyskie Voivodeship, in south-central Poland. It lies approximately 5 km (3 mi) south-east of Waśniów, 11 km (7 mi) south-west of Ostrowiec Świętokrzyski, and 47 km (29 mi) east of the regional capital Kielce.

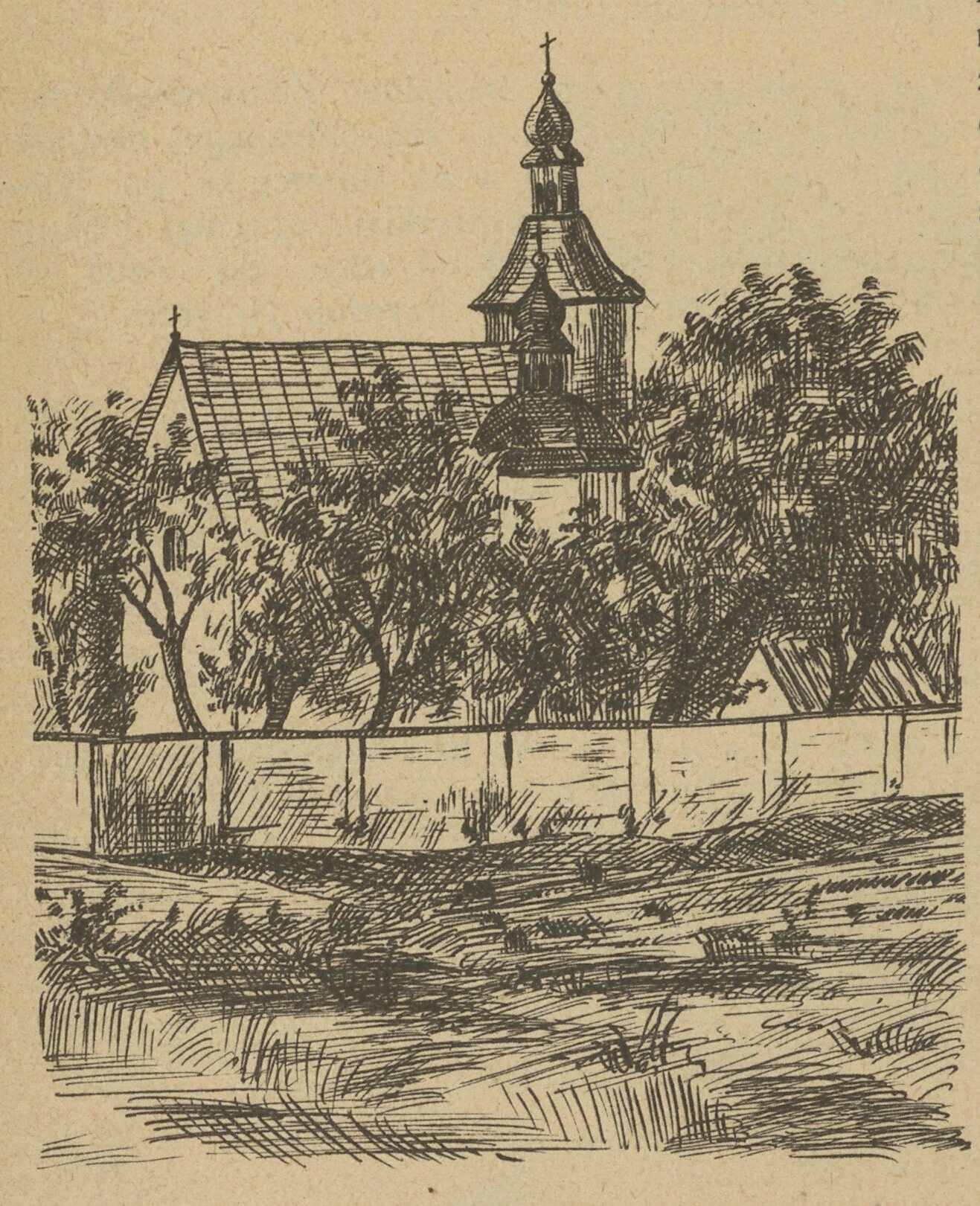
Church in Momina, before 1907
