= Sławęcice =

Sławęcice may refer to the following places in Poland:

- Sławęcice, Lower Silesian Voivodeship (south-west Poland)
- Sławęcice, Świętokrzyskie Voivodeship (south-central Poland)
- Sławęcice, West Pomeranian Voivodeship (north-west Poland)
