= Sławęcice, Świętokrzyskie Voivodeship =

Sławęcice
- Village
- Location within Poland
- Coordinates: 50°53′21″N 21°16′9″E
- Country: Poland
- Voivodeship: Świętokrzyskie
- County: Ostrowiec
- Gmina: Waśniów
- Population: 130

Sławęcice [swavɛnˈt͡ɕit͡sɛ] is a village in the administrative district of Gmina Waśniów, within Ostrowiec County, Świętokrzyskie Voivodeship, in south-central Poland. It lies approximately 4 km (2 mi) east of Waśniów, 11 km (7 mi) south-west of Ostrowiec Świętokrzyski, and 46 km (29 mi) east of the regional capital Kielce.
