= Strupice =

Strupice may refer to the following places in Poland:

- Strupice, Lower Silesian Voivodeship (south-west Poland)
- Strupice, Świętokrzyskie Voivodeship (south-central Poland)
