= Boleszyn =

Boleszyn refers to the following places in Poland:

- Boleszyn, Świętokrzyskie Voivodeship
- Boleszyn, Warmian-Masurian Voivodeship
