= Kaplica =

Kaplica may refer to:

- Kaplica, Świętokrzyskie Voivodeship, Poland
- Kaplica, Pomeranian Voivodeship, Poland
- Kaplıca, Northern Cyprus
- Kaplıca, Çat
