= Kaplica, Świętokrzyskie Voivodeship =

Village in Świętokrzyskie, Poland

Kaplica
- Village
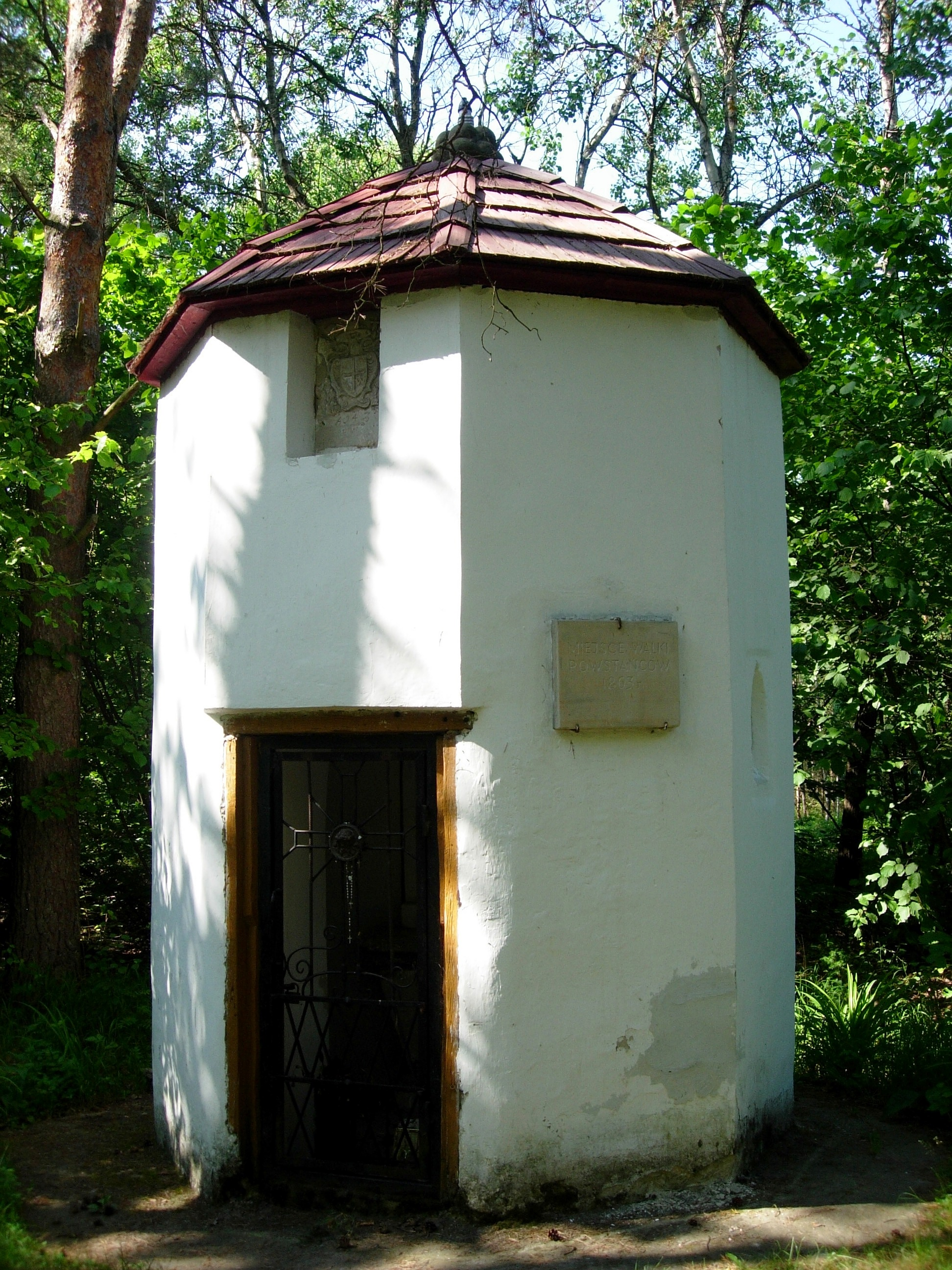
- Saint Catherine chapel in Kaplica

- Location within Poland
- Coordinates: 51°01′54″N 21°20′32″E
- Country: Poland
- Voivodeship: Świętokrzyskie
- County: Ostrowiec
- Gmina: Kunów
- Population: 0

Kaplica [kaˈplit͡sa] is a former village in the administrative district of Gmina Kunów, within Ostrowiec County, Świętokrzyskie Voivodeship, in south-central Poland.
