= Gmina Kunów =

Gmina Kunów Kunów Commune
- Gmina
- Flag Coat of arms
- Interactive map of Gmina Kunów
- Coordinates (Kunów): 50°57′31″N 21°16′59″E
- Country: Poland
- Voivodeship: Świętokrzyskie
- County: Ostrowiec
- Seat: Kunów

Area
  - Total: 113.73 km^{2} (43.91 sq mi)

Population (2006)
  - Total: 9,960
  - Density: 87.6/km^{2} (227/sq mi)
  - Urban: 3,127
  - Rural: 6,833
- Website: http://www.kunow.pl

Gmina Kunów is an urban-rural gmina (administrative district) in Ostrowiec County, Świętokrzyskie Voivodeship, in south-central Poland. Its seat is the town of Kunów, which lies approximately 9 kilometres (6 mi) west of Ostrowiec Świętokrzyski and 48 km (30 mi) east of the regional capital Kielce.

The gmina covers an area of 113.73 square kilometres (43.9 sq mi), and as of 2006 its total population is 9,960 (out of which the population of Kunów amounts to 3,127, and the population of the rural part of the gmina is 6,833).

== Villages ==
Apart from the town of Kunów, Gmina Kunów contains the villages and settlements of Biechów, Boksycka, Bukowie, Chocimów, Doły Biskupie, Doły Opacie, Janik, Kaplica, Kolonia Inwalidzka, Kolonia Piaski, Kurzacze, Małe Jodło, Miłkowska Karczma, Nietulisko Duże, Nietulisko Małe, Prawęcin, Rudka, Udziców and Wymysłów.

== Neighbouring gminas ==
Gmina Kunów is bordered by the town of Ostrowiec Świętokrzyski and by the gminas of Bodzechów, Brody, Pawłów, Sienno and Waśniów.
