= Gmina Waśniów =

Gmina Waśniów Waśniów Commune
- Gmina
- Flag Coat of arms
- Interactive map of Gmina Waśniów
- Coordinates (Waśniów): 50°53′55″N 21°13′23″E
- Country: Poland
- Voivodeship: Świętokrzyskie
- County: Ostrowiec
- Seat: Waśniów

Area
  - Total: 111.29 km^{2} (42.97 sq mi)

Population (2006)
  - Total: 7,056
  - Density: 63.40/km^{2} (164.2/sq mi)
- Website: http://www.gminawasniow.pl/

Gmina Waśniów is a rural gmina (administrative district) in Ostrowiec County, Świętokrzyskie Voivodeship, in south-central Poland. Its seat is the village of Waśniów, which lies approximately 14 kilometres (9 mi) west of Ostrowiec Świętokrzyski and 43 km (27 mi) east of the regional capital Kielce.

The gmina covers an area of 111.29 square kilometres (43.0 sq mi), and as of 2006 its total population is 7,056.

The gmina contains part of the protected area called Jeleniowska Landscape Park.

== Villages ==
Gmina Waśniów contains the villages and settlements of Boksyce, Boleszyn, Czajęcice, Czażów, Dobruchna, Garbacz, Grzegorzowice, Janowice, Jeżów, Kotarszyn, Kraszków, Milejowice, Mirogonowice, Momina, Nagorzyce, Nosów, Nowy Skoszyn, Pękosławice, Piotrów, Prusinowice, Roztylice, Sarnia Zwola, Sławęcice, Śnieżkowice, Strupice, Stryczowice, Wałsnów, Waśniów, Witosławice, Wojciechowice, Worowice, Wronów and Zajączkowice.

== Neighbouring gminas ==
Gmina Waśniów is bordered by the gminas of Baćkowice, Bodzechów, Kunów, Łagów, Nowa Słupia, Pawłów and Sadowie.
