= Franciszek Kacper Fornalski =

Polish officer during the November Uprising (1807–1850)

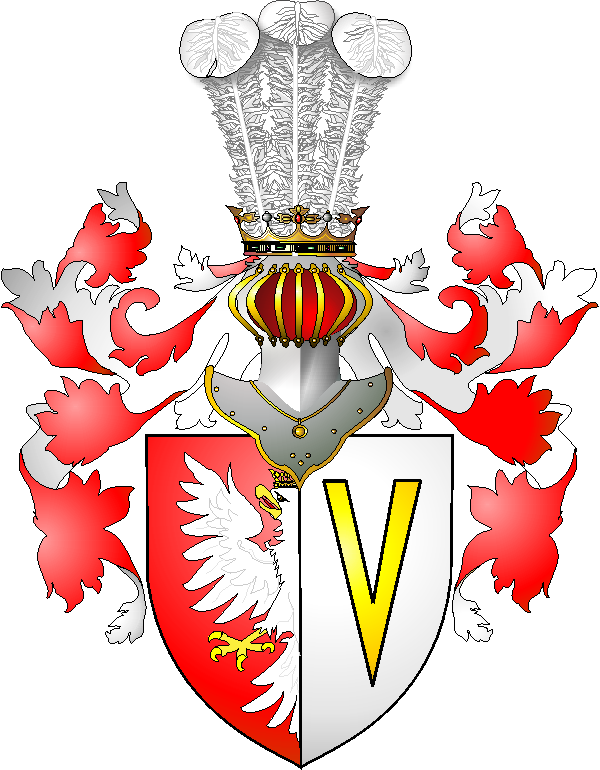
- Coat of arms: Fornalski coat of arms
- Born: 7 January 1807; Pilica, Silesian Voivodeship, Kingdom of Prussia
- Died: 17 July 1850 (aged 43); Kunów, Poland
- Spouse: Marianna Czerwińska
- Issue: Marianna Apolonia Dzierzgowska; Agata Józefa Wieruszewska; Helena Julianna Mazan; Józefa Cielecka; Emilia Eleonora Kłosińska
- Father: Franciszek Fornalski
- Mother: Julianna Konaszewska

Franciszek Kacper Fornalski (1807–1850) was the Polish officer during the November Uprising.

The elder son of Franciszek Fornalski and Julianna Konaszewska.

On 28 October 1811 he joined the Cadet Corps in Kalisz. Later he graduated from the Infantry Cadet School in Warsaw and joined the Army of Congress Poland. Together with other students of this school he participated in the November Uprising.

Initially, a non-commissioned officer in the 1st Rifle Regiment. He then became an adjutant to General Piotr Szembek in the 2nd Rifle Regiment. On 24 January 1831 he was promoted to second lieutenant in the 23rd Infantry Regiment. On 11 October 1831 he arrived from Modlin to Warsaw to the Governmental War Committee.

After the uprising, Franciszek Kacper Fornalski moved to Kunów where worked as an architect.
