= Łączki Kucharskie =

- Village
- Location within Poland
- Coordinates: 50°0′N 21°34′E
- Country: Poland
- Voivodeship: Subcarpathian
- County: Ropczyce-Sędziszów
- Gmina: Ropczyce

Łączki Kucharskie [ˈwɔnt͡ʂki kuˈxarskʲɛ] is a village in the administrative district of Gmina Ropczyce, within Ropczyce-Sędziszów County, Subcarpathian Voivodeship, in south-eastern Poland.
