= Kunów =

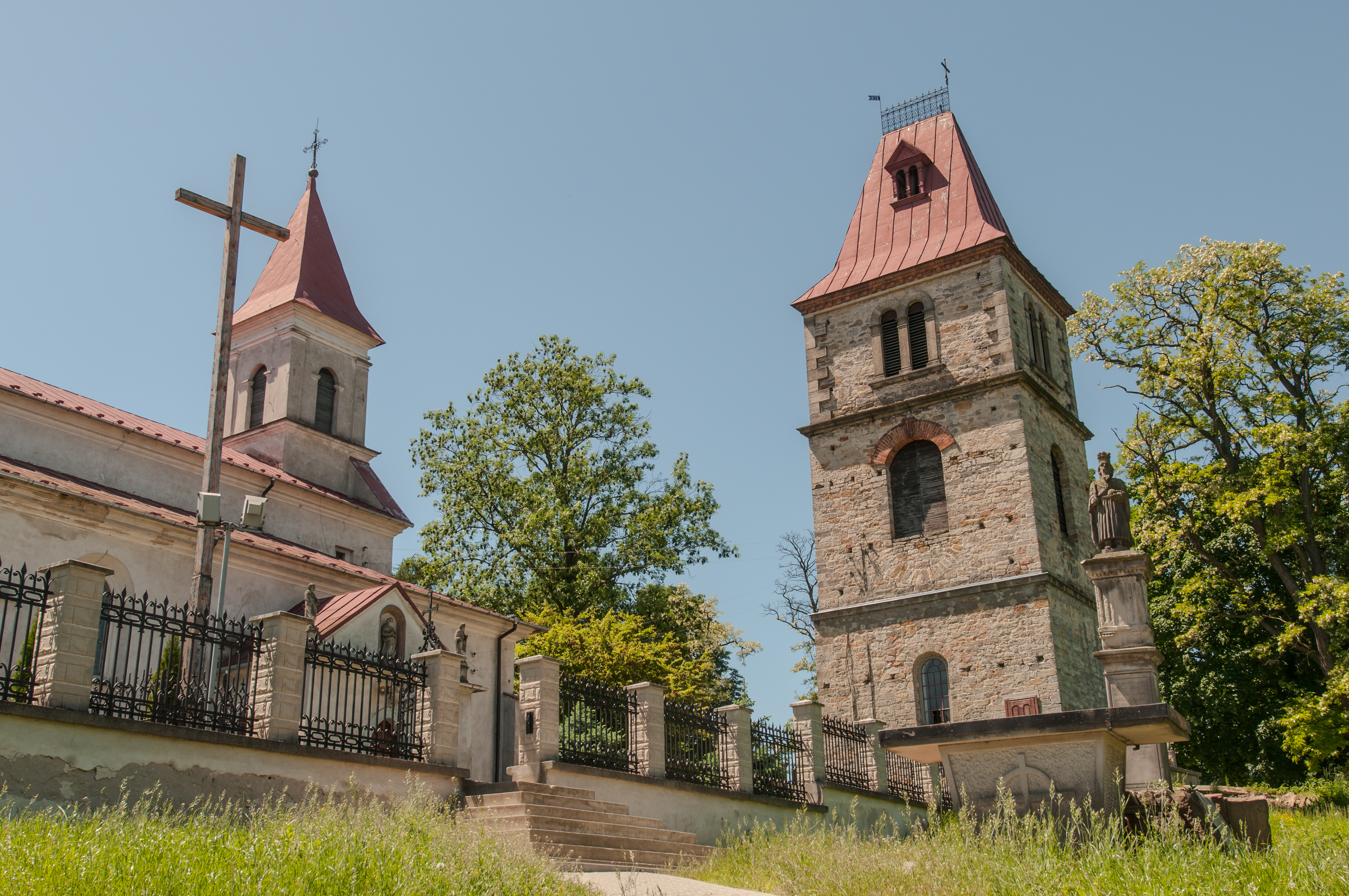
- Saint Ladislaus church and bell tower

- Flag Coat of arms

- Location within Poland
- Coordinates: 50°57′31″N 21°16′59″E
- Country: Poland
- Voivodeship: Świętokrzyskie
- County: Ostrowiec
- Gmina: Kunów

Area
  - Total: 7.28 km^{2} (2.81 sq mi)

Population (2006)
  - Total: 3,127
  - Density: 430/km^{2} (1,110/sq mi)
- Time zone: UTC+1 (CET)
  - Summer (DST): UTC+2 (CEST)
- Postal code: 27-415
- Area code: +48 41
- Car plates: TOS
- Website: http://www.kunow.pl/

Kunów [ˈkunuf] is a town in Ostrowiec County, Świętokrzyskie Voivodeship, Poland, with 3,153 inhabitants (2004). It lies in Lesser Poland, on the Kamienna river, 8 kilometres (5 miles) northwest of Ostrowiec Świętokrzyski.

== History ==
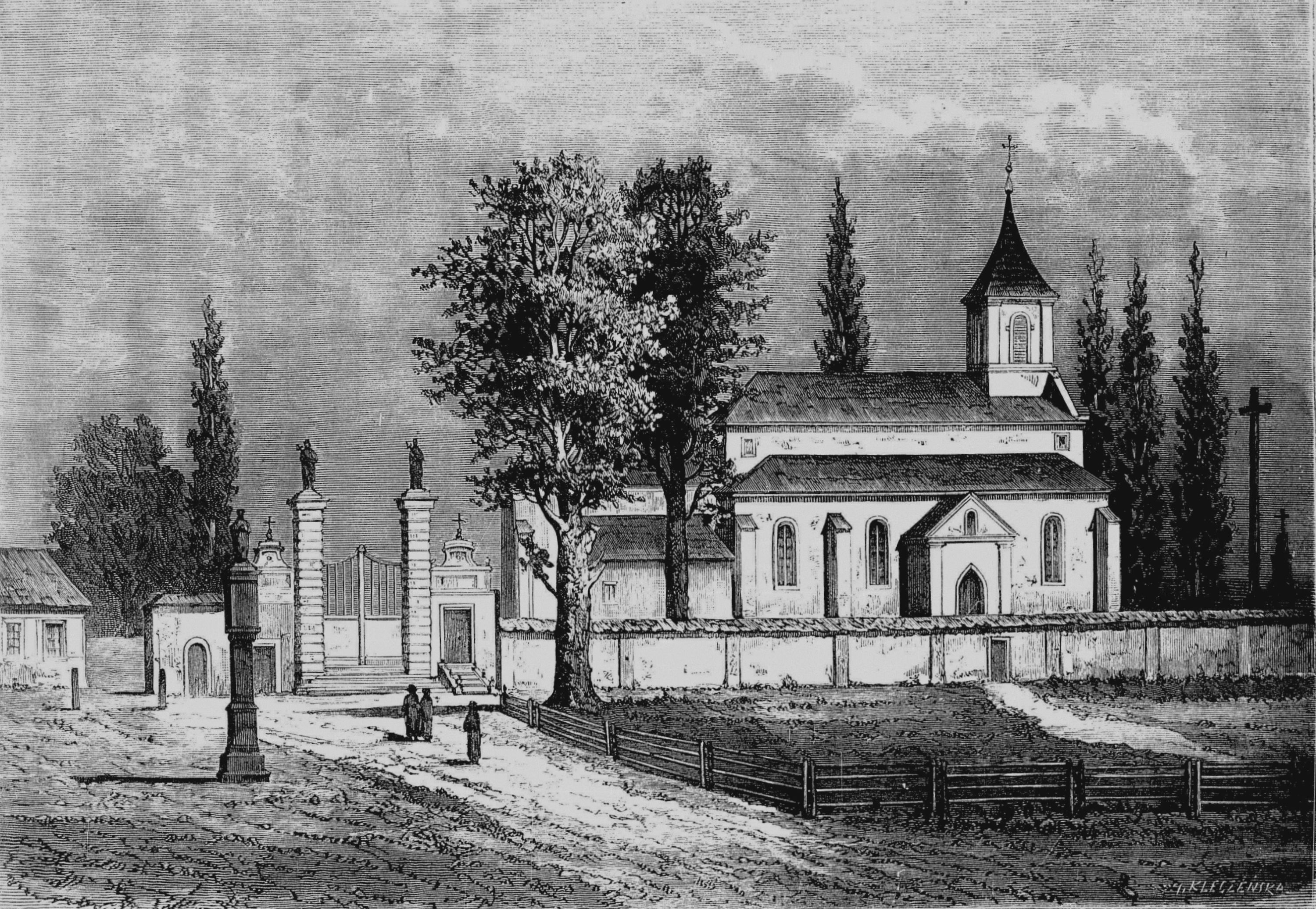
Saint Ladislaus church on woodcut print by Józefa Kleczeńska from 1882

In the early Middle Ages Kunów belonged to the Archbishops of Kraków, who had a manor house here. In 1241 the village was raided by the Mongols (see First Mongol invasion of Poland), and in 1247 it was destroyed by the army of Prince Konrad I of Masovia. In 1365 King Casimir III the Great granted it town rights, and at that time Kunów was the seat of a parish whose area was 63 square kilometres (24 sq mi). The town belonged to Sandomierz Voivodeship in the Lesser Poland Province. In the 15th century powerful Cardinal Zbigniew Oleśnicki spent a lot of time in Kunów, which already had a wooden church of St. Władysław. In 1502 the town was completely burned by the Crimean Tatars, and as a result it temporarily lost its Magdeburg rights, regaining the privileges on August 29, 1535. In 1578 Kunów had 65 different artisans, and was famous for its white and red marble, used in construction of several palaces (such as the complex of Łazienki Park in Warsaw). By 1616 the town had 130 houses, a parish school and two churches, however after the catastrophic Swedish invasion of Poland (1655–1660), the number of houses was reduced to 63, with a population of 530.

After the wars of the 1650s, Kunów's importance declined. In 1705, 560 residents died in an epidemic, and in the late 18th century, after the Third Partition of Poland, the town was annexed by the Habsburg Empire. After the Polish victory in the Austro-Polish War of 1809, it became part of the short-lived Duchy of Warsaw, and after the duchy's dissolution in 1815, it fell to the Russian-controlled Congress Poland, where it remained until 1915. Kunów burned in fires in 1814 and 1818, and in 1860 it had 145 houses with 1,121 inhabitants. During the January Uprising the town was one of centers of the rebellion, here leaders of Polish forces met to discuss their tactics. Kunów, however, lost its importance at the expense of the fast-growing industrial town of Ostrowiec Świętokrzyski, and was stripped of its town rights on June 1, 1869.

In the Second Polish Republic Kunów belonged to Kielce Voivodeship, but it stagnated and remained a village. According to the 1921 census, Kunów with the adjacent railway settlement and manor farm had a population of 2,249, of which 95.4% declared Polish nationality and 4.6% declared Jewish nationality. During World War II, it was occupied by Germany.

After World War II, Kunów began to develop. Waterworks, new school, library, health center, local government office and post office were opened. In 1990, town rights were restored.

== Sights ==
Among points of interest there is the parish church of St. Władysław (17th century), with a bell tower (1896). At a church cemetery there are tombs of January Uprising veterans.

== Transport ==
It is located along the European route E371, and the town has a rail station on the Skarżysko-Kamienna – Sandomierz line.
