= Waśniów =

- Village
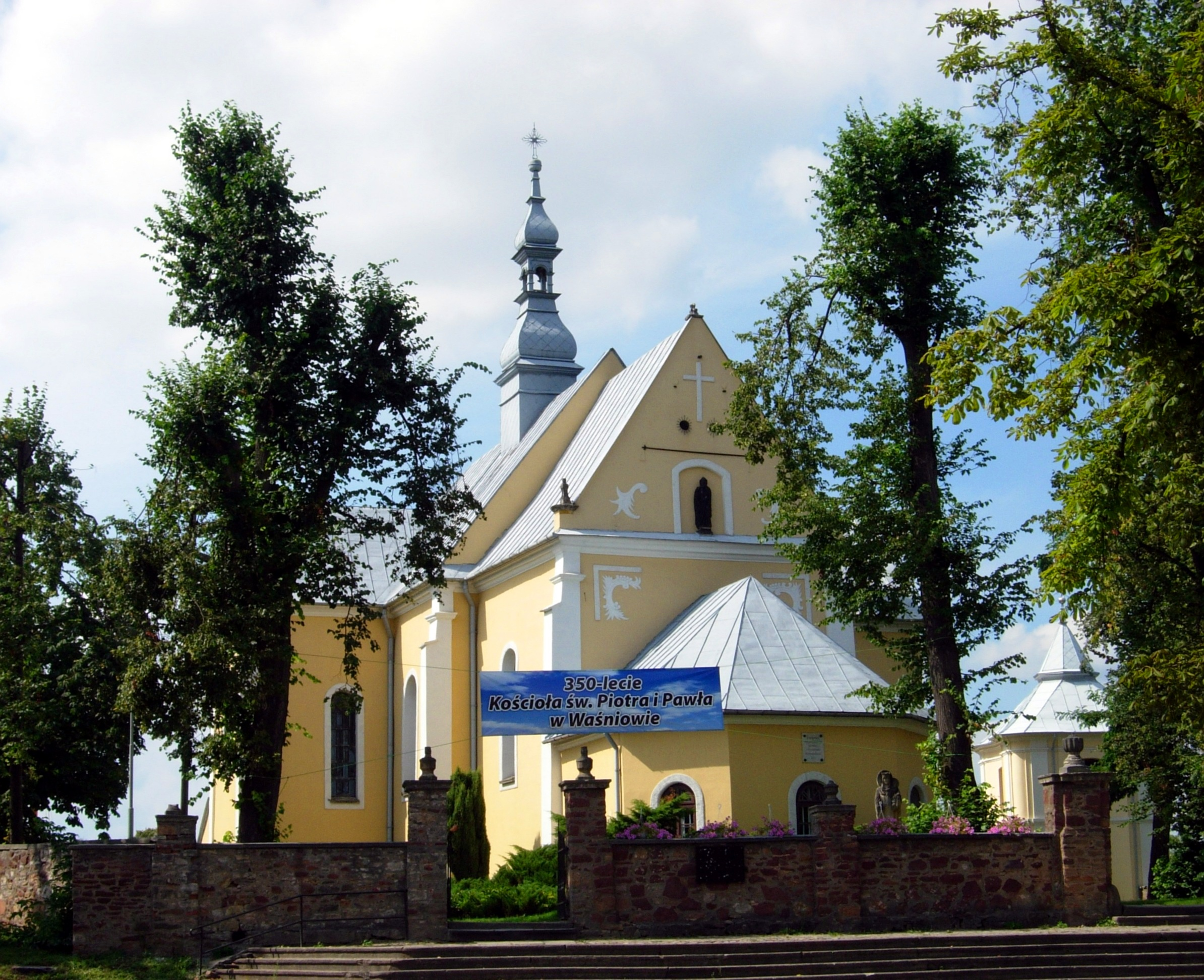
- Church of Saints Peter and Paul

- Coat of arms

- Location within Poland
- Coordinates: 50°53′55″N 21°13′23″E
- Country: Poland
- Voivodeship: Świętokrzyskie
- County: Ostrowiec
- Gmina: Waśniów

Population
  - Total: 460

Waśniów [ˈvaɕɲuf] is a village in Ostrowiec County, Świętokrzyskie Voivodeship, in south-central Poland. It is the seat of the gmina (administrative district) called Gmina Waśniów. It lies in historic Lesser Poland, approximately 14 km (9 mi) west of Ostrowiec Świętokrzyski and 43 km (27 mi) east of the regional capital Kielce.

Waśniów is one of the oldest villages in the area. It had the status of a town from 1351 to 1869, and its name (also spelled as Waśniów) comes from a Slavic language word "wasn", which means an argument. The village was first mentioned in the year 1145, as Vasnov, later Wasnowe, and Wasnow. Following the order of Duke Mieszko III the Old, Waśniów, together with its market place, was granted to the Archbishops of Gniezno. Soon afterwards, in 1147, the village passed into the hands of Canons Regular from Trzemeszno.

On January 7, 1351, King Kazimierz Wielki granted Sroda Slaska town charter to Waśniów. In the Kingdom of Poland and the Polish–Lithuanian Commonwealth, Waśniów belonged to the Sandomierz Voivodeship. The town was located along ancient merchant routes from Sandomierz and Opatow towards central Poland. In 1409, during the Polish–Lithuanian–Teutonic War, it was visited by King Wladyslaw Jagiello, and in 1432, Waśniów passed into the hands of the Wachock Abbey. Despite additional privileges, granted to it by King Kazimierz Jagiellonczyk in 1467, Waśniów remained a small town, which furthermore burned in 80%, in a great fire in 1523. The fire put an end to its development, and further destruction was brought by the Swedish invasion of Poland (1656), as well as the Great Northern War (1705).

After the Partitions of Poland, Waśniów briefly belonged to the Habsburg Empire, and in 1815 – 1915, it was part of Russian-controlled Congress Poland. In 1827, the town had a population of 295, with 42 houses. During the January Uprising, Marian Langiewicz stayed in the area of WasnWaśniówiow. Several skirmishes took place here between Russian soldiers and Polish rebels, and as a punishment, Waśniów was stripped of town charter in 1869. In the late 19th century, the village was located in Opatow County, and had a population of 386. By the 1920s, already in Second Polish Republic’s Kielce Voivodeship, Waśniów had a population of 580. It did not have a train station, the nearest one was and still is located 14 kilometers away, at Ostrowiec Swietokrzyski (known then as Ostrowiec nad Kamienna).

Among points of interest at Waśniów is the parish Church of Saints Peter and Paul, whose existence was first mentioned in 1145. In 1656, the wooden church was replaced by a brick, late Renaissance complex, with a Baroque interior. In 1882 the church was expanded, and in 1971–1975 it was restored.

In 1633, in a folwark called Gaj, located near Waśniów, a prominent Polish language poet Wespazjan Kochowski was born. He dedicated one of his poems to Waśniów.
