= Ostrowiec County =

Ostrowiec County Powiat ostrowiecki
- County
- Flag Coat of arms

- Location within the voivodeship
- Coordinates (Ostrowiec Świętokrzyski): 50°56′N 21°24′E
- Country: Poland
- Voivodeship: Świętokrzyskie
- Seat: Ostrowiec Świętokrzyski
- Gminas: Total 6 (incl. 1 urban): Ostrowiec Świętokrzyski; Gmina Bałtów; Gmina Bodzechów; Gmina Ćmielów; Gmina Kunów; Gmina Waśniów

Area
  - Total: 616.33 km^{2} (237.97 sq mi)

Population (2019)
  - Total: 109,512
  - Density: 177.68/km^{2} (460.20/sq mi)
  - Urban: 74,620
  - Rural: 34,892
- Car plates: TOS
- Website: www.ostrowiec.starostwo.gov.pl

Ostrowiec County (Polish: powiat ostrowiecki) is a unit of territorial administration and local government (powiat) in Świętokrzyskie Voivodeship, south-central Poland. It came into being on January 1, 1999, as a result of the Polish local government reforms passed in 1998. Its administrative seat and largest town is Ostrowiec Świętokrzyski, which lies 56 kilometres (35 mi) east of the regional capital Kielce. The county also contains the towns of Ćmielów, lying 10 km (6 mi) south-east of Ostrowiec Świętokrzyski, and Kunów, 9 km (6 mi) west of Ostrowiec Świętokrzyski.

The county covers an area of 616.33 square kilometres (238.0 sq mi). As of 2019 its total population is 109,512, out of which the population of Ostrowiec Świętokrzyski is 68,641, that of Ćmielów is 3,012, that of Kunów is 2,967, and the rural population is 34,892.

== Neighbouring counties ==
Ostrowiec County is bordered by Lipsko County to the north, Opatów County to the south, and Kielce County and Starachowice County to the west.

== Administrative divisions ==
The county is subdivided into six gminas (one urban, two urban-rural and three rural). These are listed in the following table, in descending order of population.

Gmina	Type	Area (km^{2})	Population (2019)	Seat
Ostrowiec Świętokrzyski	urban	46.4	68,641	
Gmina Bodzechów	rural	122.3	13,418	Ostrowiec Świętokrzyski *
Gmina Kunów	urban-rural	113.7	9,817	Kunów
Gmina Ćmielów	urban-rural	117.7	7,338	Ćmielów
Gmina Waśniów	rural	111.3	6,847	Waśniów
Gmina Bałtów	rural	104.9	3,451	Bałtów
* seat not part of the gmina
