= Znamensky =

Znamensky (masculine), Znamenskaya (feminine), or Znamenskoye (neuter) may refer to:

- Znamensky (surname) (Znamenskaya), Russian last name
- Znamensky District, several districts in the countries of the former Soviet Union
- Znamensky (rural locality) (Znamenskaya, Znamenskoye), several rural localities in Russia
- Brothers Znamensky Memorial, an IAAF World Challenge meeting

== See also ==
- Znamensk, several inhabited localities in Russia
