= Znamensky (surname) =

Znamensky (Russian: Знаменский) is a Russian masculine surname; its feminine counterpart is Znamenskaya. It is a Russian Orthodox clerical surname derived from the word знамение, znameniye (sign, omen), which may mean either a type of icon, i.e. Our Lady of the Sign (and a church or monastery dedicated to it), or the sign of the cross gesture.

Notable people with the surname include:

- Alexander Znamensky (1877–1928), Russian wrestler
- Georgy Znamensky (1903–1946), Russian runner
- Mikhail Znamensky (1833–1892), Russian writer, memoirist, painter, caricaturist, archeologist and ethnographer
- Seraphim Znamensky (1906–1942), Russian runner, brother of Georgy
- Yuliya Znamenskaya (born 1984), Kazakhstani female water polo player
