= Wólka Pętkowska-Kolonia =

- Village
- Location within Poland
- Coordinates: 51°00′17″N 21°37′31″E
- Country: Poland
- Voivodeship: Holy Cross
- County: Ostrowiec
- Municipality: Bałtów
- Sołectwo: Wólka Pętkowska
- Time zone: UTC+1 (CET)
  - Summer (DST): UTC+2 (CEST)
- Postal code: 27-423
- Area code: +48 91
- Vehicle registration: TOS

Wólka Pętkowska-Kolonia (Polish: [ˈvulka pɛntˈkɔfska kɔˈlɔɲa]), formerly known as Wólka Pętowska (Polish: [ˈvulka pɛntˈɔfska]), is a village in Holy Cross Voivodeship, Poland, located within the municipality of Pleszew in Ostrowiec County. It belongs to the sołectwo of Wólka Pętkowska.

== History ==
The settlement, then known as Wólka Pętowska, was founded as an extension of the nearby village of Wólka Pętkowska, and functioned as such until 2015, when it was incorporated into its administrative boundaries. It was separated from it in 2024, forming a new village known as Wólka Pętkowska-Kolonia.
