= Crown of the Kingdom of Poland =

1385–1795 territorial possessions of the King of Poland

Crown of the Kingdom of Poland Korona Królestwa Polskiego (Polish) Corona Regni Poloniae (Latin)
- 1385–1795
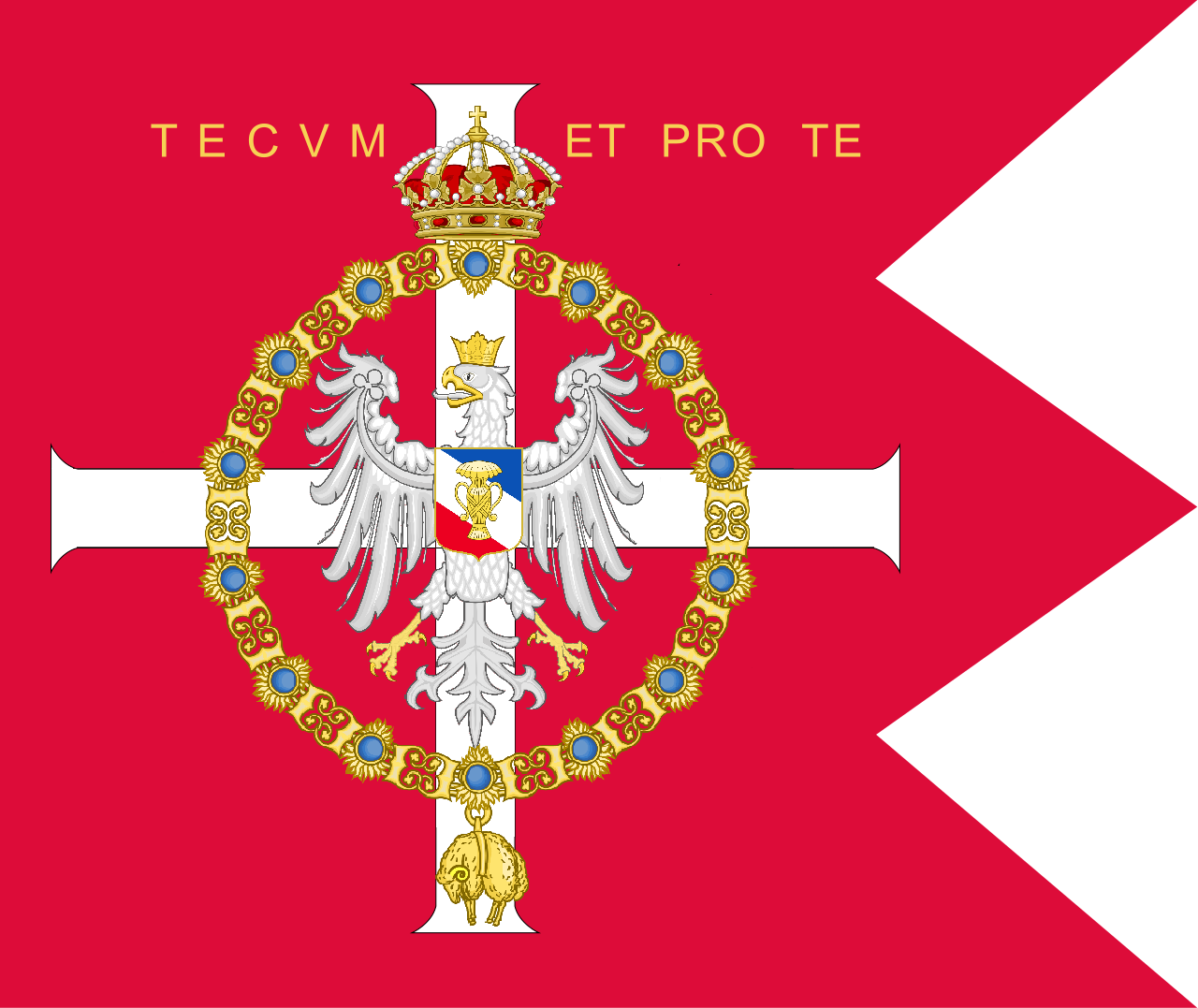
- Royal banner of Sigismund III Vasa (1601-1621), captured in Polish-Swedish War (1655)

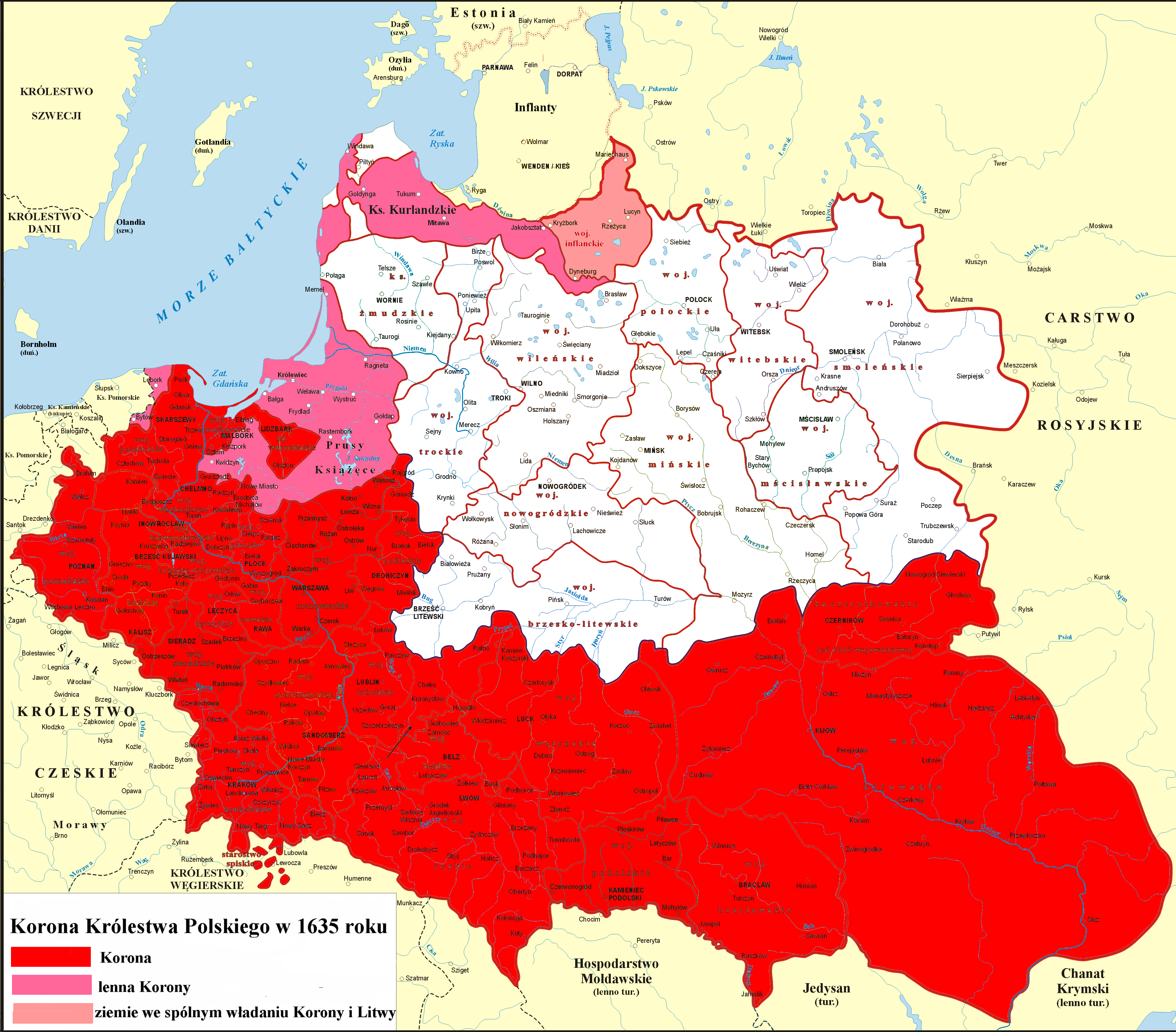
- The Crown of the Kingdom of Poland (red) within the Polish–Lithuanian Commonwealth in 1635. The map also shows the Grand Duchy of Lithuania, Crown fiefs, and territories under joint administration.
- Status: Constituent part of the Polish–Lithuanian Commonwealth
- Capital: Kraków (traditional capital); Warsaw (principal political centre from the late 16th century)
- Government: Mixed monarchy, fully elective from 1573
- Legislature: General Sejm (joint with Lithuania)
  - Upper house: Senate
  - Lower house: Chamber of Deputies
- Historical era: Early modern period
  - Development of the concept of Corona regni: 14th century
  - Union of Lublin: 1 July 1385
  - Constitution of 3 May 1791: 3 May 1791
  - Reciprocal Guarantee of Two Nations: 20 October 1791
  - Third Partition of Poland: 24 October 1795

The Crown of the Kingdom of Poland (Polish: Korona Królestwa Polskiego; Latin: Corona Regni Poloniae), commonly known as the Polish Crown (Polish: Korona Polska), was a political and legal concept that developed in the Kingdom of Poland during the 14th century. It expressed the idea of the kingdom as a permanent political entity, distinct from the person of its reigning monarch and possessing its own rights, institutions, and territories.

The concept emerged during the consolidation of the Polish monarchy under the last Piast kings and acquired particular importance under the Angevin dynasty. It increasingly came to signify the continuity and indivisibility of the kingdom, whose lands and rights could not be freely disposed of by the monarch as personal or dynastic property. The Crown also provided a framework for claims to territories formerly associated with the Polish kingdom but lying outside its contemporary borders.

From the late 14th century, the Crown played an important role in the development of the Polish political community and in relations with the Grand Duchy of Lithuania. Over time, the term also acquired a territorial and institutional meaning, referring to the lands and institutions of the Kingdom of Poland. Following the Union of Lublin in 1569, it commonly designated the Polish constituent part of the Polish–Lithuanian Commonwealth, distinguished from the Grand Duchy of Lithuania. The two retained separate legal, administrative, military, and fiscal institutions while sharing a monarch and a parliament.

== Origins and development of the concept ==
=== The idea of the kingdom during the period of fragmentation ===
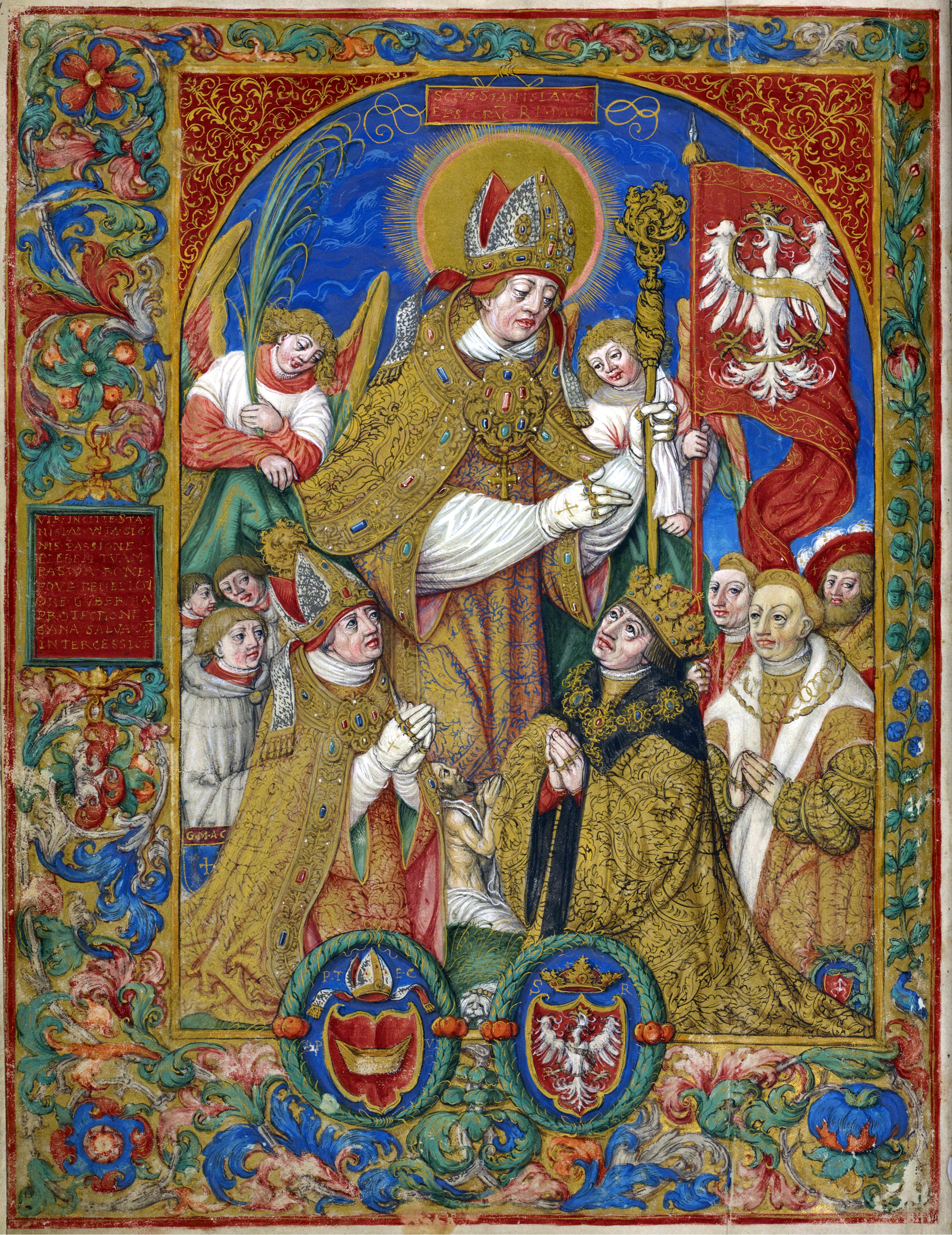
St. Stanislaus of Szczepanów as the patron of the Kingdom of Poland

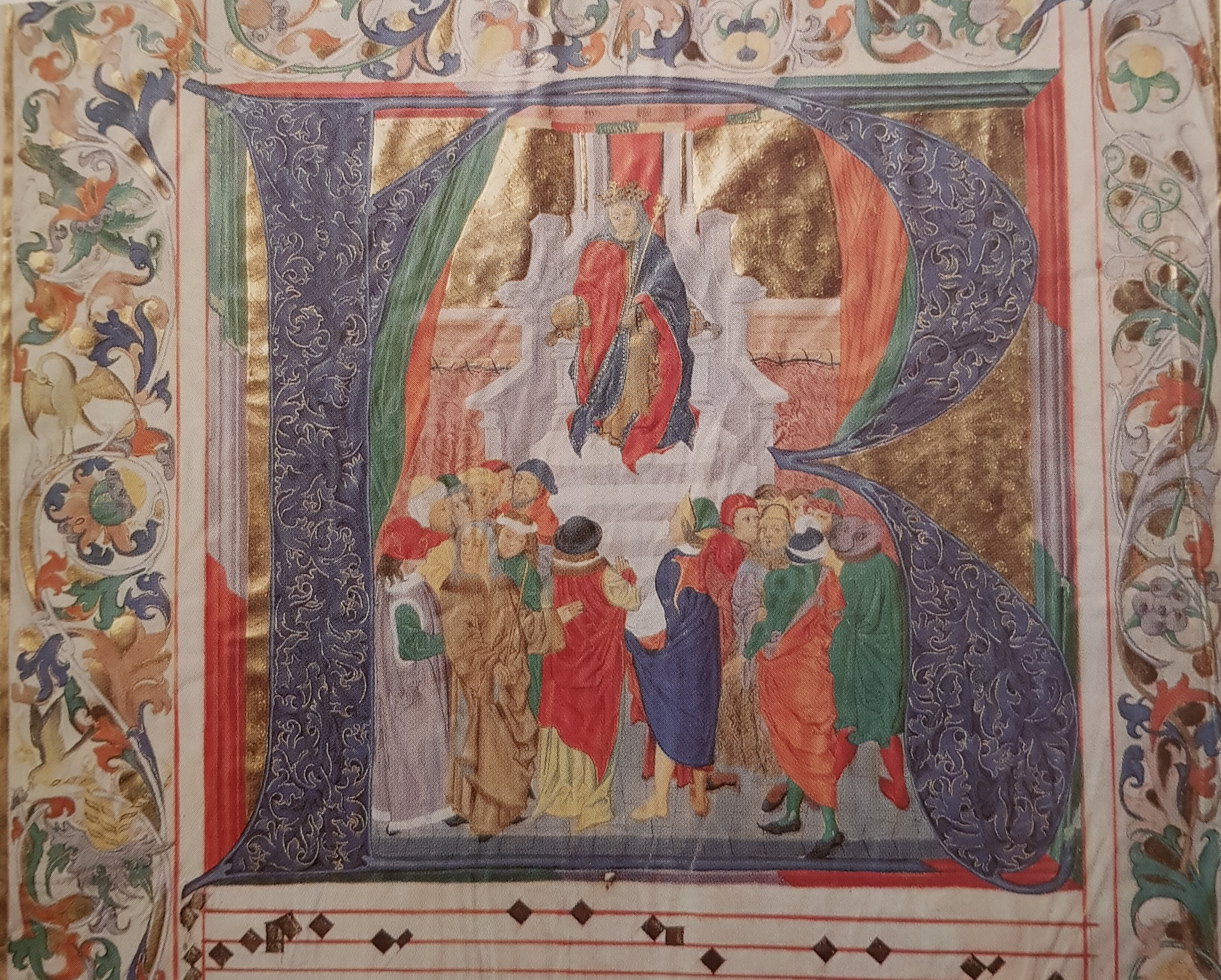
"King in majesty", illumination from the Gradual of John I Albert by Maciej of Drohiczyn, initial "K", ca. 1501.

The history of Poland as an entity has been traditionally traced to c. 966, when the pagan prince Mieszko I and the West Polans adopted Christianity. The Baptism of Poland established the first true Polish state, though the process was begun by Mieszko's Piast ancestors. His son and successor, Bolesław I the Brave, Duke of Poland, became the first crowned King of Poland in 1025. And although his son and successor Mieszko II was forced to relinquish the crown, as was his great-grandson Boleslaw II the Bold, the idea of a kingdom survived. Even during the period of deep partition and the collapse of the central ducal power, Poland was still regarded as a kingdom, and the Piast princes, ruling the various provinces, as members of a royal dynasty and princes of Poland.

A special role was played by Kraków, which was regarded as the main city of the kingdom, as the Wawel Cathedral held the royal jewels. Also important was the cult of Saint Stanislaus Bishop of Kraków, who was presented as the patron saint of the kingdom and its unification. A unified ecclesiastical metropolis headed by the Archbishop of Gniezno also played an important role; its boundaries coincided with those of the kingdom. Gniezno, as the second centre of the state, and the place of coronation, nurtured the cult of the second patron saint, St Adalbert. His influence, however, was less.

In 1295, the Duke of Greater Poland Przemysł II, although his power did not extend to Kraków, was crowned king in Gniezno Cathedral, as the first Piast since 1076. He was, however, assassinated a year later. He was succeeded by Wenceslas II, King of Bohemia, who from 1291 ruled Lesser Poland, conquered Greater Poland and in 1300 was crowned King of Poland in Gniezno. This meant the loss of central power for the Piast dynasty. This situation did not last long, however, as Wenceslas II died in 1305, followed by his son and successor, Wenceslas III, in 1306. The Duke of Kuyavia, Władysław Łokietek, managed to occupy first Lesser Poland and then Greater Poland, and made efforts to be crowned by the Pope. In 1320, the Archbishop of Gniezno crowned him king in Kraków, which formally did not infringe on the rights of the Přemyslids' successor, King John of Bohemia, who still considered himself king of Poland. Władysław's successor Casimir III the Great was also crowned in Kraków in 1333.

Casimir, like his father, considered himself the inherent ruler of the kingdom, the heir of the ancient Bolesławs. He strove to extend his power over the remaining Piast princes and to regain all the lands ruled by the former kings of Poland. The Silesian princes were referred to in Poland as duces Poloniae, although they paid homage to the Bohemian Crown. Casimir also abandoned the coat of arms of the Kuyavia line of the Piasts, a hybrid of eagle and lion, in favour of a crowned white eagle, which was also the symbol of the Kingdom. At the congress of Visegrad in 1335, Casimir bought off John of Bohemia's claims to the title of king of Poland. This allowed for the expansion of the semantic scope of the term "Kingdom of Poland," (Latin: Regnum Poloniae) which was often interpreted in a particularistic manner and limited only to Greater Poland. From that moment, in a territorial sense, it began to denote all the lands currently under the king's rule, and in an ideological sense, all the territories that once belonged to the Piast dynasty. Particularly noteworthy was the situation of Ruthenia, which was conquered by Casimir III. Formally, it was a separate kingdom, on whose throne Casimir sat as the heir of his relative, Yuri II Boleslav of the Piast dynasty.

The king, however, regarded himself as a patrimonial ruler who could freely manage the kingdom and its lands. An expression of this attitude was the appointment of his nephew, King Louis the Great of Hungary, as his successor, rather than any of the numerous male representatives of the Piast dynasty. In his testament, he bequeathed a significant portion of the borderlands to his grandson, Casimir IV, Duke of Pomerania from the House of Griffin. However, the court annulled this provision after Louis's coronation, as it fragmented the kingdom's territory. This was an open challenge to the ruler's claim of having the full freedom to manage the territory and resources of the state.

=== European influences and the restored Polish monarchy ===
The concept of corona regni first emerged in the early 12th century England. By the 13th century, when it had fully developed, the term corona regni Angliae signified the inalienable and enduring royal dignity, authority, and rights, primarily encompassing the king's judicial power and the state as a whole, including territories that had been lost. Similar developments occurred in other European regions, each shaped by local conditions. In France, the term appeared slightly later and initially referred mainly to the royal domain but also extended to the lands held by royal vassals. In Aragon, the Crown denoted a collection of kingdoms and territories united chiefly by their shared ruler, the King of Aragon.

For Poland, the significant development was the emergence of the concept of corona regni in Hungary in the late 12th century. Initially, it represented the kingdom as a territorial entity linked to the Árpád dynasty, heirs to St. Stephen's crown. The shift came with the twilight of the Anjou dynasty, as the diet legitimised the succession through the female line. During the rule of Sigismund of Luxembourg, the Holy Crown was finally distinguished from the King, and the Hungarian estates emphasised the ruler’s obligations to the Crown. By the 15th century, the Crown gained legal personality, standing above both King and Estates, becoming the true sovereign.

In Bohemia, the concept of the corona regni emerged primarily in connection with the territorial expansion and consolidation of the state. The Luxemburg dynasty's unsuccessful pursuit of the Polish throne underscored the necessity of uniting the Silesian principalities with the Bohemian crown. In 1348, Charles IV formalized the feudal structure of the state and introduced the notion of the corona regni Bohemiae, incorporating the Silesian and Upper Lusatian territories bounding them to the perpetual Crown.

=== The Crown under Casimir III and the Angevins ===
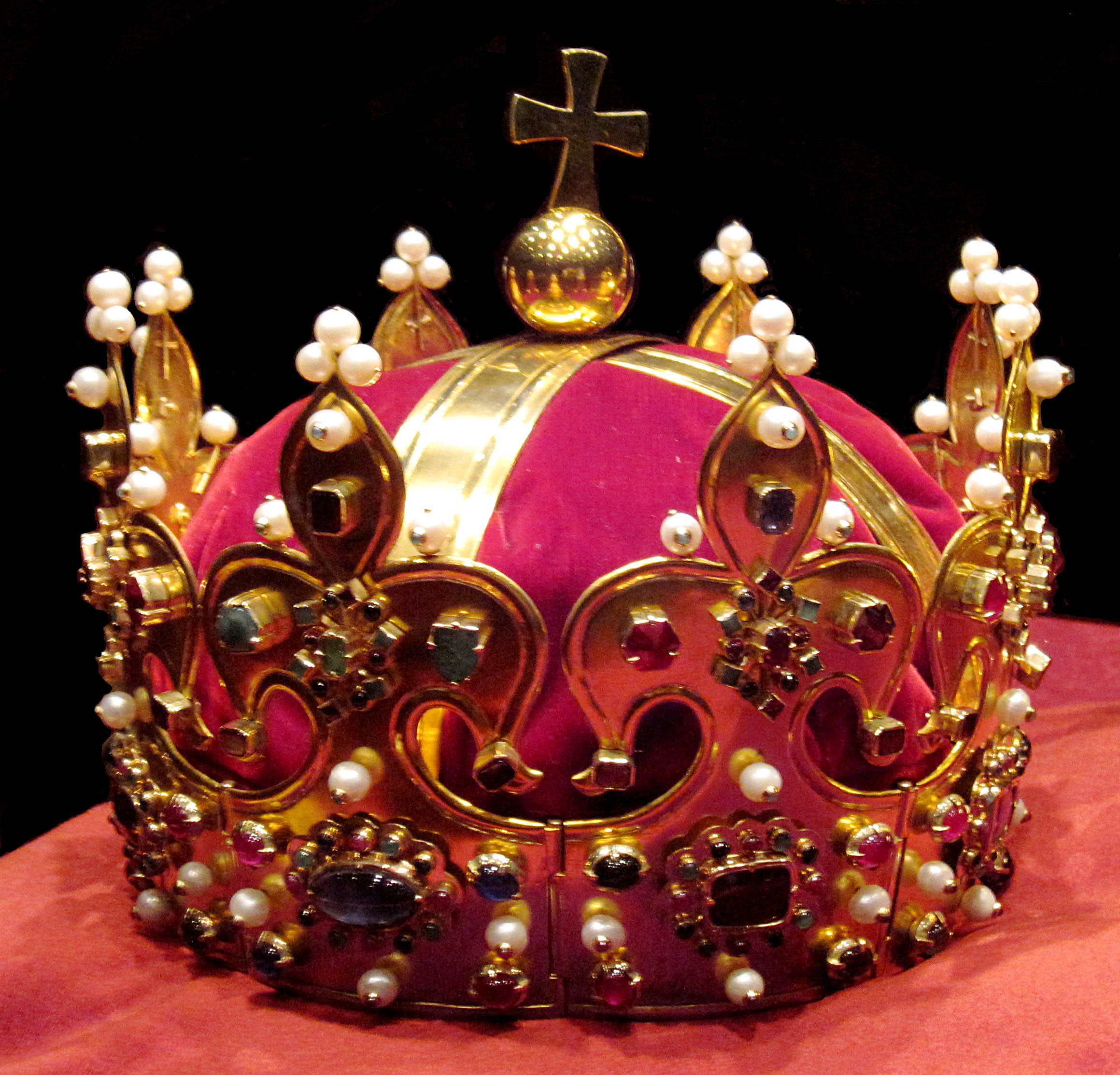
A modern reconstruction of the so-called Crown of Bolesław the Brave, used from 1320 for the coronation of Polish kings. The chronicler Jan Długosz referred to it as the actual crown (coronam materialem) of the Kingdom of Poland, distinguishing it from the conceptual Crown. The crown, along with other regalia, was taken to Hungary by Louis the Great and brought back in 1412 by Władysław Jagiełło. Its return to the country was exceptionally ceremonial.

The concept of Corona Regni appears in the documents of Casimir the Great only three times, and all three documents were produced by foreign chanceries in the king's name. This idea, which limited the monarch's power, gained popularity only after his death. The annulment of Casimir the Great's testament in 1370 was essentially the first act undertaken in the name of the interests of the Crown. Louis was initially inclined to recognise the will, but strong opposition forced him to refer the matter to the court, which ruled that the ruler could not diminish the territory of the Crown of the Kingdom, a decision that Louis accepted. Similarly, the new king, Louis the Great, committed himself to reclaiming the lost territories not for himself, but for the Crown of the Kingdom of Poland, during his coronation. Jan Radlica was the first royal chancellor who stopped referring to himself as chancellor "of Kraków" or "of the court" and began to use in 1381 the title regni Poloniae supremus cancellarius (supreme chancellor of the Kingdom of Poland).

The concept of the Crown being the real sovereign began to be promoted by the elites of Lesser Poland, who saw it as a way to elevate their role. This was facilitated by the rule of a foreign king, the regency in Poland by his mother, Elizabeth, as well as disputes over the succession after his death, which resulted in a woman, Queen Jadwiga, ascending the Polish throne. In the perception of the time, this violated the old laws and required the consent of the lords.

The interregnum following the death of Ludwik in 1382, which ended with the coronation of Jadwiga in 1384, was evidence of the vitality of the Crown of the Kingdom. During this period, the magnates (regnicolae regni Poloniae) managed the affairs of the state, avoiding a bloody civil war and successfully leading to the coronation of the new ruler. Moreover, the basis of power began to rest on an agreement between the dynasty and the kingdom's community. The nobles respected the natural right of Louis's daughters to the throne, but this right was conditional upon adherence to the oaths and obligations made by the ruler to the Crown of the Kingdom.

== The Crown and the Polish–Lithuanian unions ==
=== The Act of Krewo and the early union ===
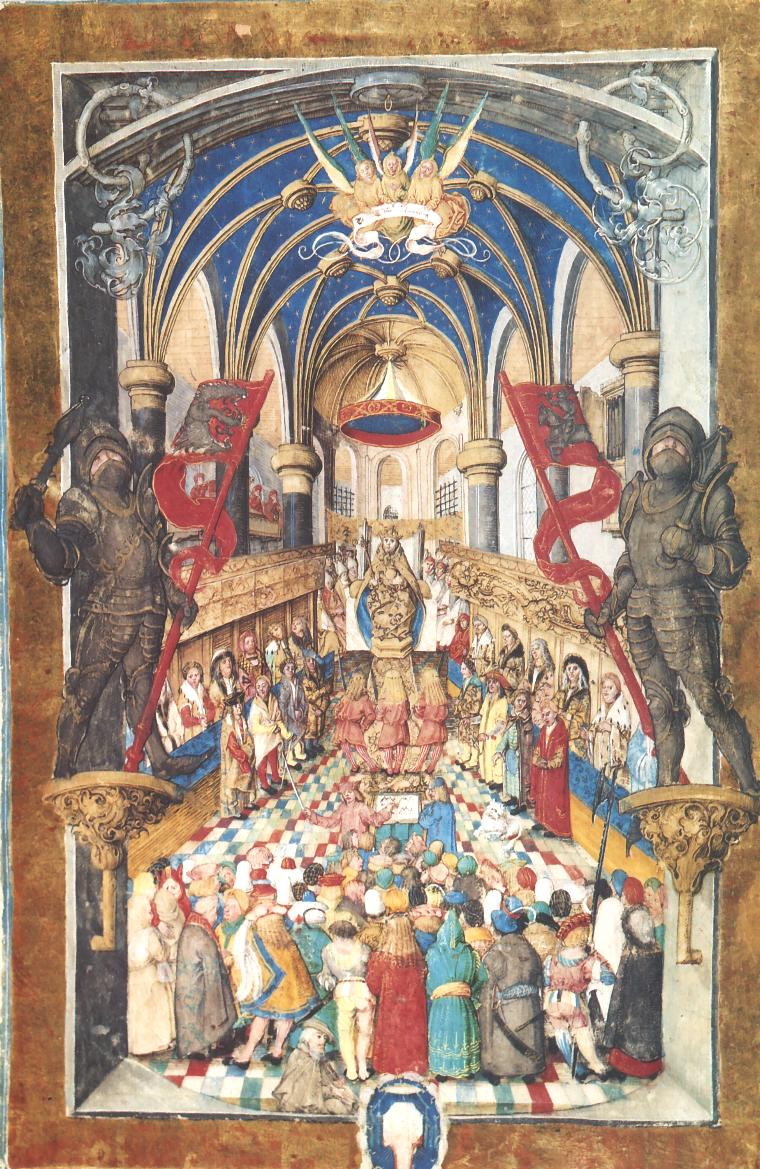
"The King in majesty", miniature from Erazm Ciołek's Pontifical, ca. 1510

The Union of Krewo was a set of prenuptial agreements made at Kreva Castle on 13 August 1385, between Lithuanian Grand Duke Jogaila and Polish lords, who were offering him the hand of Queen Jadwiga of Poland. Once Jogaila confirmed the prenuptial agreements on 14 August 1385, Poland and Lithuania formed a personal union. The agreements included the adoption of Christianity and the repatriation of lands lost by the Crown. Jogaila also pledged to permanently attach his Lithuanian and Ruthenian lands to the Crown of the Kingdom of Poland (terras suas Lithuaniae et Rusie Corone Regni Poloniae perpetuo aplicare), the clause which formed the personal union. After being baptised at the Wawel Cathedral in Kraków on 15 February 1386, Jogaila began to formally use the name Władysław. Three days after his baptism, the marriage between Jadwiga and Władysław II Jagiełło took place. Over the next few years, the Lithuanian princes from the Gediminid dynasty paid homage to Jogaila, himself a Lithuanian and Gediminid, his wife Jadwiga, and the Crown of the Kingdom of Poland.

The union concluded at Krewo was not an ordinary personal union, common in Europe at that time, precisely because one party was the Corona Regni, that is, the community of the Kingdom of Poland, and not a dynasty or ruler, as was the case with the agreement between Casimir the Great and Louis the Great, which elevated the latter to the throne. According to Robert I. Frost, both Jogaila and Jadwiga were elected to the Polish throne by the nobles, having their natural rights to the throne weakened and the power that rested solely on the agreement between them and the Crown of the Kingdom. However, that is contradicted by the fact Jadwiga was viewed as hereditary monarch – "naturally-enthroned" and "inherent" Lady of the Kingdom (pl: "pani naturalna/pani przyrodzona królestwa"), as an heir to both Anjou and Piast dynasties on the virtue of being daughter of the previous King. While her ascension needed to be approved by nobles because of lack of precedence for the female succession in Poland, after being accepted the Queen was viewed as unquestioned bearer of the hereditary rights to the Polish throne, and any legitimate child born to her would be the heir of the Crown. Jadwiga and her only daughter, Princess Elizabeth, both died in 1399, thus ending the line of succession. Jogaila and his future descendants were to remain monarchs over Poland as elective rulers.

Frost believes the aim of the Union of Krewo was not the annexation of Lithuania by Poland, but its incorporation into the community of the kingdom, that is, the Crown. Nevertheless, the Union of Krewo did not abolish the statehood of the Grand Duchy of Lithuania. On 4 August 1392, the Ostrów Agreement was concluded between Jogaila and Vytautas the Great, who agreed to rule Vilnius, the capital city of Lithuania, as regent of Jogaila and to remain a vassal of the Polish King, however while ruling Vilnius and its region Vytautas the Great was not content with the duties of a regent, but acquired the factual authority of the Grand Duke, which was eventually recognized by treaties. The personal union was terminated in 1440 when Casimir IV Jagiellon was elevated as the sovereign Grand Duke of Lithuania and subsequently he stressed himself as a "free lord" (pan – dominus).

=== The Crown under the Jagiellonians ===
In 1444, following the death of Władysław III of Poland during the Battle of Varna, the Polish nobles invited his younger brother Casimir IV Jagiellon to also become the King of Poland and sought to renew the Polish–Lithuanian union. Casimir IV Jagiellon, taking into account the demands of the Lithuanian nobility, accepted the Polish offer only under the conditions that it will be a union of states with equal rights (personal union) and was crowned on 25 June 1447.

Following the death of Casimir IV Jagiellon, the Polish nobility elected his son John I Albert as the new King of Poland in August 1492, while the Lithuanian Council of Lords sought for a separate monarch from Poland and in July 1492 they elected Alexander Jagiellon as the new Grand Duke of Lithuania, which meant another termination of the personal union. In 1501, Alexander Jagiellon was elected as the King of Poland after his brother John I Albert's death. In 1501, Alexander Jagiellon and some members of the Lithuanian Council of Lords concluded the Union of Mielnik which stated that the Kingdom of Poland and the Grand Duchy of Lithuania merge into one political unit (indivisible body), however the Union of Mielnik faced an opposition of influential Lithuanian nobles (Radziwiłłs, Goštautai, Michael Glinski) and in 1505 the Sejm of the Grand Duchy of Lithuania rejected the Union of Mielnik as an agreement that narrows the Lithuania's independence and for which the representatives of the Grand Duchy of Lithuania did not have the authority of the Sejm.

In 1506, Alexander Jagiellon died and the Lithuanian nobles arbitrarily elected his brother Sigismund I the Old as the new Grand Duke of Lithuania, this way ignoring the stipulations of the 1501 Union of Mielnik to elect a common monarch of Poland and Lithuania. The Polish nobles, seeking to preserve the Polish–Lithuanian union, also elected Sigismund I the Old as the King of Poland in 1506. In 1529, Sigismund I the Old declared his son Sigismund II Augustus as a successor to the Lithuanian throne and on 18 October 1529 Sigismund II Augustus was inaugurated as the Grand Duke of Lithuania in the Vilnius' Grand Ducal Palace, while the same year on 18 December Sigismund II Augustus was also named King of Poland alongside his father. Initially, Sigismund II Augustus opposed the Polish–Lithuanian union as he sought to leave Polish and Lithuanian thrones to his descendants, however as the Livonian War with the Tsardom of Russia progressed Sigismund II Augustus began to seek a union of Poland and Lithuania.

=== The Union of Lublin ===
Banner of Poland and Lithuania in the chronicle of the Council of Constance (1416)

The Union of Lublin created the single state of the Polish–Lithuanian Commonwealth on 1 July 1569 with a real union between the Crown and the Grand Duchy of Lithuania. Before then, the Crown of the Kingdom of Poland and the Grand Duchy of Lithuania only had a personal union. By concluding the 1569 Union of Lublin, the Crown of the Kingdom of Poland and the Grand Duchy of Lithuania retained separate territories, armies, treasuries and most other official institutions, but were ruled by a single monarch and a joint Sejm of the Polish–Lithuanian Commonwealth was established. The Union of Lublin also made the Crown an elective monarchy; this ended the Jagiellonian dynasty once Henry de Valois was elected on 16 May 1573 as monarch.

On 30 May 1574, two months after Henry de Valois was crowned King of Poland and Grand Duke of Lithuania on 22 February 1574, he was made King of France, and was crowned King of France on 13 February 1575. He left the throne of the Crown on 12 May 1575, two months after he was crowned King of France. In order to replace him, Anna Jagiellon and her husband-to-be Stephen Báthory were elected during the 1576 Polish–Lithuanian royal election.

On 28 January 1588, Sigismund III Vasa confirmed the Third Statute of Lithuania in which it was stated that the Polish–Lithuanian Commonwealth is a federation of two countries – the Kingdom of Poland and the Grand Duchy of Lithuania where both countries have equal rights within it.

=== Constitution of 1791 ===
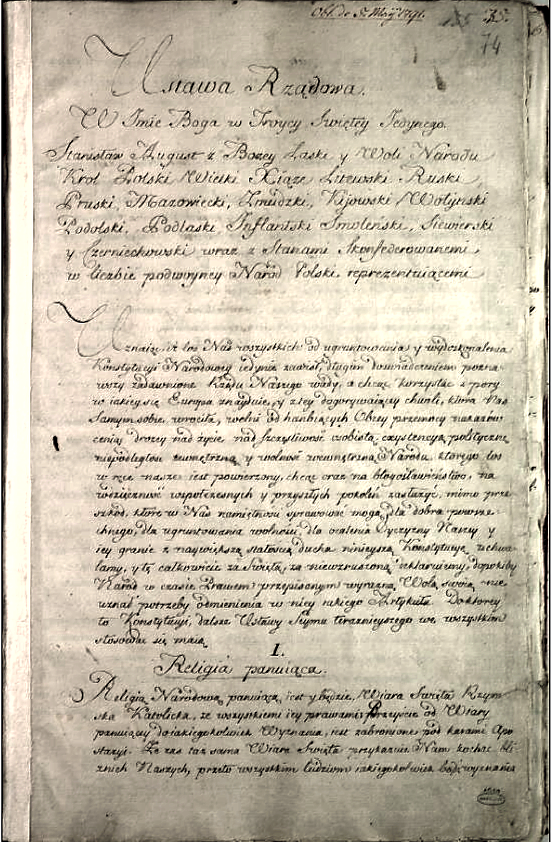
First page of the original Constitution

The Constitution of 3 May 1791 is the second-oldest, codified national constitution in history, and the oldest codified national constitution in Europe; the oldest being the United States Constitution. It was called the Government Act (Ustawa Rządowa). Drafting for it began on 6 October 1788 and lasted 32 months. Stanisław II Augustus was the principal author of the Constitution, and he wanted the Crown to be a constitutional monarchy, similar to the one in Great Britain. On 3 May 1791, the Great Sejm convened, and they read and adopted the new constitution. It enfranchised the bourgeoisie, separated the government into three branches, abolished liberum veto, and stopped the abuses of the Repnin Sejm.

It made Poland a constitutional monarchy with the King as the head of the executive branch with his cabinet of ministers, called the Guardians of the Laws. The legislative branch was bicameral with an elected Sejm and an appointed Senate; the King was given the power to break ties in the Senate, and the head of the Sejm was the Sejm Marshal. The Crown Tribunal, the highest appellate court in the Crown, was reformed. The Sejm would elect its judges for the Sejm Court (the Crown's parliamentary court) from its deputies (posłowie).

The Government Act angered Catherine II, who believed that Poland needed permission from the Russian Empire for any political reform; she argued that Poland had fallen prey to radical Jacobinism that was prominent in France at the time. Russia invaded the Commonwealth in 1792. The Constitution was in place for less than 19 months; it was annulled by the Grodno Sejm.

== The Crown within the Polish–Lithuanian Commonwealth ==
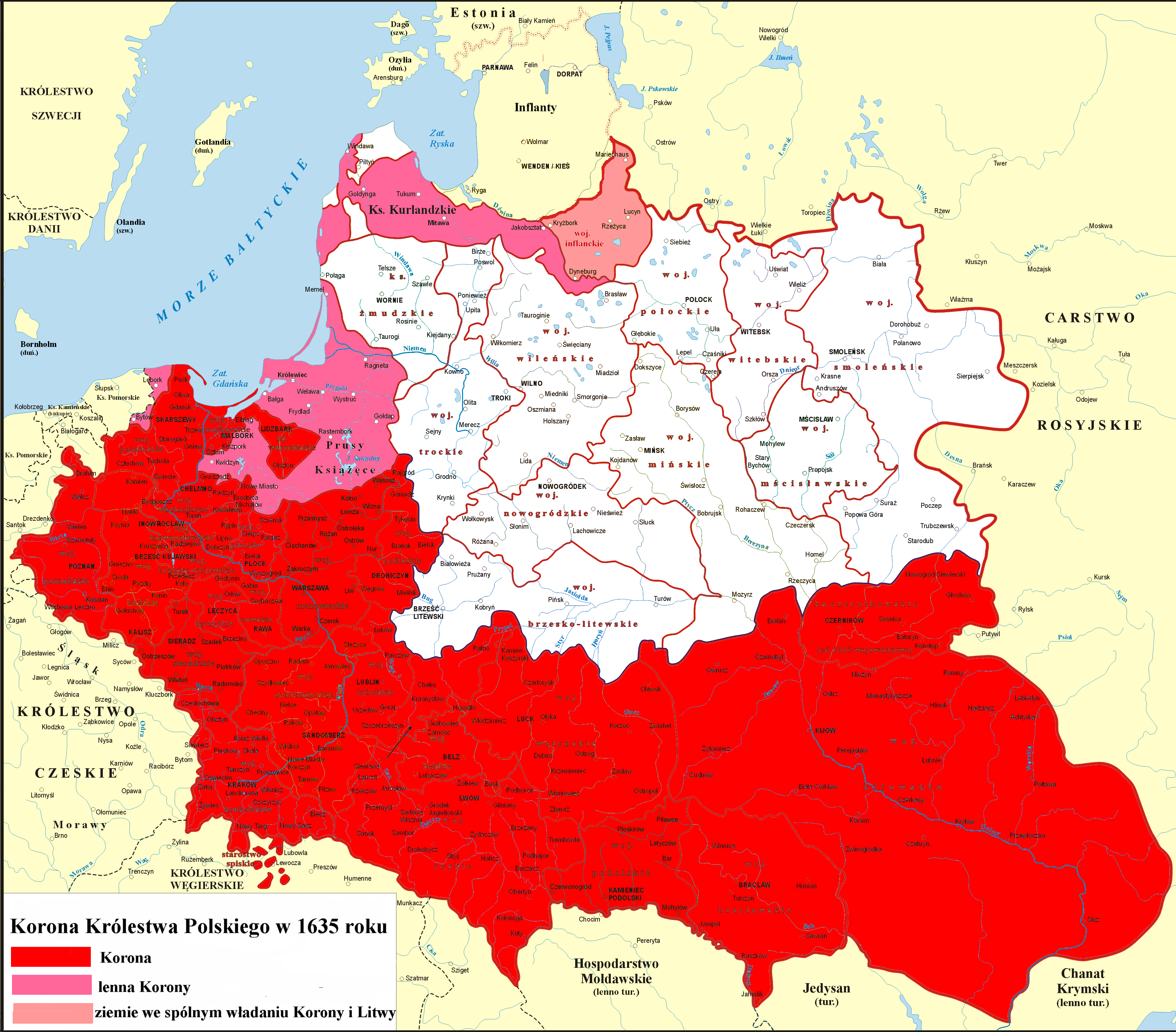
Crown of the Kingdom of Poland, 1635

=== Institutions and political system ===
The creation of the Crown of the Kingdom of Poland was a milestone in the evolution of Polish statehood and the European identity. It represented the concept of the Polish kingdom (nation) as distinctly separate from the person of the monarch. The introduction of the concept marked the transformation of the Polish government from a patrimonial monarchy (a hereditary monarchy) to a "quasi-constitutional monarchy" (monarchia stanowa) in which power resided in the nobility, the clergy and (to some extent) the working class, also referred to as an "elective monarchy".

A related concept that evolved soon afterwards was that of Rzeczpospolita ("Commonwealth"), which was an alternative to the Crown as a name for the Polish state after the Treaty of Lublin in 1569. The Crown of the Kingdom of Poland was also related to other symbols of Poland, such as the capital (Kraków), the Polish coat of arms and the flag of Poland.

=== Territorial organization ===
After the Union of Lublin (1569) Crown lands were divided into two provinces: Lesser Poland (Polish: Małopolska) and Greater Poland (Polish: Wielkopolska). These were further divided into administrative units known as voivodeships (the Polish names of the voivodships and towns are shown below in parentheses).

Greater Poland Province:

- Brześć Kujawski Voivodeship (województwo brzesko-kujawskie, Brześć Kujawski)
- Gniezno Voivodeship (województwo gnieźnieńskie, Gniezno) from 1768
- Inowrocław Voivodeship (województwo inowrocławskie, Inowrocław)
- Kalisz Voivodeship (województwo kaliskie, Kalisz)
- Łęczyca Voivodeship (województwo łęczyckie, Łęczyca)
- Mazovian Voivodeship (województwo mazowieckie, of Mazowsze, Warsaw)
- Poznań Voivodeship (województwo poznańskie, Poznań)
- Płock Voivodeship (województwo płockie, Płock)
- Podlaskie Voivodeship (województwo podlaskie, Drohiczyn)
- Rawa Voivodeship (województwo rawskie, Rawa)
- Sieradz Voivodeship (województwo sieradzkie, Sieradz)
- Prince-Bishopric of Warmia

Lesser Poland Province:

- Bełz Voivodeship (województwo bełzkie, Bełz)
- Bracław Voivodeship (województwo bracławskie, Bracław)
- Czernihów Voivodeship (województwo czernihowskie, Czernihów)
- Kijów Voivodeship (województwo kijowskie, Kijów)
- Kraków Voivodeship (województwo krakowskie, Kraków)
- Lublin Voivodeship (województwo lubelskie, Lublin)
- Podole Voivodeship (województwo podolskie, Kamieniec Podolski)
- Ruś Voivodeship (województwo ruskie, Lwów)
- Sandomierz Voivodeship (województwo sandomierskie, Sandomierz)
- Wołyń Voivodeship (województwo wołyńskie, Łuck)
- Duchy of Siewierz (Siewierz)

Royal Prussia (Polish: Prusy Królewskie) was a semi-autonomous province of the Polish–Lithuanian Commonwealth from 1569 to 1772. Royal Prussia included Pomerelia, Chełmno Land (Kulmerland), Malbork Voivodeship (Marienburg), Gdańsk (Danzig), Toruń (Thorn), and Elbląg (Elbing). Polish historian Henryk Wisner writes that Royal Prussia belonged to the Province of Greater Poland.

=== Fiefs and territories with special status ===
The Crown and the Grand Duchy of Lithuania 1386–1434

==== Principality of Moldavia (1387–1497) ====
The history of Moldavia has long been intertwined with that of Poland. The Polish chronicler Jan Długosz mentioned Moldavians (under the name Wallachians) as having joined a military expedition in 1342, under King Władysław I, against the Margraviate of Brandenburg. The Polish state was powerful enough to counter the Hungarian Kingdom, which was consistently interested in bringing the area that would become Moldavia into its political orbit.

Ties between Poland and Moldavia expanded after the Polish annexation of Galicia in the aftermath of the Galicia–Volhynia Wars and the founding of the Moldavian state by Bogdan of Cuhea. Bogdan, a Vlach voivode from Maramureș who had fallen out with the Hungarian king, crossed the Carpathian Mountains in 1359, took control of Moldavia, and succeeded in transforming it into an independent political entity. Despite being disfavored by the brief union of Angevin Poland and Hungary (the latter was still the country's overlord), Bogdan's successor Lațcu, the Moldavian ruler, also likely allied himself with the Poles. Lațcu also accepted conversion to Roman Catholicism around 1370, but his gesture was to remain without lasting consequences.

Petru I profited from the end of the Hungarian-Polish union and moved the country closer to the Jagiellon realm, becoming a vassal of Władysław II on 26 September 1387. This gesture was to have unexpected consequences: Petru supplied the Polish ruler with funds needed in the war against the Teutonic Knights, and was granted control over Pokuttya until the debt was to be repaid; as this is not recorded to have been carried out, the region became disputed by the two states, until it was lost by Moldavia in the Battle of Obertyn (1531). Prince Petru also expanded his rule southwards to the Danube Delta. His brother Roman I conquered the Hungarian-ruled Cetatea Albă in 1392, giving Moldavia an outlet to the Black Sea, before being toppled from the throne for supporting Fyodor Koriatovych in his conflict with Vytautas the Great of Lithuania. Under Stephen I, growing Polish influence was challenged by Sigismund of Hungary, whose expedition was defeated at Ghindăoani in 1385; however, Stephen disappeared in mysterious circumstances.

Although Alexander I was brought to the throne in 1400 by the Hungarians (with assistance from Mircea I of Wallachia), this ruler shifted his allegiances towards Poland (notably engaging Moldavian forces on the Polish side in the Battle of Grunwald and the Siege of Marienburg) in 1410, and placed his own choice of rulers in Wallachia. His reign was one of the most successful in Moldavia's history, but also saw the first confrontation with the Ottoman Turks at Cetatea Albă in 1420, and later even a conflict with the Poles. A deep crisis was to follow Alexandru's long reign, with his successors battling each other in a succession of wars that divided the country until the murder of Bogdan II and the ascension of Peter III Aaron in 1451. Nevertheless, Moldavia was subject to further Hungarian interventions after that moment, as Matthias Corvinus deposed Aron and backed Alexăndrel to the throne in Suceava. Petru Aron's rule also signified the beginning of Moldavia's Ottoman Empire allegiance, as the ruler agreed to pay tribute to Sultan Mehmed II.

The principality of Moldavia covered the entire geographic region of Moldavia. In various periods, various other territories were politically connected with the Moldavian principality. This is the case of the province of Pokuttya, the fiefdoms of Cetatea de Baltă and Ciceu (both in Transylvania) or, at a later date, the territories between the Dniester and the Bug rivers.

==== Towns in Spisz County (1412–1795) ====
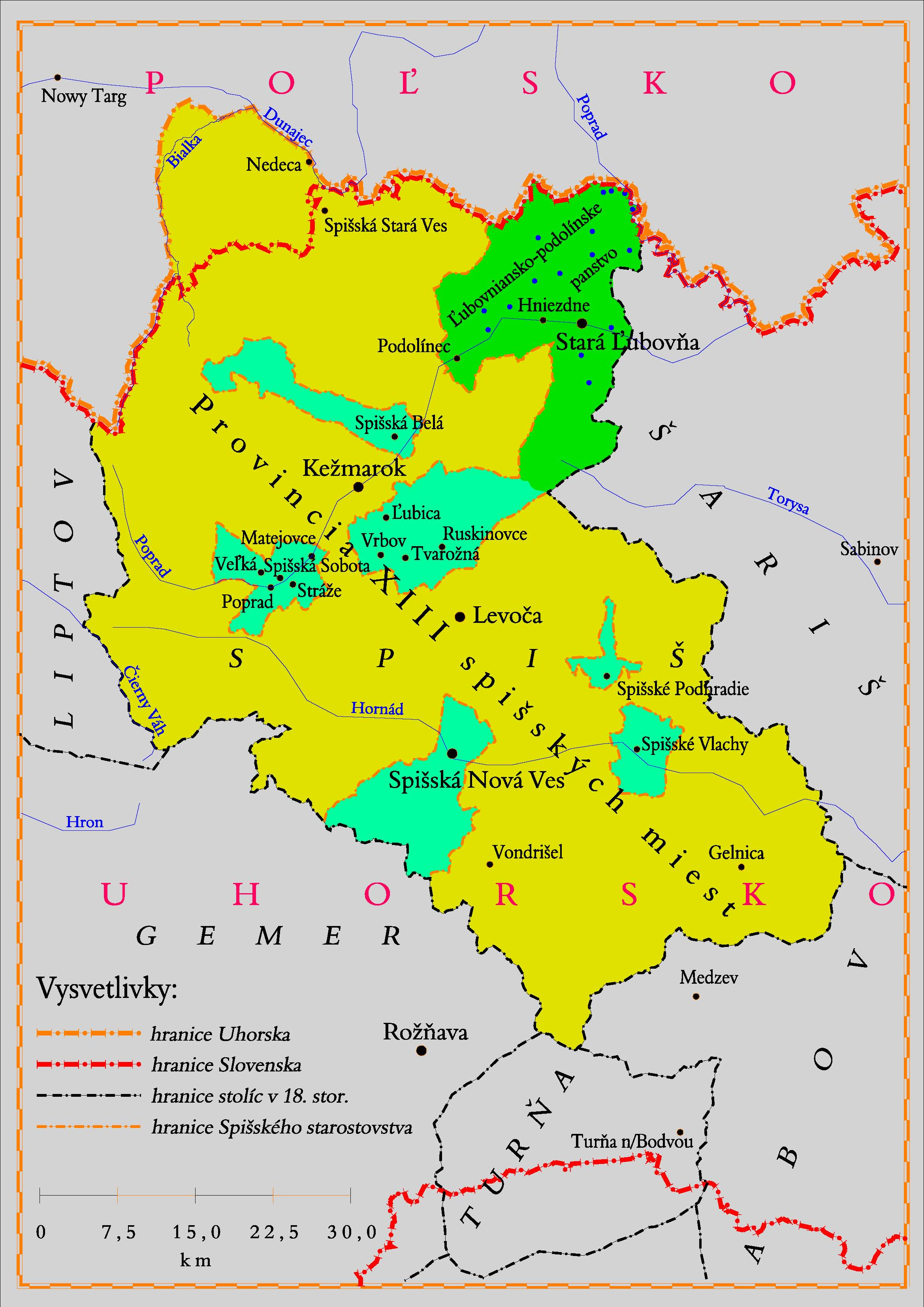
The Spiš (Zips) region. Light blue and green areas show the pawned territories, red line shows current borders, yellow former border between then Hungary and Poland and the black borders between counties

As one of the terms of the Treaty of Lubowla, the Hungarian crown exchanged, for a loan of sixty times the amount of 37,000 Prague groschen (approximately seven tonnes of pure silver), 16 rich salt-producing towns in the area of Spisz (Zips), as well as a right to incorporate them into Poland until the debt was repaid. The towns affected were: Biała, Lubica, Wierzbów, Spiska Sobota, Poprad, Straże, Spiskie Włochy, Nowa Wieś, Spiska Nowa Wieś, Ruszkinowce, Wielka, Spiskie Podgrodzie, Maciejowce, Twarożne.

==== Duchy of Siewierz (1443–1795) ====
Wenceslaus I sold the Duchy of Siewierz to the Archbishop of Kraków, Zbigniew Cardinal Oleśnicki, for 6,000 silver groats in 1443. After that point it was considered to be associated with the Lesser Poland Province and was the only ecclesiastical duchy in Lesser Poland. The junction of the duchy with the Lesser Poland Province was concluded in 1790 when the Great Sejm formally incorporated the Duchy, as part of the Crown of the Kingdom of Poland, into the Polish–Lithuanian Commonwealth.

==== Prince-Bishopric of Warmia (1466–1772) ====
The Prince-Bishopric of Warmia (Polish: Biskupie Księstwo Warmińskie,) was a semi independent ecclesiastical state, ruled by the incumbent ordinary of the Roman Catholic Archdiocese of Warmia, and a protectorate of Kingdom of Poland, later part of the Polish–Lithuanian Commonwealth after the Peace of Thorn (1466–1772)

==== Lauenburg and Bütow Land ====
After the childless death of the last of the House of Pomerania, Bogislaw XIV in 1637, Lauenburg and Bütow Land again became a terra (land, ziemia) of the Crown of the Kingdom of Poland. In 1641 it became part of the Pomeranian Voivodeship of the Polish–Lithuanian Commonwealth. After the 1657 Treaty of Bydgoszcz, which amended the Treaty of Wehlau, it was granted to the Hohenzollern dynasty of Brandenburg-Prussia in return for her help against Sweden in the Swedish-Polish War under the same favorable conditions the House of Pomerania had enjoyed before. Lauenburg and Bütow Land was officially a Polish fiefdom until the First Partition of Poland in 1772 when King Frederick II of Prussia incorporated the territory into Prussia and the subsequent Treaty of Warsaw in 1773 made the former conditions obsolete.

==== Duchy of Courland and Semigallia (Courland) (1562–1791) ====
The Duchy of Courland and Semigallia is a duchy in the Baltic region that existed from 1562 to 1791 as a vassal state of the Grand Duchy of Lithuania and later the Polish–Lithuanian Commonwealth. In 1791, it gained full independence, but on 28 March 1795, it was annexed by the Russian Empire in the Third Partition of Poland. The duchy also had colonies in Tobago and Gambia.

==== Duchy of Prussia ====
The Duchy of Prussia was a duchy in the eastern part of Prussia from 1525 to 1701. In 1525, during the Protestant Reformation, the Grand Master of the Teutonic Knights, Albert of Hohenzollern, secularised the Prussian State of the Teutonic Order, becoming Albert, Duke in Prussia. His duchy, which had its capital in Königsberg (Kaliningrad), was established as a fief of the Crown of Poland, as had been Teutonic Prussia since the Second Peace of Thorn in October 1466. This treaty had ended the War of the Cities or Thirteen Years' War and provided for the Order's cession of its rights over the western half of its territories to the Polish crown, which became the province of Royal Prussia, while the remaining part of the Order's land became a fief of the Kingdom of Poland (1385–1569). In the 17th century, King John II Casimir of Poland submitted Frederick William to regain Prussian suzerainty in return for supporting Poland against Sweden. On 29 July 1657, they signed the Treaty of Wehlau in Wehlau (Polish: Welawa; now Znamensk), whereby Frederick William renounced a previous Swedish-Prussian alliance and John Casimir recognised Frederick William's full sovereignty over the Duchy of Prussia. Full sovereignty was a necessary prerequisite for upgrading the Duchy to the Kingdom of Prussia in 1701.

==== Duchy of Livonia (1569–1772) ====
The Duchy of Livonia was a territory of the Grand Duchy of Lithuania – and later a joint domain (Condominium) of the Polish Crown and the Grand Duchy of Lithuania.

== See also ==
- Administrative division of the Polish–Lithuanian Commonwealth
- Lands of the Crown of Saint Stephen
- Lands of the Crown of Saint Wenceslaus

== Bibliography ==
- Dąbrowski, Jan (1956). Korona Królestwa Polskiego w XIV wieku. Studium z dziejów rozwoju polskiej monarchii stanowej (in Polish). Zakład im. Ossolińskich.
- Frost, Robert (2015). The Oxford History of Poland-Lithuania. The Making of the Polish-Lithuanian Union, 1385–1569. Oxford: Oxford University Press. ISBN 978-0-19-820869-3.
- Jan Herburt, Statuta Regni Poloniae: in ordinem alphabeti digesta, Cracoviae (Kraków) 1563.
- Henryk Litwin, Central European Superpower, BUM Magazine, October 2016.
- Szczur, Stanisław (2002). Historia Polski. Średniowiecze. Kraków: Wydawnictwo Literackie. ISBN 978-83-08-03272-5.
