= Pętkowice, Świętokrzyskie Voivodeship =

Pętkowice
- Village
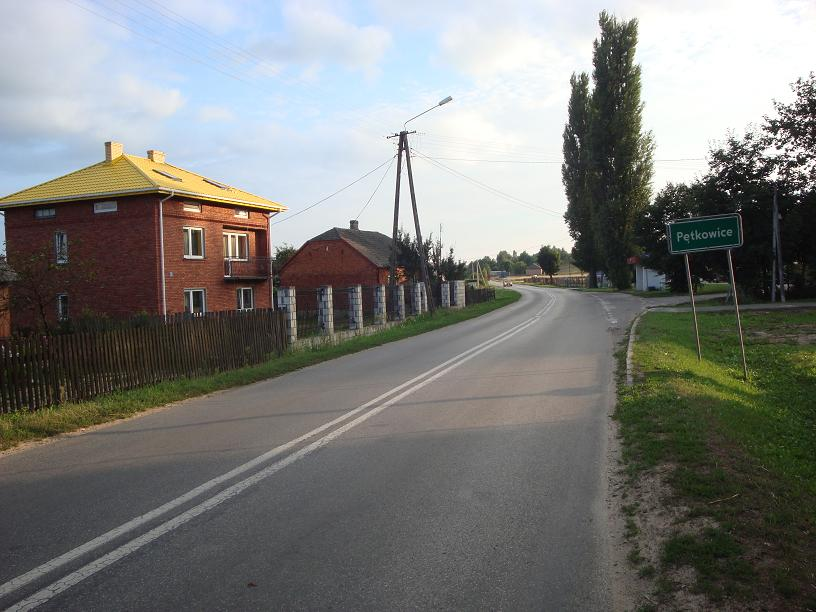

- Location within Poland
- Coordinates: 51°0′45″N 21°36′4″E
- Country: Poland
- Voivodeship: Świętokrzyskie
- County: Ostrowiec
- Gmina: Bałtów
- Population: 200
- Post Code: 27-243
- Area code: (+48) 41
- Vehicle registration: TOS

Pętkowice [pɛntkɔˈvit͡sɛ] is a village in the administrative district of Gmina Bałtów, within Ostrowiec County, Świętokrzyskie Voivodeship, in south-central Poland. It lies approximately 4 km (2 mi) east of Bałtów, 17 km (11 mi) north-east of Ostrowiec Świętokrzyski, and 71 km (44 mi) east of the regional capital Kielce.
