= Wólka Bałtowska =

- Village
- Location within Poland
- Coordinates: 51°1′58″N 21°31′42″E
- Country: Poland
- Voivodeship: Świętokrzyskie
- County: Ostrowiec
- Gmina: Bałtów
- Population: 230

Wólka Bałtowska [ˈvulka bau̯ˈtɔfska] is a village in the administrative district of Gmina Bałtów, in Ostrowiec County, Świętokrzyskie Voivodeship, in south-central Poland. It lies approximately 3 km (2 mi) north-west of Bałtów, 15 km (9 mi) north-east of Ostrowiec Świętokrzyski, and 67 km (42 mi) east of the regional capital Kielce.
