= Okół =

Okół may refer to the following places in Poland:

- Okół, Podlaskie Voivodeship
- Okół, Świętokrzyskie Voivodeship
- Okół, part of the Stare Miasto district of Kraków
