= Skarbka =

- Village
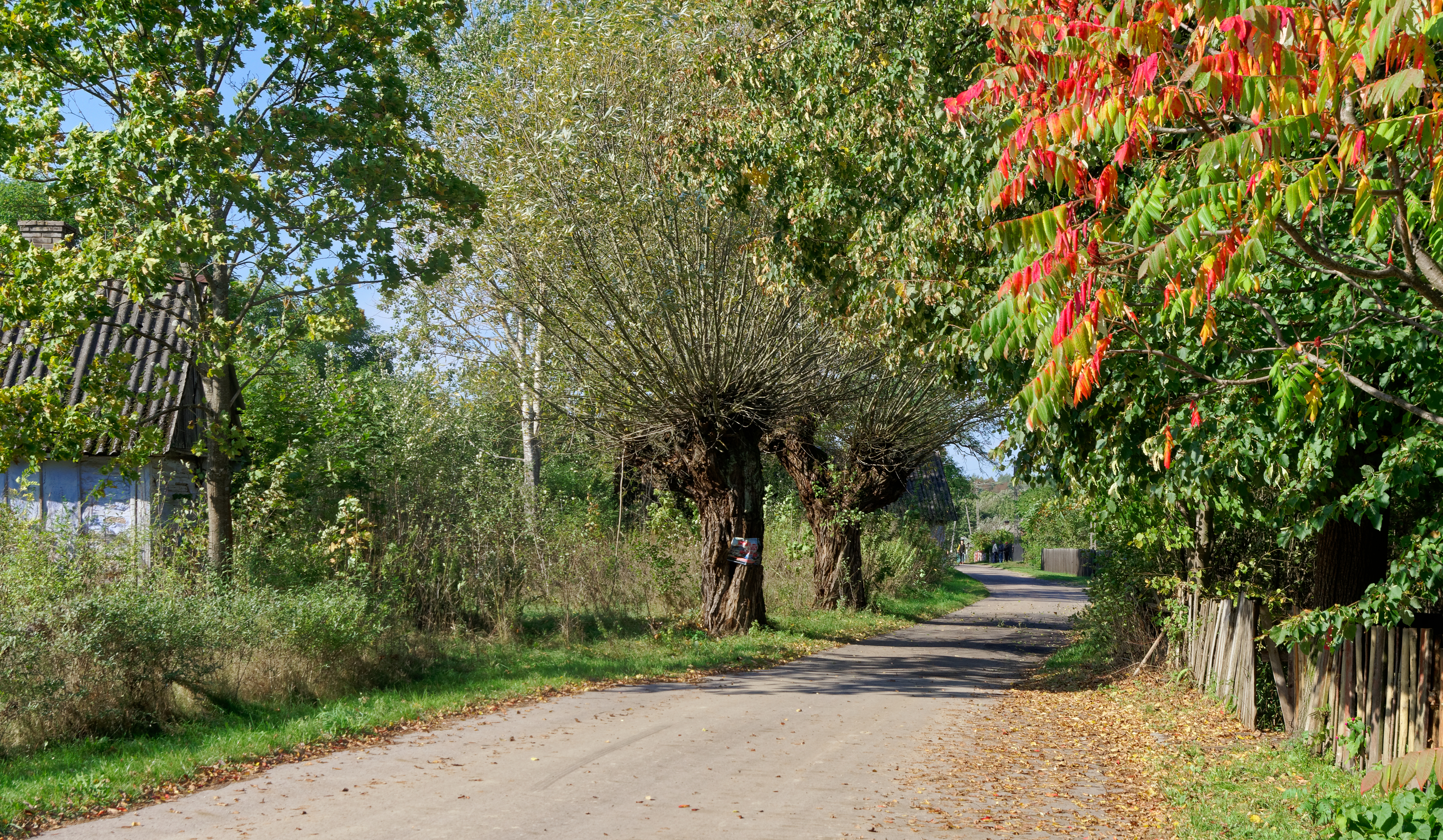

- Location within Poland
- Coordinates: 51°0′43″N 21°34′40″E
- Country: Poland
- Voivodeship: Świętokrzyskie
- County: Ostrowiec
- Gmina: Bałtów
- Population: 190

Skarbka [ˈskarpka] is a village in the administrative district of Gmina Bałtów, within Ostrowiec County, Świętokrzyskie Voivodeship, in south-central Poland. It lies approximately 3 km (2 mi) east of Bałtów, 16 km (10 mi) north-east of Ostrowiec Świętokrzyski, and 69 km (43 mi) east of the regional capital Kielce.
