= Znamensky (rural locality) =

Znamensky (Russian: Зна́менский; masculine), Znamenskaya (Зна́менская; feminine), or Znamenskoye (Зна́менское; neuter) is the name of several rural localities in Russia.

== Chechen Republic ==
As of 2010, one rural locality in the Chechen Republic bears this name:

- Znamenskoye, Chechen Republic, a selo in Znamenskaya Rural Administration of Nadterechny District

== Kaliningrad Oblast ==
As of 2010, two rural localities in Kaliningrad Oblast bear this name:

- Znamenskoye, Bagrationovsky District, Kaliningrad Oblast, a settlement in Gvardeysky Rural Okrug of Bagrationovsky District
- Znamenskoye, Pravdinsky District, Kaliningrad Oblast, a settlement in Domnovsky Rural Okrug of Pravdinsky District

== Kemerovo Oblast ==
As of 2010, one rural locality in Kemerovo Oblast bears this name:

- Znamensky, Kemerovo Oblast, a settlement in Osinogrivskaya Rural Territory of Topkinsky District

== Krasnodar Krai ==
As of 2010, one rural locality in Krasnodar Krai bears this name:

- Znamensky, Krasnodar Krai, a settlement in Pashkovsky Rural Okrug under the administrative jurisdiction of the City of Krasnodar

== Kursk Oblast ==
As of 2010, two rural localities in Kursk Oblast bear this name:

- Znamensky, Kursk Oblast, a settlement in Vyshnedubovetsky Selsoviet of Medvensky District
- Znamenskoye, Kursk Oblast, a selo in Shchegolyansky Selsoviet of Belovsky District

== Lipetsk Oblast ==
As of 2010, three rural localities in Lipetsk Oblast bear this name:

- Znamenskoye, Izmalkovsky District, Lipetsk Oblast, a selo in Vasilyevsky Selsoviet of Izmalkovsky District
- Znamenskoye, Lev-Tolstovsky District, Lipetsk Oblast, a selo in Znamensky Selsoviet of Lev-Tolstovsky District
- Znamenskaya, Lipetsk Oblast, a village in Balovnevsky Selsoviet of Dankovsky District

== Mari El Republic ==
As of 2010, one rural locality in the Mari El Republic bears this name:

- Znamensky, Mari El Republic, a settlement in Znamensky Rural Okrug of Medvedevsky District

== Republic of Mordovia ==
As of 2010, two rural localities in the Republic of Mordovia bear this name:

- Znamenskoye, Atyashevsky District, Republic of Mordovia, a selo in Pokrovsky Selsoviet of Atyashevsky District
- Znamenskoye, Chamzinsky District, Republic of Mordovia, a selo in Michurinsky Selsoviet of Chamzinsky District

== Moscow Oblast ==
As of 2010, three rural localities in Moscow Oblast bear this name:

- Znamenskoye, Kashirsky District, Moscow Oblast, a village in Znamenskoye Rural Settlement of Kashirsky District
- Znamenskoye, Odintsovsky District, Moscow Oblast, a selo in Gorskoye Rural Settlement of Odintsovsky District
- Znamenskaya, Moscow Oblast, a village in Savvinskoye Rural Settlement of Yegoryevsky District

== Nizhny Novgorod Oblast ==
As of 2010, three rural localities in Nizhny Novgorod Oblast bear this name:

- Znamensky, Nizhny Novgorod Oblast, a settlement in Svetlogorsky Selsoviet of Shatkovsky District
- Znamenskoye, Pilninsky District, Nizhny Novgorod Oblast, a selo in Medyansky Selsoviet of Pilninsky District
- Znamenskoye, Voskresensky District, Nizhny Novgorod Oblast, a selo in Blagoveshchensky Selsoviet of Voskresensky District

== Novgorod Oblast ==
As of 2010, one rural locality in Novgorod Oblast bears this name:

- Znamenskoye, Novgorod Oblast, a village in Bykovskoye Settlement of Pestovsky District

== Omsk Oblast ==
As of 2010, one rural locality in Omsk Oblast bears this name:

- Znamenskoye, Omsk Oblast, a selo in Znamensky Rural Okrug of Znamensky District

== Oryol Oblast ==
As of 2010, seven rural localities in Oryol Oblast bear this name:

- Znamenskoye, Bolkhovsky District, Oryol Oblast, a village in Novosinetsky Selsoviet of Bolkhovsky District
- Znamenskoye, Dolzhansky District, Oryol Oblast, a selo in Kozma-Demyanovsky Selsoviet of Dolzhansky District
- Znamenskoye, Kolpnyansky District, Oryol Oblast, a selo in Znamensky Selsoviet of Kolpnyansky District
- Znamenskoye, Mtsensky District, Oryol Oblast, a selo in Vysokinsky Selsoviet of Mtsensky District
- Znamenskoye, Orlovsky District, Oryol Oblast, a selo in Bolshekulikovsky Selsoviet of Orlovsky District
- Znamenskoye, Sverdlovsky District, Oryol Oblast, a selo in Nikolsky Selsoviet of Sverdlovsky District
- Znamenskoye, Znamensky District, Oryol Oblast, a selo in Znamensky Selsoviet of Znamensky District

== Penza Oblast ==
As of 2010, two rural localities in Penza Oblast bear this name:

- Znamenskoye, Bashmakovsky District, Penza Oblast, a selo in Znamensky Selsoviet of Bashmakovsky District
- Znamenskoye, Mokshansky District, Penza Oblast, a selo in Plessky Selsoviet of Mokshansky District

== Saratov Oblast ==
As of 2010, one rural locality in Saratov Oblast bears this name:

- Znamensky, Saratov Oblast, a settlement in Ivanteyevsky District

== Sverdlovsk Oblast ==
As of 2010, two rural localities in Sverdlovsk Oblast bear this name:

- Znamenskoye, Irbitsky District, Sverdlovsk Oblast, a selo in Irbitsky District
- Znamenskoye, Sukholozhsky District, Sverdlovsk Oblast, a selo in Sukholozhsky District

== Tula Oblast ==
As of 2010, four rural localities in Tula Oblast bear this name:

- Znamensky, Tula Oblast, a settlement in Shirinsky Rural Okrug of Novomoskovsky District
- Znamenskoye, Kurkinsky District, Tula Oblast, a selo in Mikhaylovskaya Volost of Kurkinsky District
- Znamenskoye, Suvorovsky District, Tula Oblast, a selo in Balevskaya Rural Territory of Suvorovsky District
- Znamenskoye, Yasnogorsky District, Tula Oblast, a selo in Znamenskaya Rural Territory of Yasnogorsky District

== Tver Oblast ==
As of 2010, four rural localities in Tver Oblast bear this name:

- Znamenskoye, Oleninsky District, Tver Oblast, a selo in Oleninsky District
- Znamenskoye, Rzhevsky District, Tver Oblast, a village in Rzhevsky District
- Znamenskoye, Staritsky District, Tver Oblast, a village in Staritsky District
- Znamenskoye, Toropetsky District, Tver Oblast, a village in Toropetsky District

== Vladimir Oblast ==
As of 2010, one rural locality in Vladimir Oblast bears this name:

- Znamenskoye, Vladimir Oblast, a village in Kirzhachsky District

== Vologda Oblast ==
As of 2010, one rural locality in Vologda Oblast bears this name:

- Znamenskoye, Vologda Oblast, a settlement in Sukhonsky Selsoviet of Mezhdurechensky District

== Yaroslavl Oblast ==
As of 2010, one rural locality in Yaroslavl Oblast bears this name:

- Znamenskoye, Yaroslavl Oblast, a village in Klimatinsky Rural Okrug of Uglichsky District
