= Michałów, Ostrowiec County =

Michałów
- Village
- Location within Poland
- Coordinates: 51°2′16″N 21°35′50″E
- Country: Poland
- Voivodeship: Świętokrzyskie
- County: Ostrowiec
- Gmina: Bałtów
- Population: 120

Michałów [miˈxawuf] is a village in the administrative district of Gmina Bałtów, within Ostrowiec County, Świętokrzyskie Voivodeship, in south-central Poland. It lies approximately 5 km (3 mi) north-east of Bałtów, 19 km (12 mi) north-east of Ostrowiec Świętokrzyski, and 71 km (44 mi) east of the regional capital Kielce.
