= Antoniów =

Antoniów may refer to the following places in Poland:

- Antoniów, Lower Silesian Voivodeship (south-west Poland)
- Antoniów, Gmina Opoczno in Łódź Voivodeship (central Poland)
- Antoniów, Gmina Żarnów in Łódź Voivodeship (central Poland)
- Antoniów, Radomsko County in Łódź Voivodeship (central Poland)
- Antoniów, Lublin Voivodeship (east Poland)
- Antoniów, Świętokrzyskie Voivodeship (south-central Poland)
- Antoniów, Subcarpathian Voivodeship (south-east Poland)
- Antoniów, Lipsko County in Masovian Voivodeship (east-central Poland)
- Antoniów, Przysucha County in Masovian Voivodeship (east-central Poland)
- Antoniów, Radom County in Masovian Voivodeship (east-central Poland)
- Antoniów, Szydłowiec County in Masovian Voivodeship (east-central Poland)
- Antoniów, Silesian Voivodeship (south Poland)
- Antoniów, Opole Voivodeship (south-west Poland)
