= Maksymilianów =

Maksymilianów may refer to the following places:

- Maksymilianów, Poddębice County in Łódź Voivodeship (central Poland)
- Maksymilianów, Gmina Rokiciny, Tomaszów County in Łódź Voivodeship (central Poland)
- Maksymilianów, Świętokrzyskie Voivodeship (south-central Poland)
- Maksymilianów, Radom County in Masovian Voivodeship (east-central Poland)
- Maksymilianów, Węgrów County in Masovian Voivodeship (east-central Poland)
- Maksymilianów, Greater Poland Voivodeship (west-central Poland)
