= Wycinka =

- Village
- Location within Poland
- Coordinates: 50°59′22″N 21°34′33″E
- Country: Poland
- Voivodeship: Świętokrzyskie
- County: Ostrowiec
- Gmina: Bałtów
- Population: 80

Wycinka [vɨˈt͡ɕiŋka] is a village in the administrative district of Gmina Bałtów, within Ostrowiec County, Świętokrzyskie Voivodeship, in south-central Poland. It lies approximately 4 km (2 mi) south-east of Bałtów, 14 km (9 mi) north-east of Ostrowiec Świętokrzyski, and 69 km (43 mi) east of the regional capital Kielce.
