= Lemierze =

- Village
- Location within Poland
- Coordinates: 50°59′4″N 21°33′43″E
- Country: Poland
- Voivodeship: Świętokrzyskie
- County: Ostrowiec
- Gmina: Bałtów
- Population: 190

Lemierze [lɛˈmjɛʐɛ] is a village in the administrative district of Gmina Bałtów, within Ostrowiec County, Świętokrzyskie Voivodeship, in south-central Poland. It lies approximately 4 km (2 mi) south of Bałtów, 13 km (8 mi) north-east of Ostrowiec Świętokrzyski, and 68 km (42 mi) east of the regional capital Kielce.
