= Wólka Trzemecka =

- Village
- Location within Poland
- Coordinates: 51°2′32″N 21°31′9″E
- Country: Poland
- Voivodeship: Świętokrzyskie
- County: Ostrowiec
- Gmina: Bałtów
- Population: 90

Wólka Trzemecka [ˈvulka tʂɛˈmɛt͡ska] is a village in the administrative district of Gmina Bałtów, within Ostrowiec County, Świętokrzyskie Voivodeship, in south-central Poland. It lies approximately 4 km (2 mi) north-west of Bałtów, 15 km (9 mi) north-east of Ostrowiec Świętokrzyski, and 66 km (41 mi) east of the regional capital Kielce.
