= Borcuchy =

- Village
- Location within Poland
- Coordinates: 51°2′1″N 21°29′59″E
- Country: Poland
- Voivodeship: Świętokrzyskie
- County: Ostrowiec
- Gmina: Bałtów
- Population: 70

Borcuchy [bɔrˈt͡suxɨ] is a village in the administrative district of Gmina Bałtów, within Ostrowiec County, Świętokrzyskie Voivodeship, in south-central Poland. It lies approximately 4 km (2 mi) north-west of Bałtów, 14 km (9 mi) north-east of Ostrowiec Świętokrzyski, and 65 km (40 mi) east of the regional capital Kielce.
