= Rudka Bałtowska =

Village in Ostrowiec County, Poland

- Village
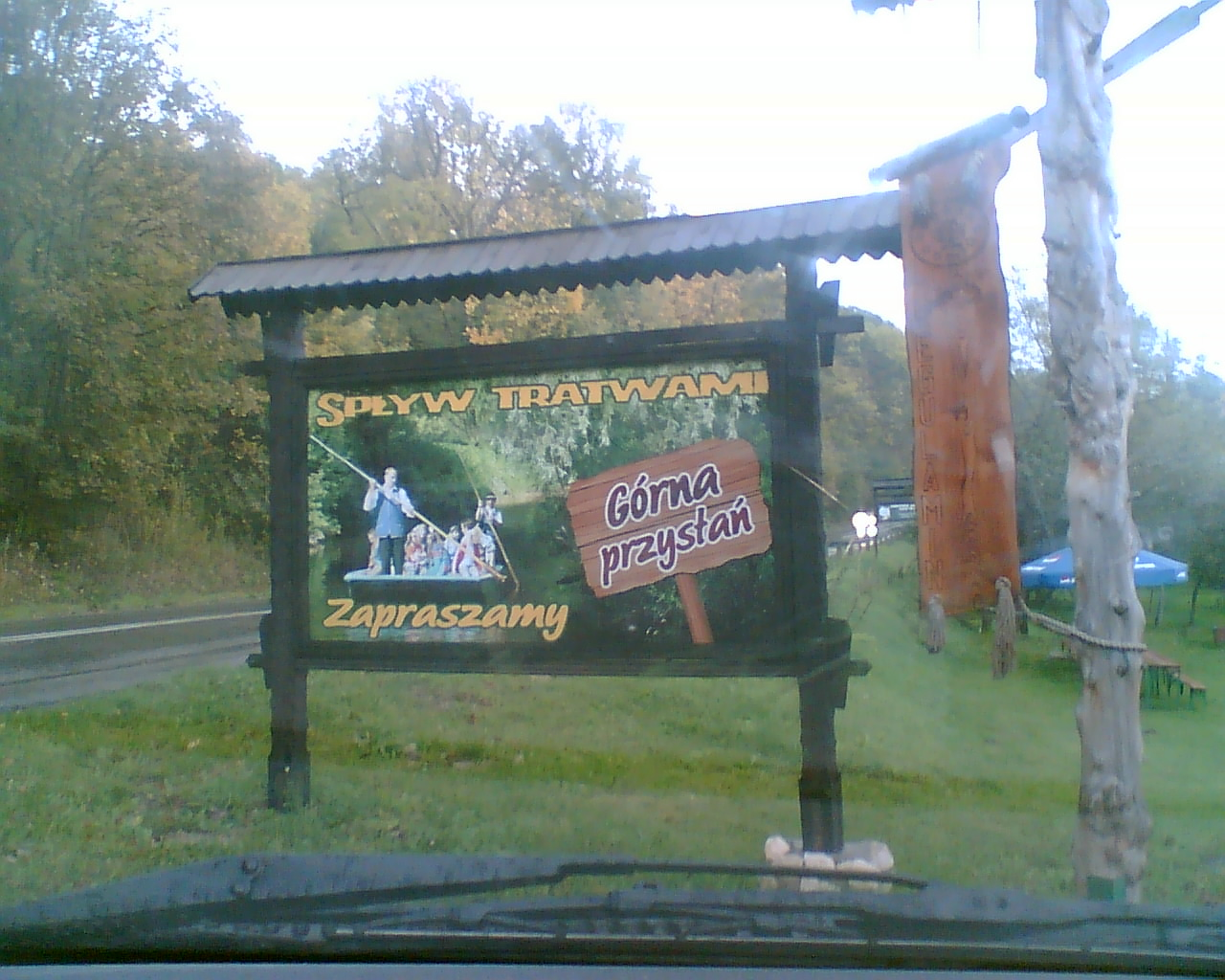

- Location within Poland
- Coordinates: 51°0′11″N 21°31′13″E
- Country: Poland
- Voivodeship: Świętokrzyskie
- County: Ostrowiec
- Gmina: Bałtów
- Population: 180

Rudka Bałtowska [ˈrutka bau̯ˈtɔfska] is a village in the administrative district of Gmina Bałtów, within Ostrowiec County, Świętokrzyskie Voivodeship, in south-central Poland. It lies approximately 3 km (2 mi) south-west of Bałtów, 12 km (7 mi) north-east of Ostrowiec Świętokrzyski, and 65 km (40 mi) east of the regional capital Kielce.
