= Lesser Poland Province, Crown of the Kingdom of Poland =

Polish subdivision

Lesser Poland Province Polish: Prowincja małopolska
- Province of Poland
- 1569–1795
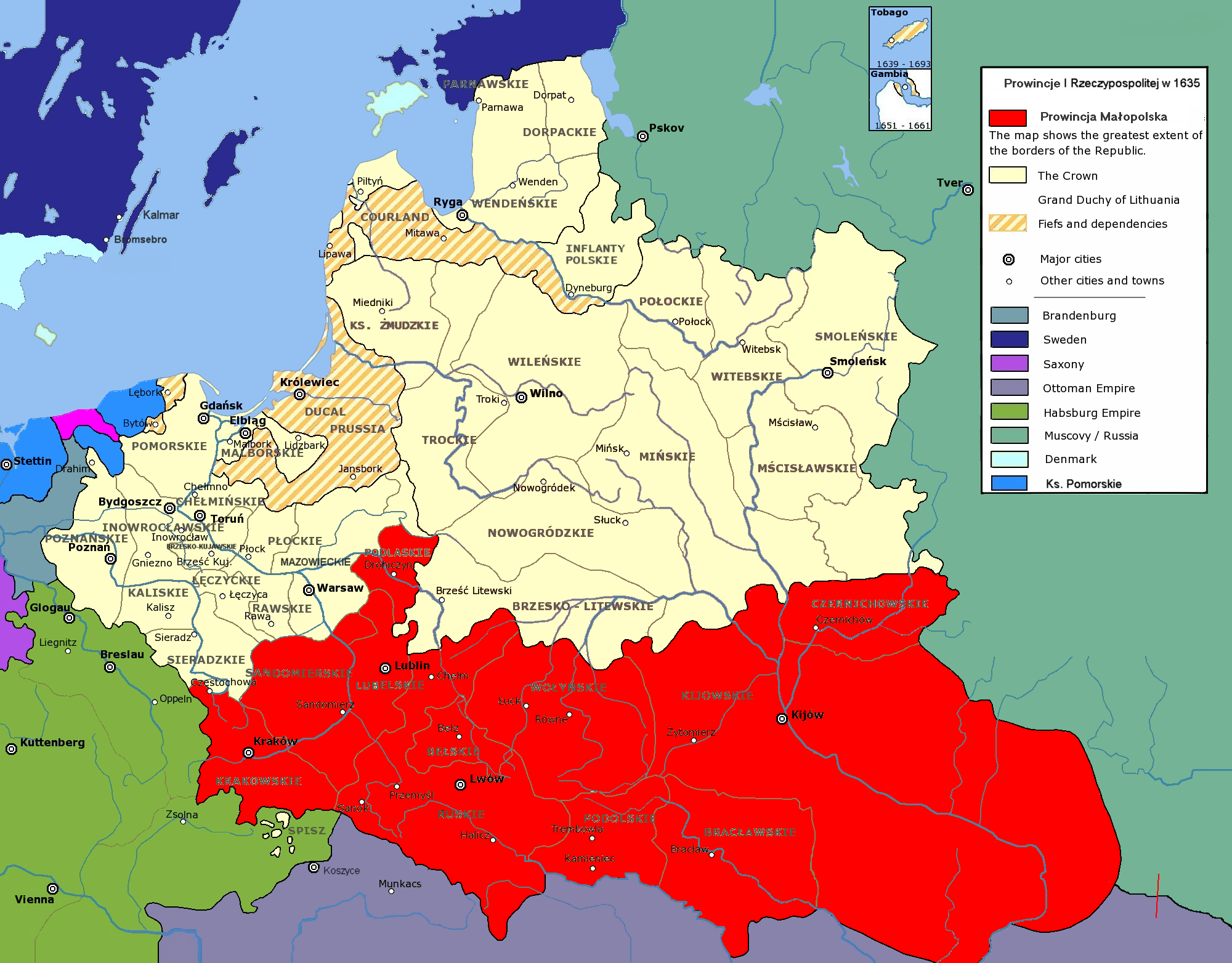
- Lesser Poland Province, 1635 (in red)
- Capital: Kraków
- Political subdivisions: 11 voivodeships and one duchy
- Today part of: Poland; Ukraine; Belarus; Republic of Moldova; Slovakia

Lesser Poland Province (Polish: Prowincja małopolska, Latin: Polonia Minor) was an administrative division of the Crown of the Kingdom of Poland from 1569 until 1795. It was the largest province of the Polish–Lithuanian Commonwealth, with Kraków as its capital. The province's name derives from the historic region of Lesser Poland, indicating its lesser seniority rather than its size.

It had two administrative seats, one in Sądowa Wisznia for Ruthenian lands, and another in Nowe Miasto Korczyn for Polish lands. The province consisted of 11 voivodeships and one duchy (see below).

Polish historian Henryk Wisner in his 2002 book Rzeczpospolita Wazów. Czasy Zygmunta III i Władysława IV writes that it is not known when lands of the Polish Crown were divided into the two provinces:

Parallel to the Crown of the Kingdom of Poland, and the Grand Duchy of Lithuania, provinces existed, which should be called Sejm provinces, as they became visible during its sessions; mostly during election of the Marshal of the Sejm, and the royal election. These were Provinces of Lithuania, Greater Poland, and Lesser Poland. First one covered the Grand Duchy of Lithuania, the remaining two were artificially made, and it is not known who and in what way created them. We know that the Sejm was not involved in creation of these provinces.

Zygmunt Gloger in his book Historical Geography of the Lands of Old Poland (1900) provides this description of the Province of Lesser Poland:

Lesser Poland proper was made of three voivodeships: those of Krakow, Sandomierz, and Lublin, plus the Duchy of Siewierz, purchased in the 15th century by Bishop of Krakow Zbigniew Olesnicki. Furthermore, to Lesser Poland belonged thirteen towns of Spiš, located behind the Carpathians. Altogether, Lesser Poland had the area of 21,046 sq. miles, which was 6 sq. miles less than Greater Poland. In the mid-16th century, the three voivodeships of Lesser Poland (without Siewierz and Spis) had 922 Roman-Catholic parishes, 205 towns and 5,500 villages.

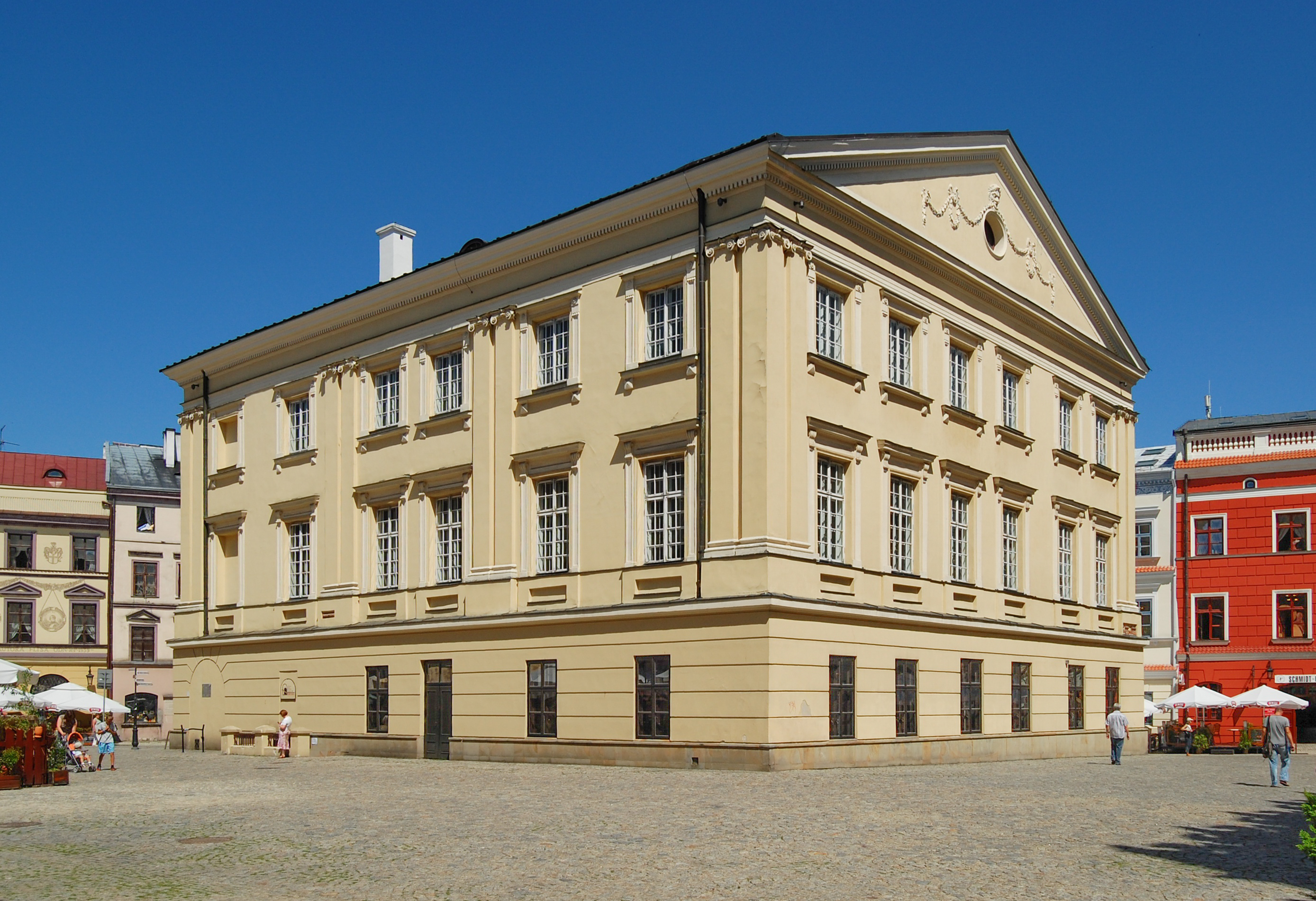
The Crown Tribunal in Lublin, the highest appeal court in the province of Lesser Poland

The locations of the Crown Tribunal for the Lesser Poland Province were initially Lublin and Łuck (Lutsk), after 1590 only Lublin, after the Convocation Sejm (1764) also Lwów (Lviv), and again after 1768 only Lublin.

The four most influential royal cities, i.e. Kraków, Lwów, Lublin and Kamieniec Podolski, enjoyed voting rights during the Royal elections alongside the nobility.

== Lesser Poland Province ==
Following the 1569 Union of Lublin, the lands of Red Ruthenia, Volhynia, Podolia and Ukraine were added to Royal domain (the Crown), joining the Province of Lesser Poland. As a result, Lesser Poland consisted of eleven voivodeships, three duchies and three lands.

1. Bełz Voivodeship (województwo bełzkie, Bełz [today Belz, Ukraine])
2. Bracław Voivodeship (województwo bracławskie, Bracław [Bratslav])
3. Czernihów Voivodeship (województwo czernichowskie, Czernihów [Chernihiv])
4. Kijów Voivodeship (województwo kijowskie, Kijów [Kyiv])
5. Kraków Voivodeship (województwo krakowskie, Kraków), together with the duchies of Oświęcim, Siewierz, Zator, and the Eldership of Spisz.
6. Lublin Voivodeship (województwo lubelskie, Lublin), together with the Łuków Land,
7. Podlaskie Voivodeship (województwo podlaskie, Drohiczyn)
8. Podole Voivodeship (województwo podolskie, Kamieniec Podolski [Kamianets-Podilskyi])
9. Ruś Voivodeship (województwo ruskie, Lwów [Lviv]), together with Chełm Land and Halicz Land (Halych),
10. Sandomierz Voivodeship (województwo sandomierskie, Sandomierz)
11. Wołyń Voivodeship (województwo wołyńskie, Łuck [Lutsk])
