= Maksymilianów, Świętokrzyskie Voivodeship =

Maksymilianów
- Village
- Location within Poland
- Coordinates: 50°59′21″N 21°30′33″E
- Country: Poland
- Voivodeship: Świętokrzyskie
- County: Ostrowiec
- Gmina: Bałtów
- Population: 230

Maksymilianów [maksɨmiˈljanuf] is a village in the administrative district of Gmina Bałtów, within Ostrowiec County, Świętokrzyskie Voivodeship, in south-central Poland. It lies approximately 5 km (3 mi) south-west of Bałtów, 10 km (6 mi) north-east of Ostrowiec Świętokrzyski, and 64 km (40 mi) east of the regional capital Kielce.
