= Okół, Świętokrzyskie Voivodeship =

Okół
- Village
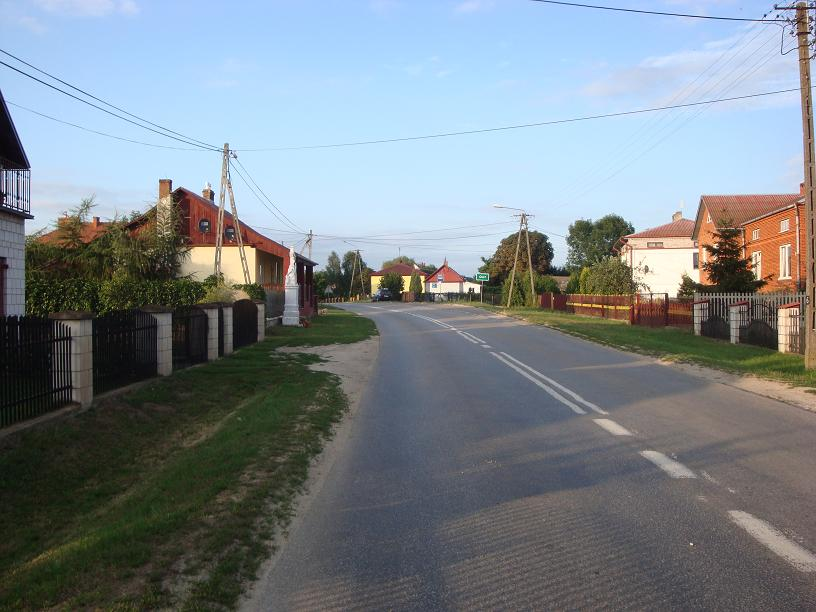

- Location within Poland
- Coordinates: 51°1′37″N 21°37′55″E
- Country: Poland
- Voivodeship: Świętokrzyskie
- County: Ostrowiec
- Gmina: Bałtów
- Population: 930

Okół [ˈɔkuu̯] is a village in the administrative district of Gmina Bałtów, within Ostrowiec County, Świętokrzyskie Voivodeship, in south-central Poland. It lies approximately 6 km (4 mi) east of Bałtów, 20 km (12 mi) north-east of Ostrowiec Świętokrzyski, and 73 km (45 mi) east of the regional capital Kielce.
