= Wólka Pętkowska =

- Village
- Location within Poland
- Coordinates: 51°0′7″N 21°36′59″E
- Country: Poland
- Voivodeship: Świętokrzyskie
- County: Ostrowiec
- Gmina: Bałtów
- Population: 150

Wólka Pętkowska [ˈvulka pɛntˈkɔfska] is a village in the administrative district of Gmina Bałtów, within Ostrowiec County, Świętokrzyskie Voivodeship, in south-central Poland. It lies approximately 5 km (3 mi) east of Bałtów, 17 km (11 mi) north-east of Ostrowiec Świętokrzyski, and 72 km (45 mi) east of the regional capital Kielce.
