= Antoniów, Świętokrzyskie Voivodeship =

Antoniów
- Village
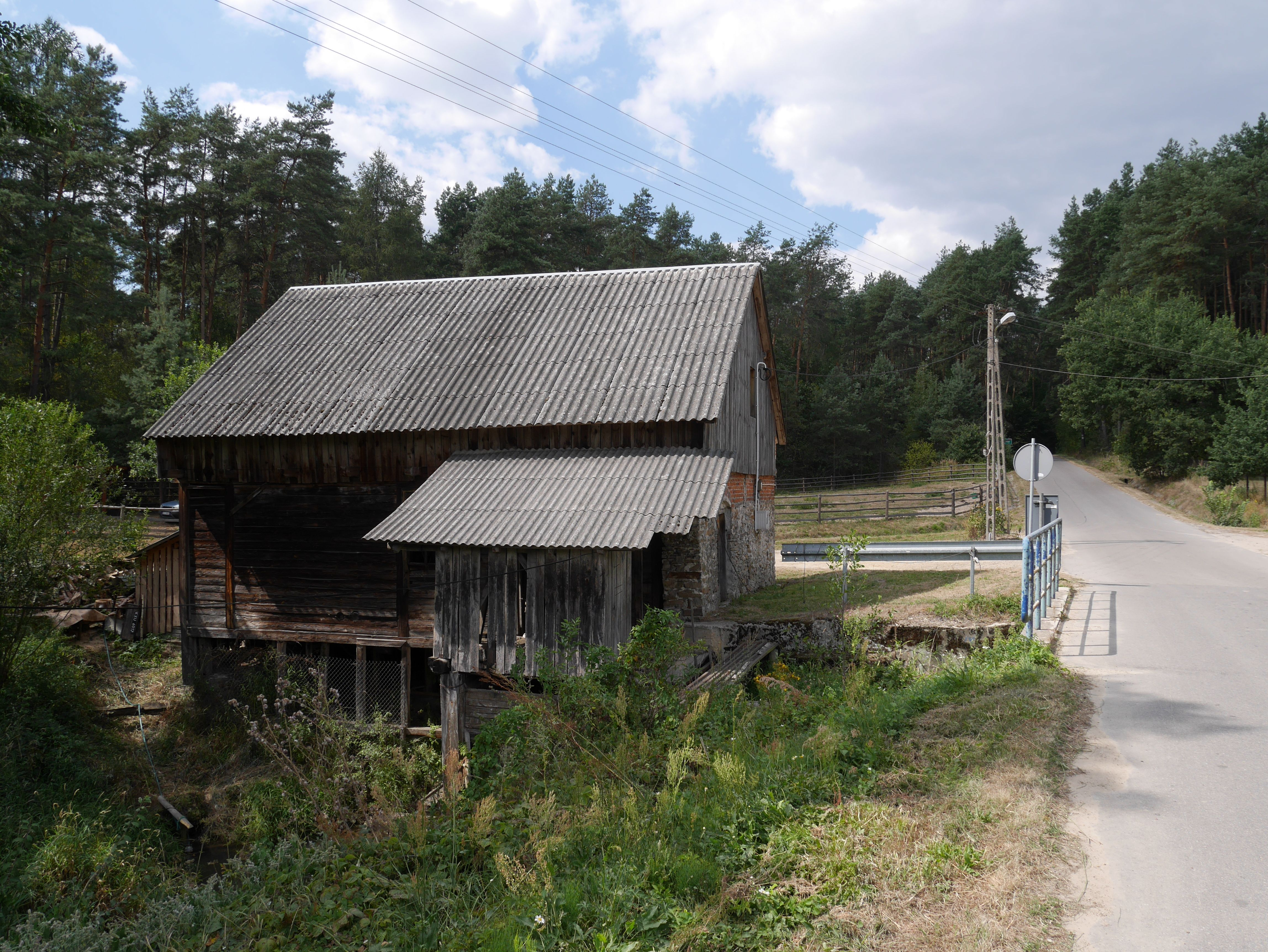

- Location within Poland
- Coordinates: 51°3′8″N 21°31′48″E
- Country: Poland
- Voivodeship: Świętokrzyskie
- County: Ostrowiec
- Gmina: Bałtów
- Population: 130

Antoniów [anˈtɔɲuf] is a village in the administrative district of Gmina Bałtów within Ostrowiec County, Świętokrzyskie Voivodeship in south-central Poland. It lies approximately 5 km (3 mi) north of Bałtów, 17 km (11 mi) north-east of Ostrowiec Świętokrzyski, and 67 km (42 mi) east of the regional capital Kielce.
