= Alexander Znamensky =

Russian athlete and professional wrestler

Alexander Vladimirovich Znamensky
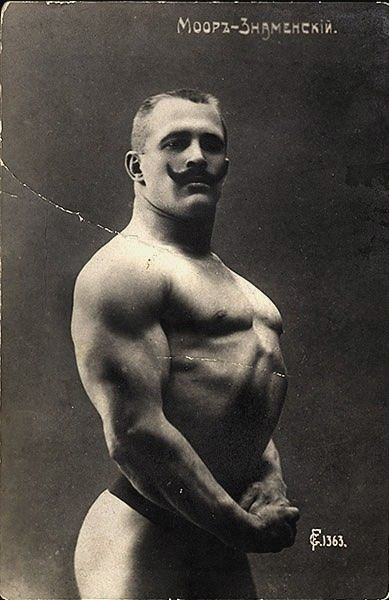

Personal information
- Born: Alexander Vladimirovich Znamensky; 1877 Moscow, Russian Empire
- Died: 1928 (aged 50–51) Saint Petersburg, Russian SFSR, Soviet Union

Professional wrestling career
- Ring name(s): Moor-Znamensky, Moor
- Billed height: 170
- Billed weight: 88
- Trained by: Vladislav Frantsevich Kraevsky

Alexander Vladimirovich Znamensky (also known as Williams Moor-Znamensky; 1877, Moscow, Russian Empire – 1928, St. Petersburg, Russia) was a professional circus athlete, weight lifter, belt wrestler.

== Biography ==
=== Early life ===
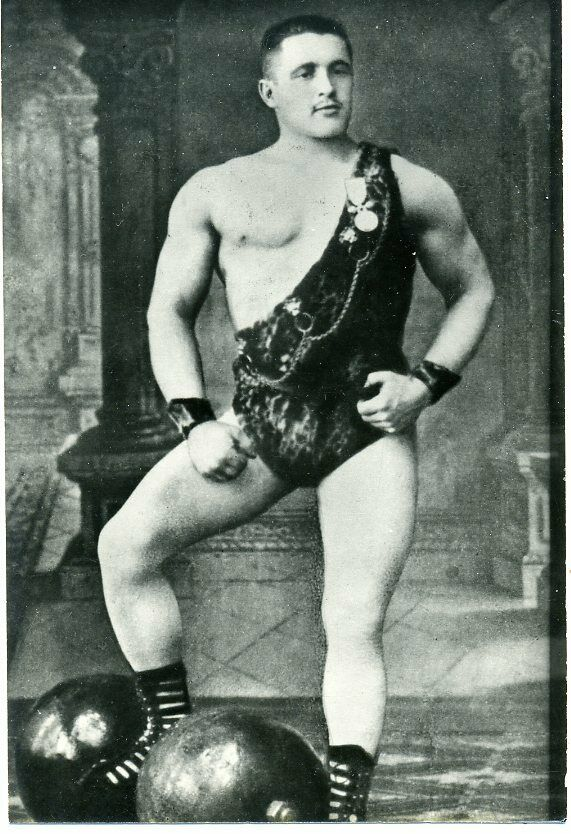
Picture on postcard: Williams Moore-Znamensky with a “bulldog” for a forceful performance in a circus show.

In 1894, the family moved to St. Petersburg, where, at the age of 17, Alexander became involved in physical exercises, first independently, then began to work in the circle of Dr. V. F. Krayevsky and under his leadership.

=== Circus career and beginning as a strongman ===
In 1895, came to work in the Izmailovo Garden – Park of St. Petersburg, where visiting circus artists broke up their cloth tents. Alexander worked in a circus in the arena, which he himself kept and where he organized his shows: entering the arena with numbers to raise or hold heavy objects. In the circus, he performed such tricks as: a flip and a double-weights wheel, one in each hand, carrying a piano circus arena with a taper (musician) on the back, holding a platform with an orchestra on his chest, pressed two two-poop weights with his right hand, carried a live horse on his shoulders and others. Here, Moor-Znamensky also competed in the “belt-wrestling”, shifted all the fighters, except for the butcher, from the Ligovsky market of Trusov, Which only V. A. Pytlyasinsky could beat. Then in the Ciniselli Circus there were strongmen: the Estonian Besberg, the Warsaw Vasilevsky, the Austrian Paller, Robyn, Pytlyasinsky, Emil Foss (Stetten, Germany), the Bulgarian Nikola Petrov and Williams Moor-Znamensky.

=== Early weightlifting ===
In 1895, on September 8, he broke the record of athlete-artist N. I. Kravchenko in an exercise with hands, lifting a weight of 330 pounds (135 kg) against 310 (127 kg).

In 1896, in St. Petersburg, a strongman, a wrestler and a major horse breeder, Count G. I. Ribopier, headed the voluntary athletic society, bringing together many like-minded people in one place. In the same year he put Pytlyasinsky himself on the shoulder blades.

In 1897, on February 20, at the age of 20, he set a world record, surpassing Hans Beck in a push of a bar with both hands at the same time 386 pounds (158 kg).

=== Wrestling ===
In 1898 the circus of the Truzzi brothers arrived in Voronezh. There were only a few people in Russia and everyone was looked upon as a “miracle”, mostly “overseas”, therefore the first athlete in Voronezh, Alexander, speaking under the pseudonym Williams Moor-Znamensky, was considered a “Greek demigod descended from Olympus”. Since all the strongmen were mainly from abroad, then for greater significance and advertising, fashion appeared among local strongmen to perform under foreign pseudonyms to attract attention and Alexander chose to nickname William Moore-Znamensky. The first to dare to oppose the “demigod” was a simple peasant from the Voronezh Governorate of Zemlyansky district — Ryabov P. I. (1858–10) nicknamed Pronya Martynovsky or just Pronya.

The Directorate of the Circus of the Italian Brothers Truzzi organized a fight between Pronia and Moor-Znamensky athletes. Pronya and Moor-Znamensky finished in a draw and Truzzi discharged the Italian wrestler Saint Pappi to Voronezh, with whom there was also a fight in a draw, and Proni’s performance with Emil Foss ended the same way. At the end of the performances of the strong men, the circus went to the city of Kozlov, where Moor-Znamensky called on all fans to contend with him. Ribopier ordered Pronya from Voronezh to Kozlov, he arrived and firmly laid Moor-Znamensky on his shoulder blades. Soon, Pronya himself became a professional wrestler and himself already called for amateurs to compete with him. At that time, amateurs often competed with professionals and this was an everyday affair, and professionals were not averse to testing the possibilities of newbies, since there was not much to compete with.

In Kozlov, in the arena of a crowded circus, there was a scandal between Pronya and Moor-Znamensky during a performance: Pronya left from the attacks of Moor-Znamensky, not engaging in battle for a long time, and Moor-Znamensky defiantly became sideways to the enemy, raising his hands up and was defeated. After waiting a moment, Pronya grabbed his rival with a belt and threw it onto the shoulder blades, scoring a technical victory, which was discussed in the newspapers for a long time. Moore-Znamensky in a rage for this “victory” hit Pronius, the police soon intervened; the same night, Moor-Znamensky left the city of Kozlov (now Michurinsk, Tambov Oblast) and the scandal soon subsided.

Soon in St. Petersburg, the Trusov butcher became famous, trading in the Ligovsky market during the day, and in the evenings he fought in circuses. Thus, the first generation of Russian professional wrestlers emerged, formed from amateur athletes.

At the end of the XIX century, many Russian athletes showed the results of the world's strongest weightlifters, among whom were Williams Moor-Znamensky and Sergey Morro-Dmitriev (Sergey Dmitriev, 1882-1928).

In 1899, the censorship committee approved for publication the manuscript of the fundamental work “Catechism of Health” of Krajewski, written on the basis of the experience of the successful athletes of Pavel Stupin, Peter Krylov and Moor-Znamensky.

=== Later career ===
In 1901, on March 5 (February 20), he set a new record in the push of two weights with two hands at the same time weighing 155 kg and 154 kg in the presence of members of the St. Petersburg Athletic Society. In the same year, on August 11, international wrestling competitions were held in Riga, by Augustus Neyland, director of the variety theater “Olympia” with the restaurant Schnelles Variete, in which Znamensky was awarded the title of champion of the Baltic provinces. Performed Alex Aberg, Georg Lurich and others. Later, on October 25, wrestling competitions were held in the circus of G. Schwanguradze in the town of Libave (now Liepaja), in which professionals and amateurs took part, where everyone could test their strength in the arena; then the term "semi-professional" appeared. Professionals Moor-Znamensky, Georg Lurikh, Alex Aberg, Paul Abs, Nikola Petrov, Johan Kanep (under the pseudonym Dicky Isand), Pole Franz Benkovsky (under the pseudonym Cyclop), Robine and 11 lovers, including the Latvian Burgmeister, who later became famous Ivan, took part. Romanov, a member of the Sevastopol defense.

Since 1902, Moor-Znamensky became involved in wrestling competitions.

In 1914, in March in the All-Russian sports magazine "Hercules", published in St. Petersburg, an article was published on the development of sports in Voronezh at the beginning of the 20th century. The article is based on the story “Sport in Voronezh (1893 – 1914)” about popular sports in the largest city of the Central Chernozem Region, which athlete-athlete Nikolai Grigorievich Belotelov, one of the first organizers and leaders of football in the Mikhailovsky Voronezh Cadet Corps, passed to the editor.

I. V. Lebedev in his album "The Fighters" described Znamensky so:

Specifically, the Romans laid down the proverb: "This is how worldly glory passes." About 18 years ago he beat world records in kettlebells with chic and was a great belt fighter. He fought in French as ... a professor of mathematics, because, because of myopia, he could see the enemy only through the glasses of the strongest pince-nez. Now they have forgotten him, although he is still slim, strong and muscular. And before ... 0 – th – th! “Moor Moorich” was a household name. In addition to athletic talents, he also has outstanding financial capabilities that were not appreciated enough in Russia, but in America he probably would have founded a banking house. He speaks 5 languages and reads Voltaire in the original, - with the public with great pleasure, rather than without the public.

== Legacy ==
Weightlifting historian A. A. Sukhanov wrote about the Moor-Znamensky, as well as S. Eliseev, in a 1987 edition of the illustrated weekly magazine Cyclist, published in Moscow since 1895: “One of the strongest professionals in the world, Russian Strongman Moore (Znamensky) has 406 pounds (166.26 kg) in the push with both hands... ”. “Moor-Znamensky has two 406 pounds in the push and two 8 pounds 10 pounds (135.13 kg) in the press. One of the first-class weight-lifters, not only in Russia, but also in the world... Korifey of Russian athletic sports "(from the article by Chaplinsky, Russian Sport magazine, 1911)

Alexander Grigorievich Ribopier will later mark Moor-Znamensky as one of the professional Russian wrestlers of the first generation, along with athletes such as: Georg Lurikh, a former Volga hookster Ivan Zaikin, Peter Yankovsky, Zamukov, Stupin, Lukin, Snezhkin, Ivan Poddubny and "King of weights" – Muscovite Peter Krylov.

== Later life and death ==
In 1917, because of a dislocation in the knee joint, Moor-Znamensky left the arena and got a job as an assistant police chief in Moscow.

In 1928, at the age of fifty-eight, he died, retaining his excellent physical form until his death.
