= Georgy Znamensky =

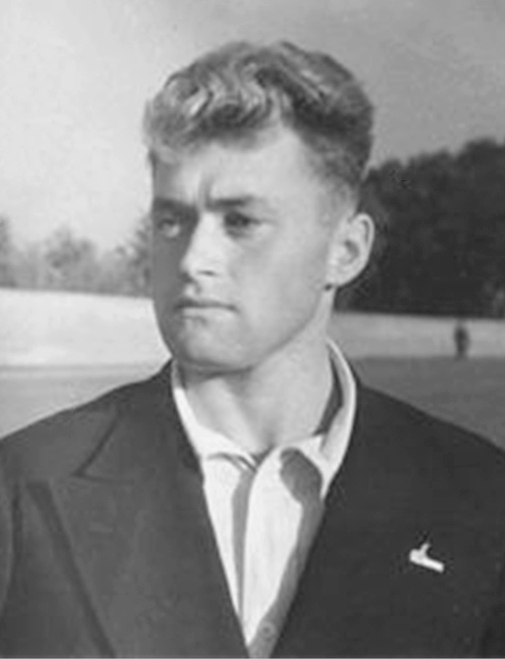

Personal information
- Born: 12 June 1903 Zelyonaya Sloboda, Bronnitsky Uyezd, Moscow Governorate, Russian Empire
- Died: 28 December 1946 (aged 43)

Sport
- Sport: Athletics
- Event: 1000–10,000 m
- Club: Spartak Moscow
- Retired: 1940

Achievements and titles
- Personal bests: 5000 m – 14:41.8 (1938); 10,000 m – 30:45.8 (1939)

Georgy Ivanovich Znamensky (Russian: Геóргий Ивáнович Знáменский, 12 June 1903 – 28 December 1946) was a Russian middle-distance and long-distance runner.

Znamensky was born in a family of a priest and had four sisters and five brothers; one of them, Seraphim, became his long-term training partner and rival in athletics. By the age of 20 Georgy was the fittest man in his locality, yet he later had two health-threatening accidents: once, during the harvest works, a horse stepped on his foot, which required a surgery. Later, while serving with the Black Sea Navy, his boat overturned drowning the crew. Znamensky was the sole survivor.

After retiring from the Navy, in 1931 Georgy found a job at a factory in Moscow. He could not afford a room in the city and lived together with Seraphim at the house of a family friend. In those years the brothers trained by running 16 km between their home and the factory where they worked, while their diet consisted of rye bread, potato, and plenty of milk (a bucket per day for two).

In 1932 the brothers started competing, and shortly established themselves as the best Soviet runners, with Seraphim being the stronger of the two. Contensting various 1000 m – 10,000 m events the brothers finished 18 times within the podium at the Soviet championships in 1934–1940 and set 24 national records. They rarely competed internationally, as the Soviet Union was not a member of the International Association of Athletics Federations (IAAF), yet in 1935, 1937 and 1938 they won the annual 8 km cross-country race established by L'Humanité in France.

In 1936 the brothers enrolled to the Russian National Research Medical University and graduated in 1941. At the onset of World War II in Russia they both volunteered as medical doctors to the Soviet Army. Seraphim killed himself in 1942, while Georgy died of cancer in late 1946. Before that he attended the 1946 European Athletics Championships as a physician of the Soviet team. In 1949, an annual athletics competition was established in honor of the brothers, the Brothers Znamensky Memorial. In 1958 it received the international status and later became a major IAAF meeting. In 1961 an Olympic sports school and the associated athletics complex have been founded in Moscow and named after the brothers.
