= Znamenskoye, Vologda Oblast =

Znamenskoye Знаменское
- Settlement
- Location within Vologda Oblast Location within Russia
- Coordinates: 59°23′N 41°16′E
- Country: Russia
- Region: Vologda Oblast
- District: Mezhdurechensky District
- Time zone: UTC+3:00

Znamenskoye (Russian: Знаменское) is a rural locality (a settlement) in Sukhonskoye Rural Settlement, Mezhdurechensky District, Vologda Oblast, Russia. The population was 2 in 2002.

== Geography ==
Znamenskoye is located 28 kilometres (17 mi) northeast of Shuyskoye (the district's administrative centre) by road. Motyri is the nearest rural locality.
