= Gmina Bałtów =

Gmina Bałtów Bałtów Commune
- Gmina
- Flag Coat of arms
- Interactive map of Gmina Bałtów
- Coordinates (Bałtów): 51°1′N 21°33′E
- Country: Poland
- Voivodeship: Świętokrzyskie
- County: Ostrowiec
- Seat: Bałtów

Area
  - Total: 104.92 km^{2} (40.51 sq mi)

Population (2006)
  - Total: 3,999
  - Density: 38.11/km^{2} (98.72/sq mi)
- Website: http://www.gminabaltow.pl/

Gmina Bałtów is a rural gmina (administrative district) in Ostrowiec County, Świętokrzyskie Voivodeship, in south-central Poland. Its seat is the village of Bałtów, which lies approximately 15 kilometres (9 mi) north-east of Ostrowiec Świętokrzyski and 68 km (42 mi) east of the regional capital Kielce.

The gmina covers an area of 104.92 square kilometres (40.5 sq mi), and as of 2006 its total population is 3,999.

== Villages ==
Gmina Bałtów contains the villages and settlements of Antoniów, Bałtów, Bidzińszczyzna, Borcuchy, Lemierze, Maksymilianów, Michałów, Okół, Pętkowice, Rudka Bałtowska, Skarbka, Ulów, Wólka Bałtowska, Wólka Pętkowska, Wólka Trzemecka and Wycinka.

== Neighbouring gminas ==
Gmina Bałtów is bordered by the gminas of Bodzechów, Ćmielów, Sienno and Tarłów.
