= Seraphim Znamensky =

Russian runner

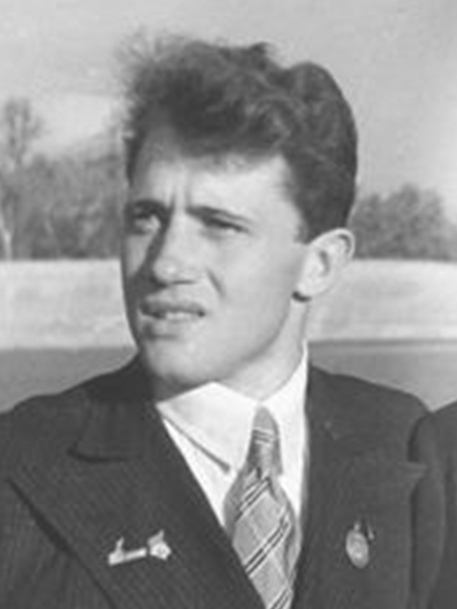

Personal information
- Born: 4 September 1906 Zelyonaya Sloboda, Bronnitsky Uyezd, Moscow Governorate, Russian Empire
- Died: 7 May 1942 (aged 35) Moscow, Russia

Sport
- Sport: Athletics
- Event: 1000–10,000 m
- Club: Spartak Moscow
- Retired: 1940

Achievements and titles
- Personal bests: 5000 m – 14:37.0 (1940); 10,000 m – 30:44.8 (1939)

Seraphim Ivanovich Znamensky (Russian: Серафи́м Ивáнович Знáменский; 4 September 1906 – 7 May 1942) was a Russian middle-distance and long-distance runner.

== Background ==
Znamensky was born into a family of a priest and had four sisters and five brothers; one of them, Georgy, became his long-term training partner and rival in athletics. Seraphim was trained as a musician by his mother; he was an accomplished singer and could read and write sheet music.

In 1931 Seraphim moved to live with his brother Georgy, who had found a job at a factory in Moscow and lived at the house of a family friend. In those years the brothers trained by running 16 km between their home and the factory where they worked, while their diet consisted of rye bread, potato, and plenty of milk (a bucket per day for two).

== Career ==
In 1932 the brothers started competing, and shortly established themselves as the best Soviet runners, with Seraphim being the stronger of the two. Competing in various 1000 m – 10,000 m events, the brothers finished 18 times within the podium at the Soviet championships in 1934–1940 and set 24 national records. They rarely competed internationally, as the Soviet Union was not a member of the International Association of Athletics Federations (IAAF), yet in 1935, 1937 and 1938 they won the annual 8 km cross-country race established by L'Humanité in France. In 1937, Seraphim Znamensky won the 5,000 meters race in the Workers' Summer Olympiad in Antwerp.

In 1936 the brothers enrolled to the Russian National Research Medical University and graduated in 1941. At the onset of World War II in Russia they both volunteered as medical doctors to the Soviet Army.

== Death ==
Seraphim killed himself in 1942 after learning about the death of his mother, while Georgy died of cancer in 1946.

== Honors ==
In 1949, an annual athletics competition was established in honor of the brothers, the Brothers Znamensky Memorial. In 1958 it received international status and later became a major IAAF meeting. In 1961 an Olympic sports school and the associated athletics complex were founded in Moscow and named after the brothers. A sculpture of Seraphim by Sarra Lebedeva is exhibited at the Russian Museum.
