= Znamensky District =

Znamensky District may refer to:

- Znamensky District, Russia, name of several districts in Russia
- Znamianka Raion, a former district of Kirovohrad Oblast, Ukraine
