= Taganrog Circus =

- Таганрогский цирк (Russian)
- Location within Russia
- Location: Taganrog, Rostov oblast Russia

History
- Built: 1881

Site notes
- Owner: brothers Truzzi

Taganrog Circus (Russian: Таганрогский цирк) is a building that appeared in Taganrog in the early 1880s to demonstrate circus art. It was built by circus artists – the brothers Truzzi.

== History ==
The Truzzi family was engaged in a circus art in Moscow, but their activities ceased to be promising and profitable after the declaration of mourning after the death of Emperor Alexander II. The head of the family Maximilian Truzzi decided that the family would now tour in the southern provinces, and he was right. In Rostov-on-Don their troupe was waiting for success. Maximilian had two sons – Rudolph and Zhizhetto, who moved to the city of Taganrog to organize a circus business. In 1881 they built an urban wooden stationary circus, in which they began to organize performances. After the death of Maximilian Truzzi, his children decided to organize their independent circus. Their mother Louise, wife of Maximilian, also lived in Taganrog.

In September 1898 in Taganrog performed circus artist A. L. Durov and in 1909 was the tour of the Moscow circus of Zh. A. Truzzi.

In the 1950s, the premises of the wooden circus became unusable. At this time, the work of circus-tent No. 9 began under the leadership of M.A Belikov. The city administration decided to build a summer semi-stationary circus. In May 1967 M.S Levin became the director.

From 1967 to 1988 the circus performances were held in April, May, October and November. In June 1996, Teresa Vasilyevna Durova performed here. In 1990, the Soyuz governmental circus had plans for the reconstruction of the circus, then it was rebuilt from the mobile in a summer stationary. After the reconstruction in 1993, the circus began to work from May to August.
