= Henryk Wisner =

Polish historian

Henryk Wisner (born 25 August 1936 in Warsaw) is a Polish historian and academic.

In 1962 he graduated from the University of Warsaw with a degree in history. In the following years, he was affiliated with the Department of History at the University of Warsaw, where he received his doctoral degree on June 13, 1967, and his postdoctoral degree on January 11, 1972. On March 28, 1987, he was awarded the title of professor. And on December 1, 1994, the title of full professor.

For many years he has been an employee of the Institute of History of the Polish Academy of Sciences, and a member of the Lituanist Committee. He specializes in modern Polish history, and is an expert on the history of the Polish-Lithuanian Commonwealth during the reign of the Vasa dynasty (especially Lithuania in the period 1587–1648).
