= Znamensk =

Znamensk (Russian: Знаменск) is the name of several inhabited localities in Russia.

Urban localities

- Znamensk, Astrakhan Oblast, a closed town in Astrakhan Oblast

Rural localities

- Znamensk, Kaliningrad Oblast, a settlement in Znamensky Rural Okrug of Gvardeysky District of Kaliningrad Oblast
