= Bałtów, Świętokrzyskie Voivodeship =

Bałtów
- Village
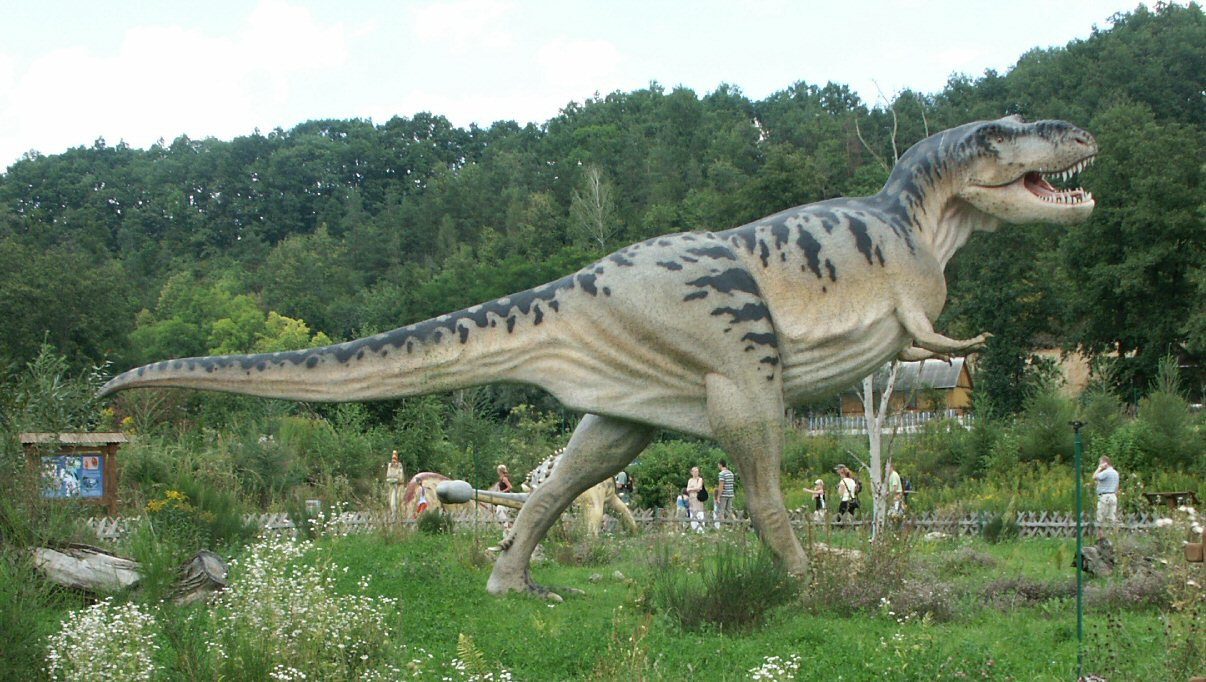
- Tyrranosaurus model in Bałtów Jurassic Park

- Coat of arms

- Location within Poland
- Coordinates: 51°1′N 21°33′E
- Country: Poland
- Voivodeship: Świętokrzyskie
- County: Ostrowiec
- Gmina: Bałtów
- Population: 740
- Time zone: UTC+1 (CET)
  - Summer (DST): UTC+2 (CEST)
- Postal code: 27-423
- Area code: +48 41

Bałtów [ˈbau̯tuf] is a village in Ostrowiec County, Świętokrzyskie Voivodeship, in southeastern Poland. It is the seat of the gmina (administrative district) called Gmina Bałtów. It lies approximately 15 km (9 mi) northeast of Ostrowiec Świętokrzyski and 68 km (42 mi) east of the regional capital Kielce.

== History ==
The village dates back to the Middle Ages and the rule of the Piast dynasty in Poland. Bałtów's first church, dedicated to Saint Andrew, probably existed in the 11th century. The 15th-century Polish chronicler Jan Długosz mentioned the Bałtów in his chronicles. In the early modern period Bałtów was a private village located in the Sandomierz Voivodeship in the Lesser Poland Province of the Kingdom of Poland. The village often changed owners, including politicians Jacek Małachowski and Franciszek Ksawery Drucki-Lubecki. For a short period it was a town, getting town rights before 1751 and losing them before 1790. Bałtów ceased to be a private village in 1864.

During World War II, Bałtów was under German occupation from September 1939 until it was captured by the Soviet Red Army in January 1945 and restored to Poland.

== Places of interest ==
- Large dinopark (called JuraPark)
- Drucki-Lubecki Palace from the 19th century
- Church of Our Lady of Sorrows dated to 1697
- Watermill from the 19th century
- A 19th-century cemetery with the chapel of the Drucki-Lubecki family
- Wooden chapel of St. John of Nepomuk
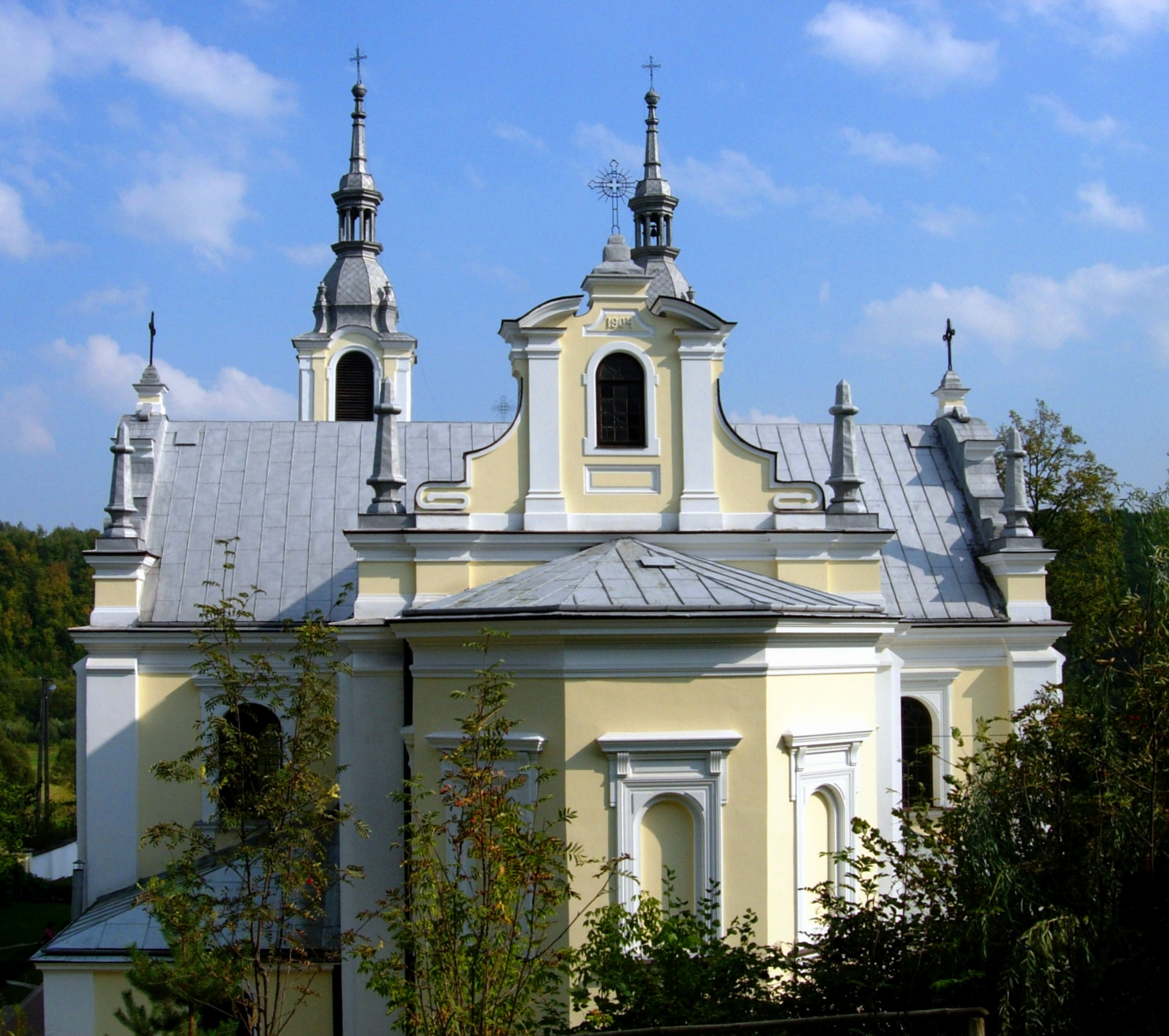
Church of Our Lady of Sorrows

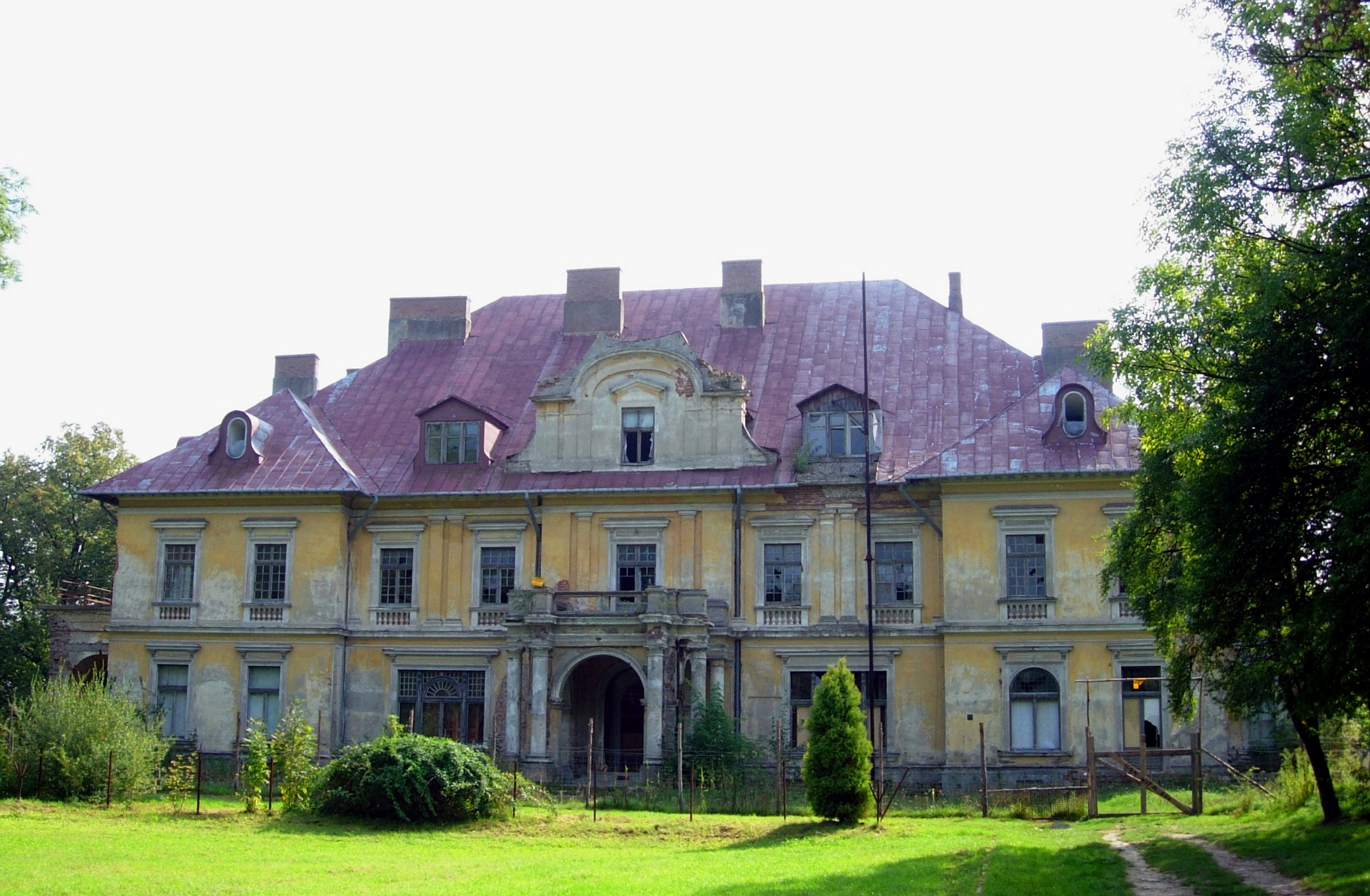
Drucki-Lubecki Palace

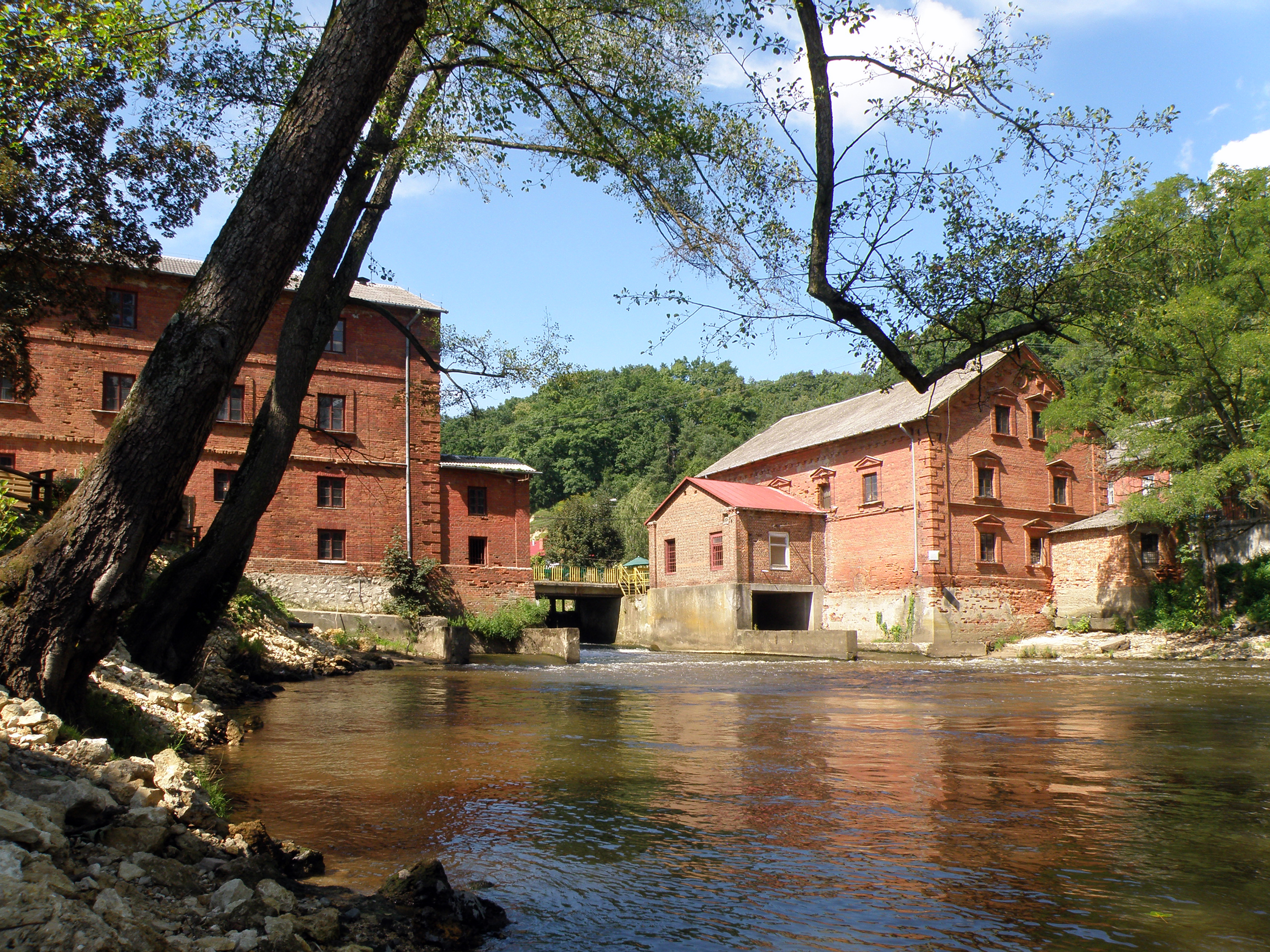
Watermill from the 19th century

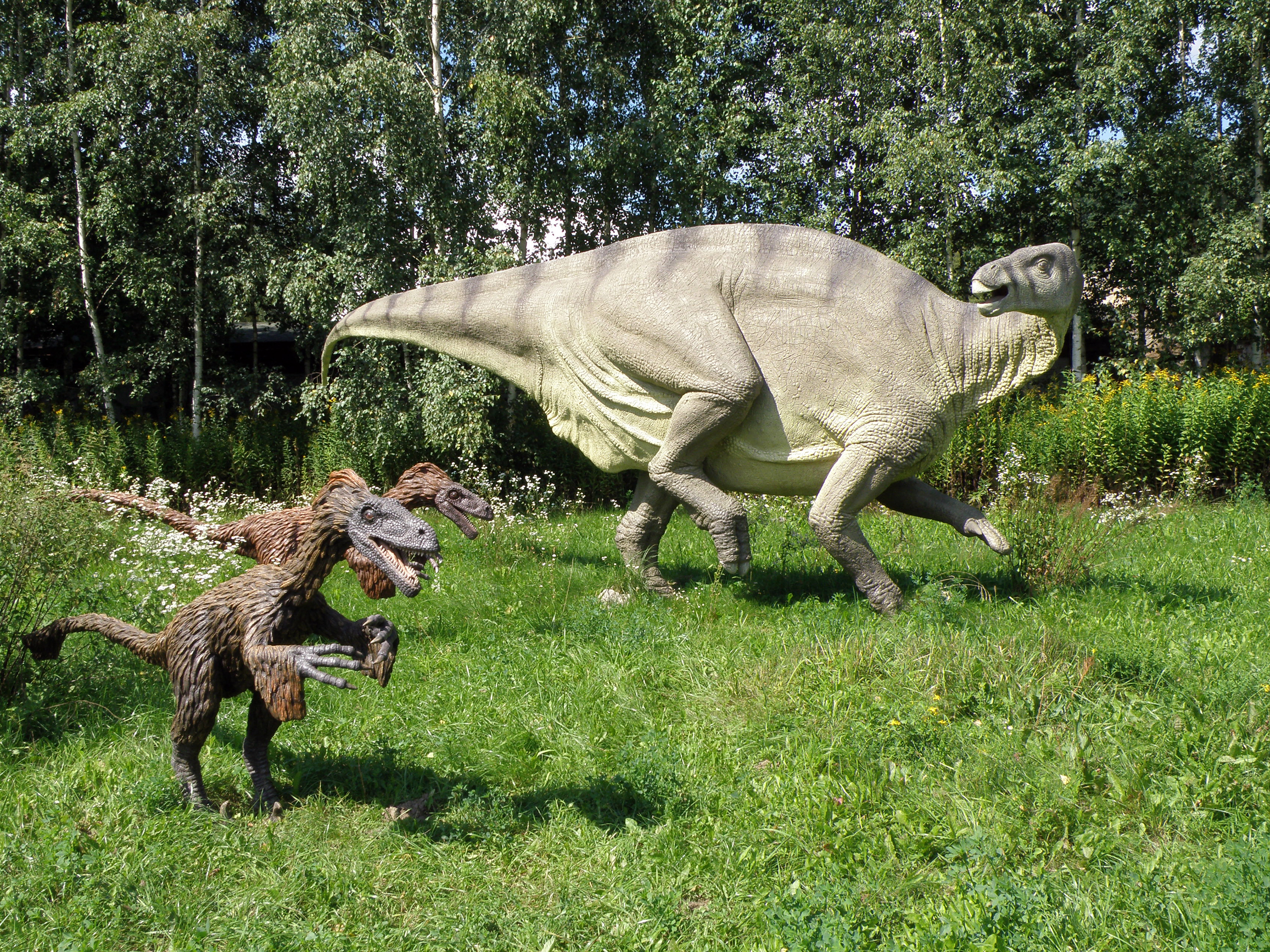
JuraPark
