= Ćmielów Porcelain Works =

Porcelain works in Poland

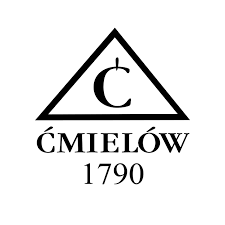
- Type: Spółka akcyjna
- Industry: Porcelain manufacturer
- Founded: 1790; 236 years ago
- Founder: Jacek Małachowski
- Headquarters: Ćmielów, Poland

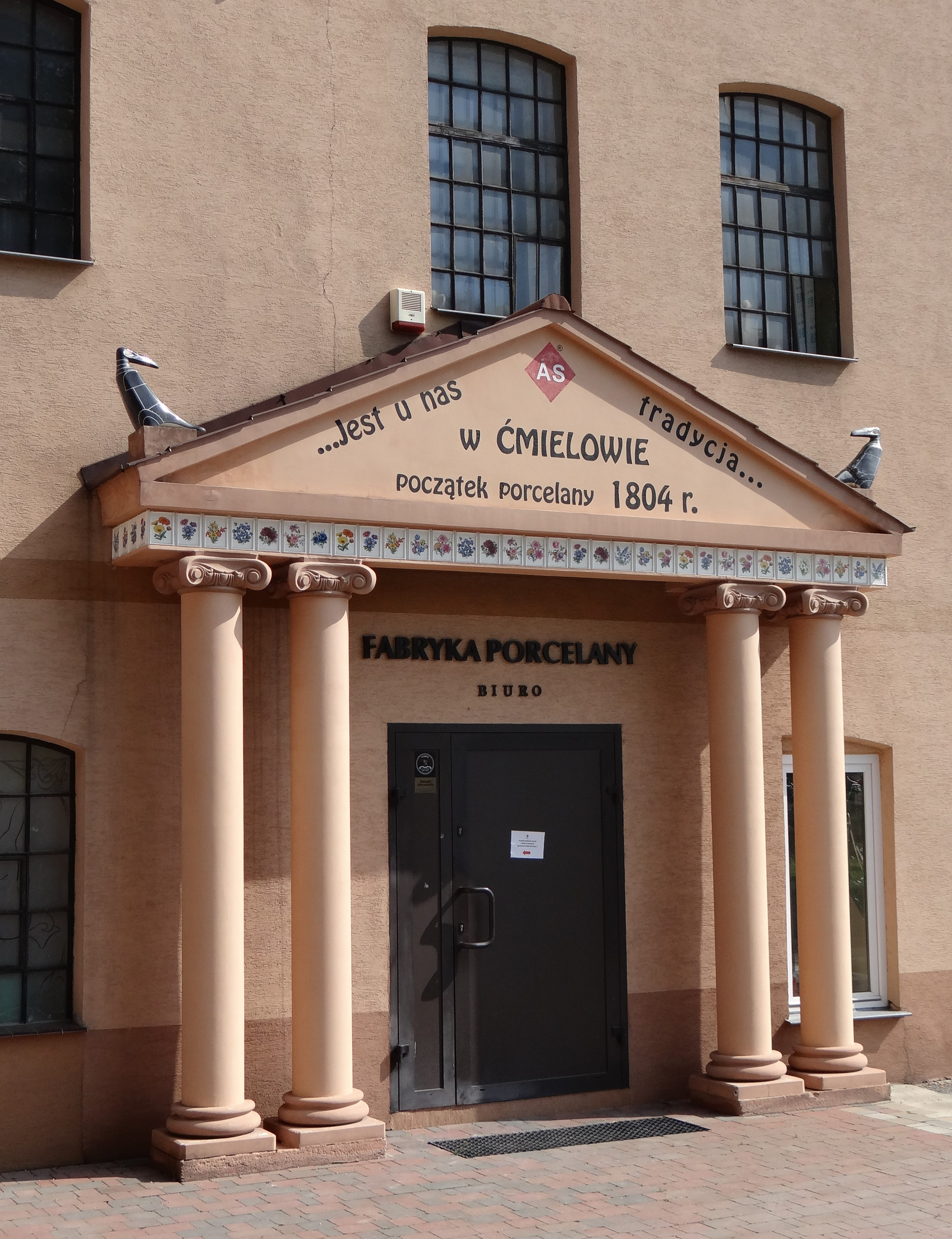
Ćmielów Porcelain offices, Ćmielów

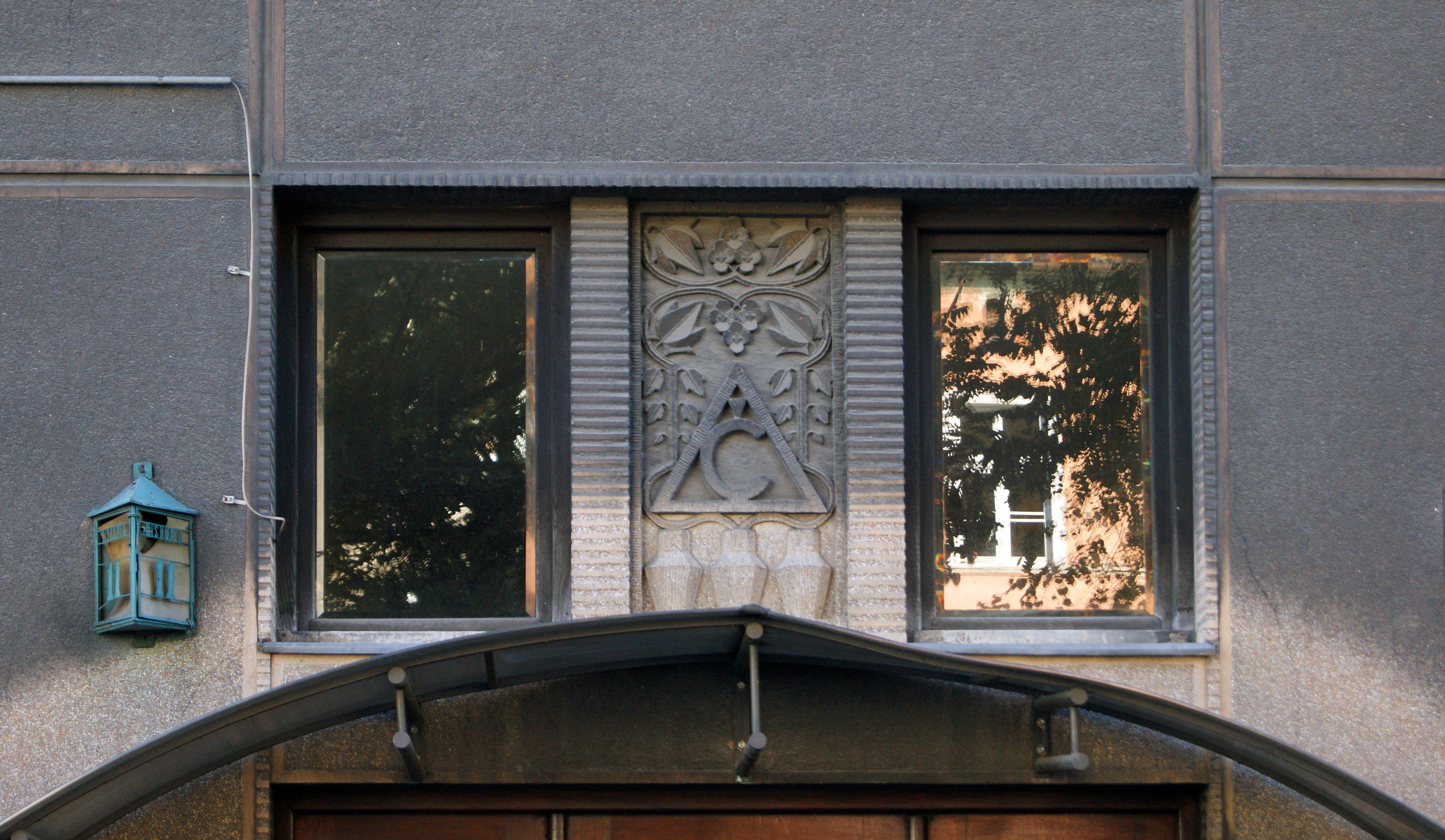
Ćmielów Porcelain logo, ulica Biskupia 11 (11 Bishop Street), Kraków, Poland

The Ćmielów Porcelain Works (Polish: Zakłady Porcelany „Ćmielów”; pronounced: [ˈt͡ɕmjɛluf]), in Ćmielów, Holy Cross Province, Poland, are the oldest and among the largest porcelain works in Poland, and the largest thin-walled-china works in Europe, their products described as "likely the most recognizable Polish porcelain." The Works trace their history to craft manufactories that were established in Ćmielów in the late 18th and early 19th centuries.

== History ==
The Ćmielów Porcelain Works trace their history to a craft manufactory that was established in the town of Ćmielów in 1790. Another milestone was the 1804 creation of a larger manufactory by Count Jacek Małachowski. Production of porcelain began in 1838 (previously, local ceramic production had been mostly of simpler varieties such as faience). In 1901 the firm received a grand prize at the All-Russia Exhibition in St. Petersburg. The manufactory changed owners several times, in 1921 becoming a S.A.-type corporation. In 1924, the firm acquired a smaller works in nearby Chodzież.

In 1946, the firm was nationalized in communist Poland. Also that year, Ćmielów Porcelain workers staged a strike protesting a three-month long shortage of flour.

Half a century later, in 1997, the firm was reprivatized and in the mid-2010s was split between two owners (Polskie Fabryki Porcelany „Ćmielów” i „Chodzież” SA; and Fabryki Porcelany AS).

== Designs ==
After 1840, Ćmielów products were often decorated with rural landscapes; scenes from history, mythology, or the Bible; and portraits of famous persons.

During the interwar period, the firm's flagship products designed by, among others, Bogdan Wendorf, became known internationally, with buyers including the royal court in Belgium and the Vatican City. Other notable designers working for the firm included Wincenty Potacki, Franciszek Kalfas, Józef Szewczyk, and Lubomir Tomaszewski. The Empire design was created in the 1930s by B. Wysocki and J. Steckiewicz, to the order of Polish President Ignacy Mościcki, for Warsaw's Royal Castle. The design is used in official settings throughout the world, including the Chancellery of the President of the Republic of Poland and the royal court in Belgium.

In the 1950s and 1960s, the firm produced "new-look" decorative Ćmielów figurines. New owners in post-communist Poland endeavored to renew their hand-made production and published a catalog. In 2004, the owners resumed their collaboration with artists Lubomir Tomaszewski and Mieczysław Naruszewicz, who had been behind the success of the 1960s figurines.

Ćmielów ceramics are exhibited in numerous Polish museums, the largest collection being at the National Museum in Kielce (Muzeum Narodowe w Kielcach).
