= Ćmielów figurines =

Decorative ceramic sculptures created in Poland

Ćmielów figurines are objects of small-scale (decorative) ceramic sculpture created in Poland during the 1950s and 1960s, reflecting the style of the so-called New Look or the Post-Sevastopol Thaw, cast in porcelain or porcelainite. They were designed by artists employed at the Institute of Industrial Design, particularly Henryk Jędrasiak, Mieczysław Naruszewicz, Hanna Orthwein, and Lubomir Tomaszewski, and produced in various ceramic manufacturing facilities across Poland. In 1964, the production of figurines designed by the Institute of Industrial Design was (with a few exceptions) moved to the Ćmielów Porcelain Works in Ćmielów.

Ćmielów figurines represent an important phenomenon in the applied arts of their time, with significance comparable to that of Nymphenburg and Meissen figurines in the 18th century and Copenhagen figurines in the era of modernism.

In 2021, the first biography of Lubomir Tomaszewski was published by Agora, authored by Katarzyna Rij and Jerzy A. Wlazło. The book explores the broader context associated with Ćmielów figurines.

== Historical background ==
In the 1950s, a four-member team of artists was established at the Institute of Industrial Design in Warsaw under the leadership of Henryk Jędrasiak. The team included young graduates of the Warsaw Academy of Fine Arts – Mirosław Naruszewicz, Hanna Orthwein, and Lubomir Tomaszewski. Their task was to create a new collection of porcelain sculptures, representing a contemporary take on decorative figurines. Work on the designs began in 1955, initially as experimental efforts due to the need to break away from traditional approaches to small-scale sculpture. Moreover, apart from Naruszewicz, the artists had no prior experience working with this type of material and needed to familiarize themselves with its properties.

The first design was completed in mid-1956. It was Akt – Końska Wenus by Henryk Jędrasiak. This figurine still bore features of the earlier style, characterized by numerous angular details and a decorative base. However, subsequent designs – Jędrasiak's Jeleń and Naruszewicz's Dzik – increasingly showcased new trends. These included simplified forms and a synthesis of the object's silhouette, with deliberate deformations emphasizing specific distinctive elements.

The production of the figurines was entrusted to several factories: the Bogucice Porcelain Works, the Porcelain and Porcelainite Works in Chodzież, the Ćmielów Porcelain Works, the Karolina Porcelain Works in Jaworzyna Śląska, the Tułowice Porcelainite Works, the Krzysztof Porcelain Works in Wałbrzych, and the Wałbrzych Porcelain Works. The figurines were produced under the supervision of their creators, though this oversight was rarely enforced. Designs were often adjusted locally for production, resulting in variations of the same project in different factories. For example, Sowa, designed by Hanna Orthwein, differs in claw shapes between the versions from Ćmielów and Karolina works.

In 1964, the production of all small-scale sculpture designs was taken over by the Świt division of the Ćmielów Porcelain Works. However, Tułowice retained the rights to produce most of the Institute of Industrial Design's figurines, while Bogucice did not transfer the original molds created in their facility.

Already in 1956, Ćmielów figurines achieved exhibition success at the Poznań International Fair. Until 1964, they were featured attractions at nearly all domestic and international exhibitions and trade fairs. They were showcased at the Leipzig Trade Fair, in New York and Chicago, at the Second Polish Industrial Exhibition in Moscow in 1959, and at the Polish Exhibition of Glass and Ceramics in Berlin.

The English magazine The Studio highlighted them in its annual special editions dedicated to the best designs in applied arts: in 1959 (Dzik and Batalion by M. Naruszewicz), 1960 (Gibbon by H. Orthwein and Kura by L. Tomaszewski), 1961 (Gołębie and Gazela by H. Jędrasiak), and 1962 (Bawół afrykański by L. Tomaszewski).

The design of these figurines continued at the Institute of Industrial Design until about 1965. During the late 1950s and early 1960s, they were widely available consumer goods. By the late 1970s, the Ćmielów Porcelain Works attempted to reintroduce them into production under a new program, but this effort met resistance and was not pursued further until the 1990s. In 1991, the Ćmielów factories declared bankruptcy, but their new owner initiated a reissue of the Institute of Industrial Design patterns.

The new owner, Adam Spała, purchased the Ćmielów Porcelain Works in 1996 and 1997. Along with the factory, he acquired the original molds and models of the figurines. Over four years, damaged designs were restored, a new design studio was established, and production resumed in 2000. Ćmielów figurines are now made from English porcelain, with each figurine accompanied by a certificate of authenticity, a serial number, a trademark (AS Ćmielów), the year of production, and, in some cases, a limited-edition label. In 2004, Adam Spała published a catalog featuring the figurines listed by their catalog names. The catalog includes photographs of the figurines, each labeled with a consecutive number, as well as information about the designer and the year the design was created.

The catalog also explains how to interpret the markings on the figurines. For numbered figurines, the markings follow this format: 1/13/02

- 1 represents the catalog number
- 13 indicates the sequential number of the figurine produced in that year
- 02 shows the year the figurine was created.

For items in a limited edition series, the marking would be: 13/500

- 13 is the sequential number of the figurine since 2000
- 500 represents the size of the edition.

The first figurines sold were numbered 13. Figurines numbered 1 to 12 were given a gold certificate and reserved for the owner of the AS Porcelain Factory and his friends.

=== Characteristics ===
Ćmielów figurines represent the style known as the New Look or the Post-Sevastopol Thaw, characterized by biomorphic lines, asymmetry, and abstract patterns. The shapes of the figurines simplify the silhouettes of the objects depicted, omitting details except for a few distinctive elements, which are emphasized and define the overall expression of the figurine, reflecting the essence of the object. This approach was based on the observation of nature and a deep understanding of the subject being portrayed. Transparency, lightness, and a sense of openness were used, evoking associations with the work of Henry Moore, as seen in Jędrasiak’s Sziedząca Dziewczyna and, particularly, in the works of Lubomir Tomaszewski (e.g., Dama z lustrem). Typically, the objects are depicted in a static pose, though some figurines suggest movement, such as Naruszewicz's Jeździec meksykański and Bizon.

Researchers have identified around 130 designs of Ćmielów figurines, though incomplete project documentation has led to challenges in attributing some of them. The thematic scope of the designs was inspired by the animal world, with an emphasis on domestic, farm, forest, exotic animals, and a few prehistoric creatures (e.g., Brontozaurus and Ichtiozaurus by H. Jędrasiak, Mamut by L. Tomaszewski), as well as birds. Human figures made up a smaller group.

Figurine models typically came in one size, with some exceptions, such as H. Orthwein's Pingwin, which was available in three sizes, and L. Tomaszewski's Pocałunek, which was produced in two sizes. There were also designs featuring group compositions, the first being H. Jędrasiak’s Gołąbki, which consisted of two figurines. A unique case was the two-part sculptures by Jędrasiak – Pawian, Marabut, and Bażant – which consisted of two separate pieces that formed a complete figurine when assembled. These were not introduced into mass production and remained in the prototype stage.

An important element influencing the final form of the figurines was their painting. In addition to glaze painting, spray painting and selective spraying techniques were used. These techniques enhanced the realism of the design, mimicking the feathers or fur of animals (as in Naruszewicz's Czapla), or emphasized the sculptural qualities with an abstract character. Although bold and expressive colors were used (e.g., Arabka by L. Tomaszewski), the most common palette was a range of greys, based on contrasts of white and black, reflecting the existentialist fashion prevailing in the culture. Multiple painting designs were created for one model, sometimes changing the entire expression of the figurine (e.g., Śpiewaczka by L. Tomaszewski).

The painters involved in the decoration of these figurines included designers from the Institute of Industrial Design, such as Zofia Palowa, Barbara Frybes, Zofia Przybyszewska, Zofia Galińska, Jadwiga Adamczewska-Miklaszewska, and Danuta Duszniak. According to Barbara Banaś, some of the painting designs were also created within the factories that produced the figurines.

== Designers ==
The main designers of Ćmielów figurines were members of the team formed at the Institute of Industrial Design: Henryk Jędrasiak, Mieczysław Naruszewicz, Hanna Orthwein, and Lubomir Tomaszewski:

- Henryk Jędrasiak was the author of 24 models, including both human and animal figures. He did not shy away from abstraction but avoided distorting the shapes, simplifying them instead. Objects were often reduced to the shape of a triangle, as seen in Ryba skalar. By twisting the head or torso of the object, he added dynamics to the figurine. Most of his designs were decorated in black and white. He believed that decoration should fit the form well and organize its surface appropriately.
- Mieczysław Naruszewicz was the author of 44 models, primarily animal figures, especially birds. When simplifying the depicted figures, he reduced the number of support points, such as in his Dzik design, where the limbs of the animal are connected.
- Hanna Orthwein created 33 models and was a well-regarded animalist. She claimed that each of her projects aimed to illustrate a specific construction or compositional problem, refer to trends in contemporary art, and prepare the viewer for a better understanding of it.
- Lubomir Tomaszewski designed 34 models, focusing mostly on human figures. He was the boldest of the team when it came to deformation, using straight lines to emphasize verticality. He promoted the image of the modern woman, creating slender figures with hair tied in a ponytail, such as in Dziewczyna w spodniach. He applied bold decorations with distinct color patches.

In the 1950s and 1960s, small-scale sculptural works were created that were not directly considered Ćmielów figurines by researchers, but they fit the aesthetic created by them. These works came from other designers associated with the Institute of Industrial Design, as well as from designers employed in modeling centers established by a 1952 directive at porcelain factories.

Other designers at the Institute of Industrial Design involved in the creation of figurines include Zdana Kosicka, who created models of Kotek/Kotek Siedzący and Konik/Konik mały in the early 1950s, and Liliana Borenowska-Ziemka, who created a Kotek model in the 1950s. Kosicka’s Kotek was realized at the Bogucice factory, while the other two models were produced in Ćmielów. In Ćmielów, Wincenty Potacki designed Wesoły byczek (Fernando) and Kazimierz Czuba designed Zajączek/Zajączek ze stojącymi słuchami.

At the Bogucice factory, Paweł Karasek designed Dziewczyna z gitarą/Dziewczyna z mandoliną, and Eryka Trzewik-Drost created five designs, including Pierwszy bal. For the Krzysztof factories in Wałbrzych, Stanisław Olszamowski designed Biały niedźwiedź and Panna plażowa, while Zbigniewa Śliwowska-Wawrzyniak created Grzybiarka/Dama z koszykiem. Jan Kwinta, head of the modeling center at Krzysztof, designed Mrówkojad.

In addition to the models mentioned above, there are several figurine designs created in Chodzież, Karolina, and Krzysztof factories whose designers remain unidentified. Some of them are attributed to Jędrasiak, Naruszewicz, Orthwein, or Tomaszewski.

== Bibliography ==
- Banaś, Barbara (2011). Polski new look. Ceramika użytkowa lat 50. i 60 [Polish New Look: Functional Ceramics of the 1950s and 1960s] (in Polish). Wrocław: Studio Baka. ISBN 978-83-933926-0-5.
- Hübner-Wojciechowska, Joanna (2014). Lata 60. XX wieku. Sztuka użytkowa [The 1960s: Applied Arts] (in Polish). Warsaw: Arkady. ISBN 978-83-213-4856-8.
- Kołodziejowa, Bolesława; Stadnicki, Zbigniew M. (1986). Zakłady Porcelany Ćmielów [Ćmielów Porcelain Works] (in Polish). Kraków: Krajowa Agencja Wydawnicza. ISBN 83-03-01336-X.
