= Buszkowice =

Buszkowice may refer to the following places in Poland:

- Buszkowice, Lower Silesian Voivodeship (south-west Poland)
- Buszkowice, Subcarpathian Voivodeship (south-east Poland)
- Buszkowice, Świętokrzyskie Voivodeship (south-central Poland)
