= Glinka, Ostrowiec County =

Glinka
- Village
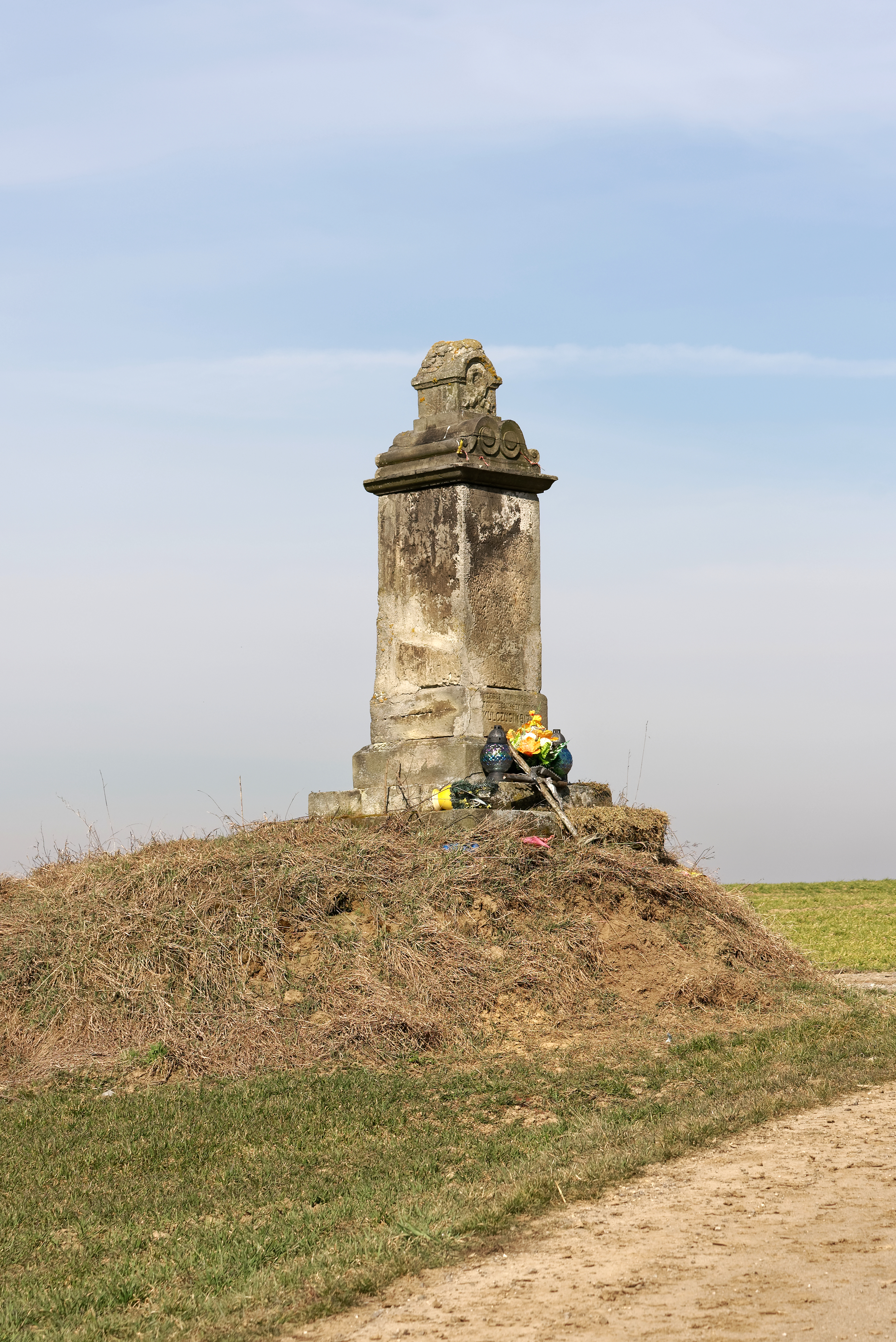
- Shrine

- Location within Poland
- Coordinates: 50°51′37″N 21°31′3″E
- Country: Poland
- Voivodeship: Świętokrzyskie
- County: Ostrowiec
- Gmina: Ćmielów
- Population: 30

Glinka [ˈɡlinka] is a village in the administrative district of Gmina Ćmielów, within Ostrowiec County, Świętokrzyskie Voivodeship, in south-central Poland. It lies approximately 4 km (2 mi) south of Ćmielów, 12 km (7 mi) south-east of Ostrowiec Świętokrzyski, and 64 km (40 mi) east of the regional capital Kielce.
