= Czarna Glina =

- Village
- Location within Poland
- Coordinates: 50°56′13″N 21°30′17″E
- Country: Poland
- Voivodeship: Świętokrzyskie
- County: Ostrowiec
- Gmina: Ćmielów
- Population: 20

Czarna Glina [ˈt͡ʂarna ˈɡlina] is a village in the administrative district of Gmina Ćmielów, within Ostrowiec County, Świętokrzyskie Voivodeship, in south-central Poland. It lies approximately 6 km (4 mi) north of Ćmielów, 8 km (5 mi) east of Ostrowiec Świętokrzyski, and 63 km (39 mi) east of the regional capital Kielce.
