= Drzenkowice =

- Village
- Location within Poland
- Coordinates: 50°52′11″N 21°27′37″E
- Country: Poland
- Voivodeship: Świętokrzyskie
- County: Ostrowiec
- Gmina: Ćmielów
- Population: 70

Drzenkowice [dʐɛnkɔˈvit͡sɛ] is a village in the administrative district of Gmina Ćmielów, within Ostrowiec County, Świętokrzyskie Voivodeship, in south-central Poland. It lies approximately 5 km (3 mi) south-west of Ćmielów, 9 km (6 mi) south-east of Ostrowiec Świętokrzyski, and 60 km (37 mi) east of the regional capital Kielce.
