= Piaski Brzóstowskie =

- Village
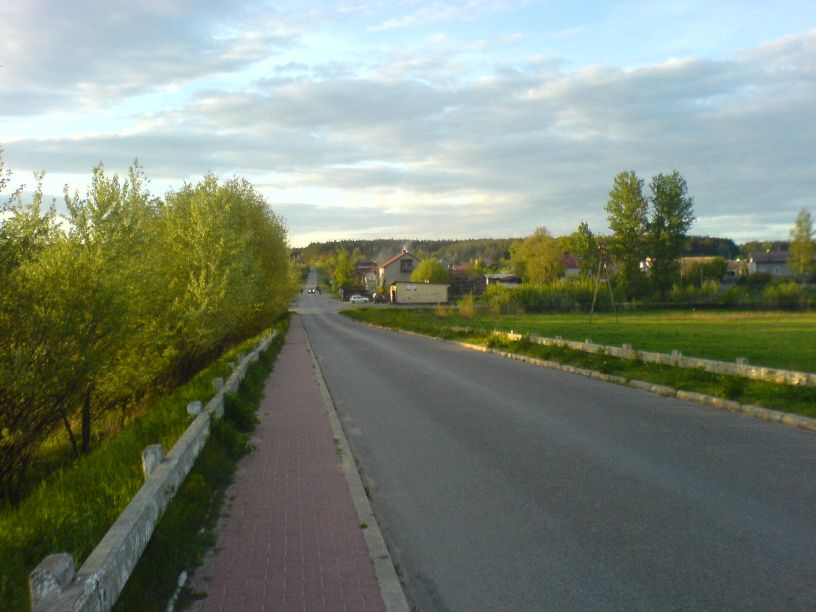

- Location within Poland
- Coordinates: 50°54′26″N 21°29′40″E
- Country: Poland
- Voivodeship: Świętokrzyskie
- County: Ostrowiec
- Gmina: Ćmielów
- Population: 770
- Website: http://www.piaski.ath.cx/

Piaski Brzóstowskie (Polish pronunciation: [ˈpjaskʲi bʐusˈtɔfskʲɛ]) is a village in the administrative district of Gmina Ćmielów, within Ostrowiec County, Świętokrzyskie Voivodeship, in south-central Poland. It lies approximately 3 km (2 mi) north-west of Ćmielów, 8 km (5 mi) south-east of Ostrowiec Świętokrzyski, and 62 km (39 mi) east of the regional capital Kielce.
