= Ruda Kościelna =

- Village
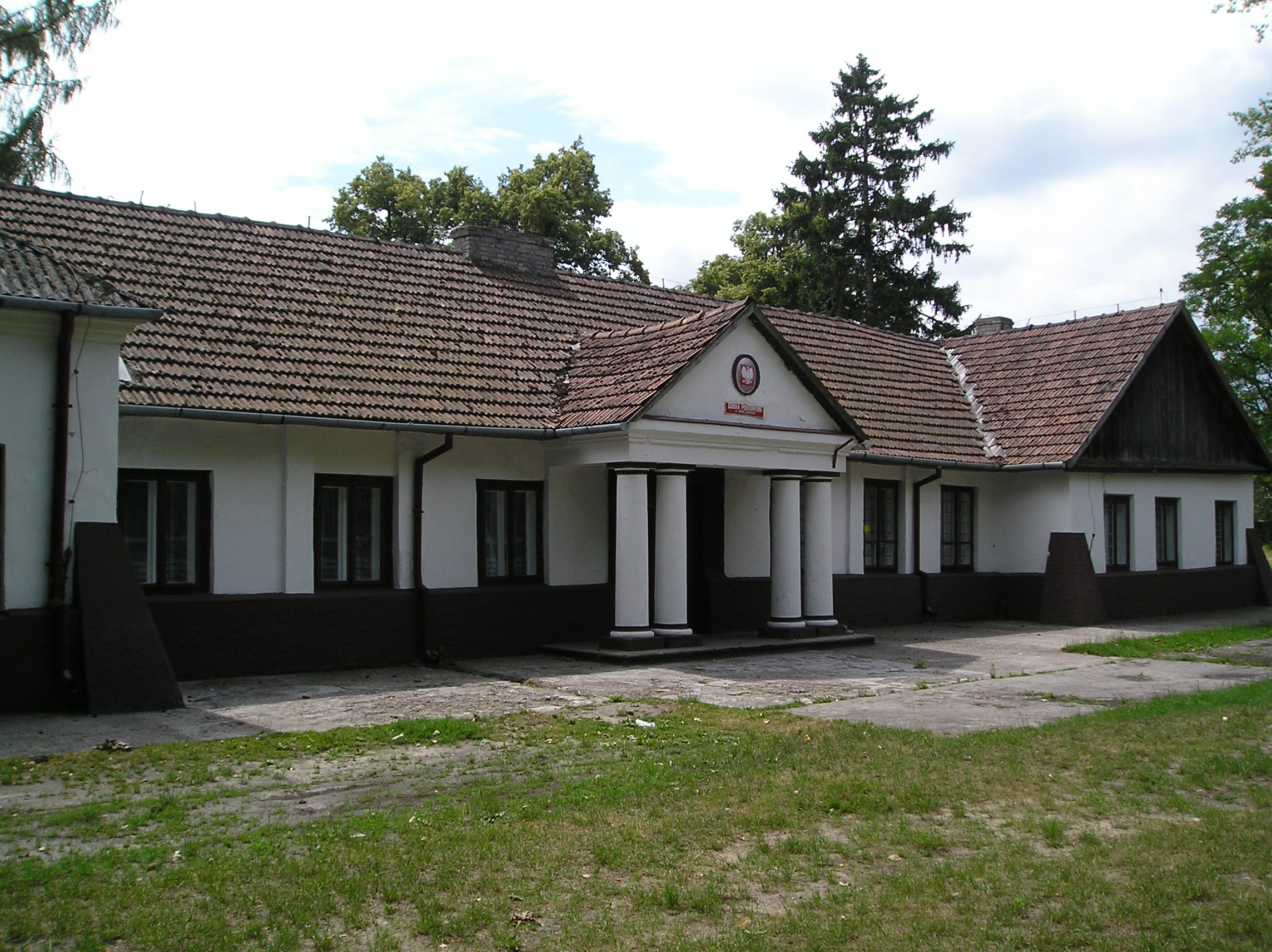
- Manor

- Location within Poland
- Coordinates: 50°56′49″N 21°32′57″E
- Country: Poland
- Voivodeship: Świętokrzyskie
- County: Ostrowiec
- Gmina: Ćmielów

Population
  - Total: 280

Ruda Kościelna [ˈruda kɔɕˈt͡ɕɛlna] is a village in the administrative district of Gmina Ćmielów, within Ostrowiec County, Świętokrzyskie Voivodeship, in south-central Poland. It lies approximately 7 km (4 mi) north of Ćmielów, 11 km (7 mi) east of Ostrowiec Świętokrzyski, and 66 km (41 mi) east of the regional capital Kielce.

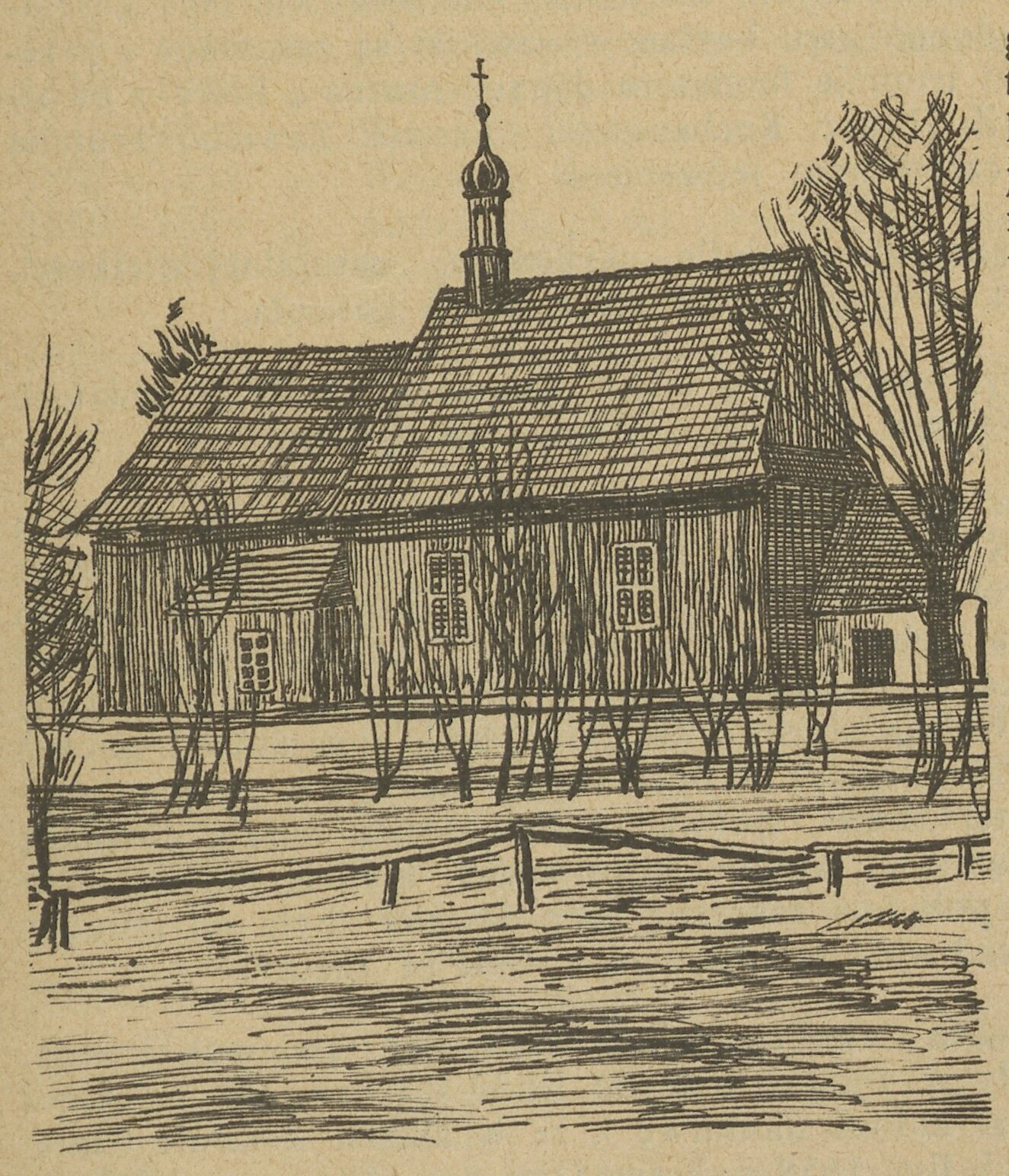
Church of the Espousals of the Blessed Virgin Mary before 1907
