= Wojnowice, Ostrowiec County =

Wojnowice
- Village
- Location within Poland
- Coordinates: 50°52′11″N 21°33′39″E
- Country: Poland
- Voivodeship: Świętokrzyskie
- County: Ostrowiec
- Gmina: Ćmielów
- Population: 210

Wojnowice [vɔi̯nɔˈvit͡sɛ] is a village in the administrative district of Gmina Ćmielów, within Ostrowiec County, Świętokrzyskie Voivodeship, in south-central Poland. It lies approximately 4 km (2 mi) south-east of Ćmielów, 14 km (9 mi) south-east of Ostrowiec Świętokrzyski, and 67 km (42 mi) east of the regional capital Kielce.
