= Podgórze, Ostrowiec County =

Podgórze
- Village
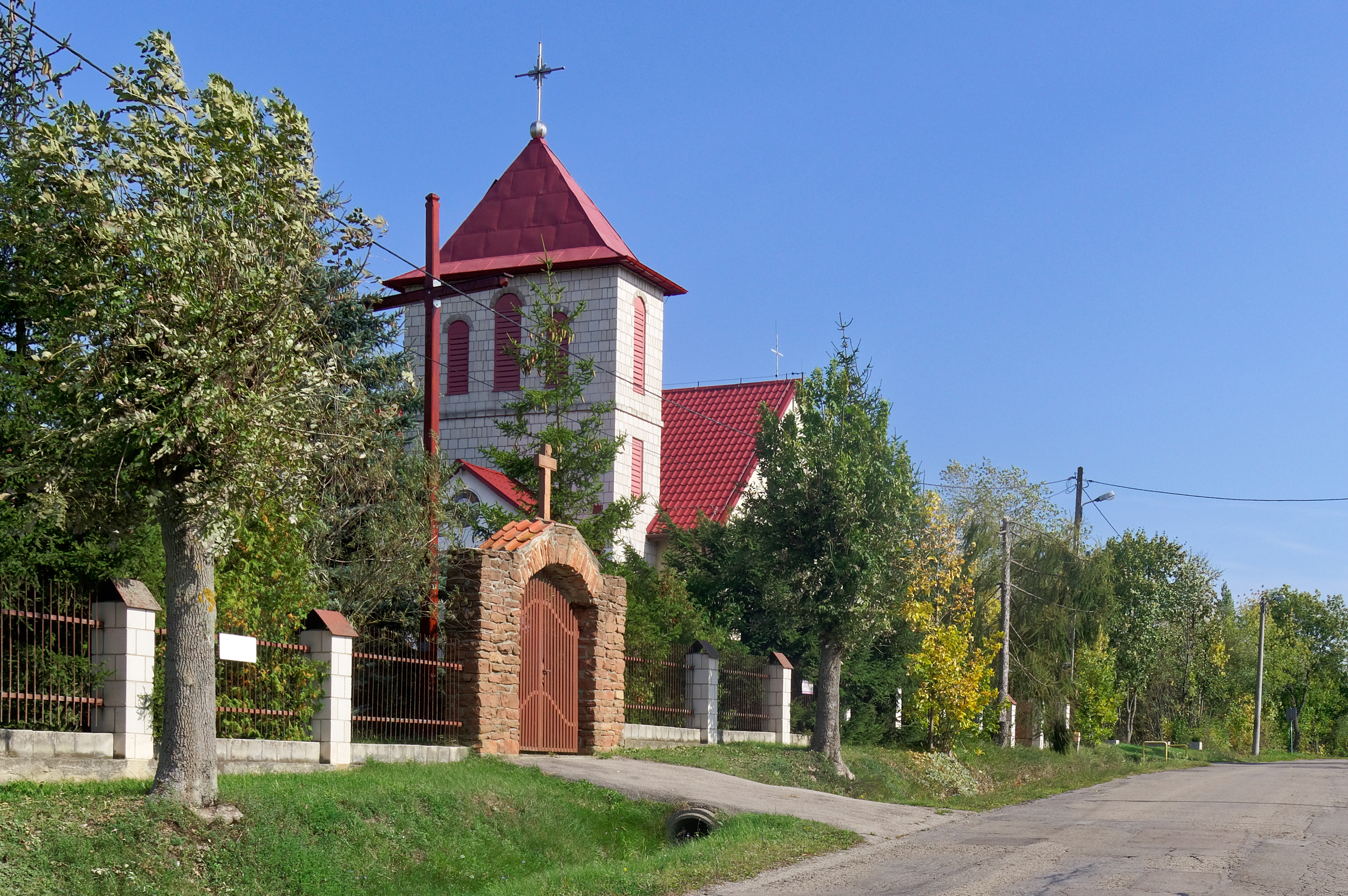

- Location within Poland
- Coordinates: 50°58′43″N 21°34′1″E
- Country: Poland
- Voivodeship: Świętokrzyskie
- County: Ostrowiec
- Gmina: Ćmielów

Podgórze [pɔdˈɡuʐɛ] is a village in the administrative district of Gmina Ćmielów, within Ostrowiec County, Świętokrzyskie Voivodeship, in south-central Poland. It lies approximately 11 km (7 mi) north of Ćmielów, 13 km (8 mi) north-east of Ostrowiec Świętokrzyski, and 68 km (42 mi) east of the regional capital Kielce.
