= Wola Grójecka =

- Village
- Location within Poland
- Coordinates: 50°53′10″N 21°28′8″E
- Country: Poland
- Voivodeship: Świętokrzyskie
- County: Ostrowiec
- Gmina: Ćmielów
- Population: 120

Wola Grójecka [ˈvɔla ɡruˈjɛt͡ska] is a village in the administrative district of Gmina Ćmielów, within Ostrowiec County, Świętokrzyskie Voivodeship, in south-central Poland. It lies approximately 4 km (2 mi) west of Ćmielów, 8 km (5 mi) south-east of Ostrowiec Świętokrzyski, and 60 km (37 mi) east of the regional capital Kielce.
