= Jastków, Świętokrzyskie Voivodeship =

Jastków
- Village
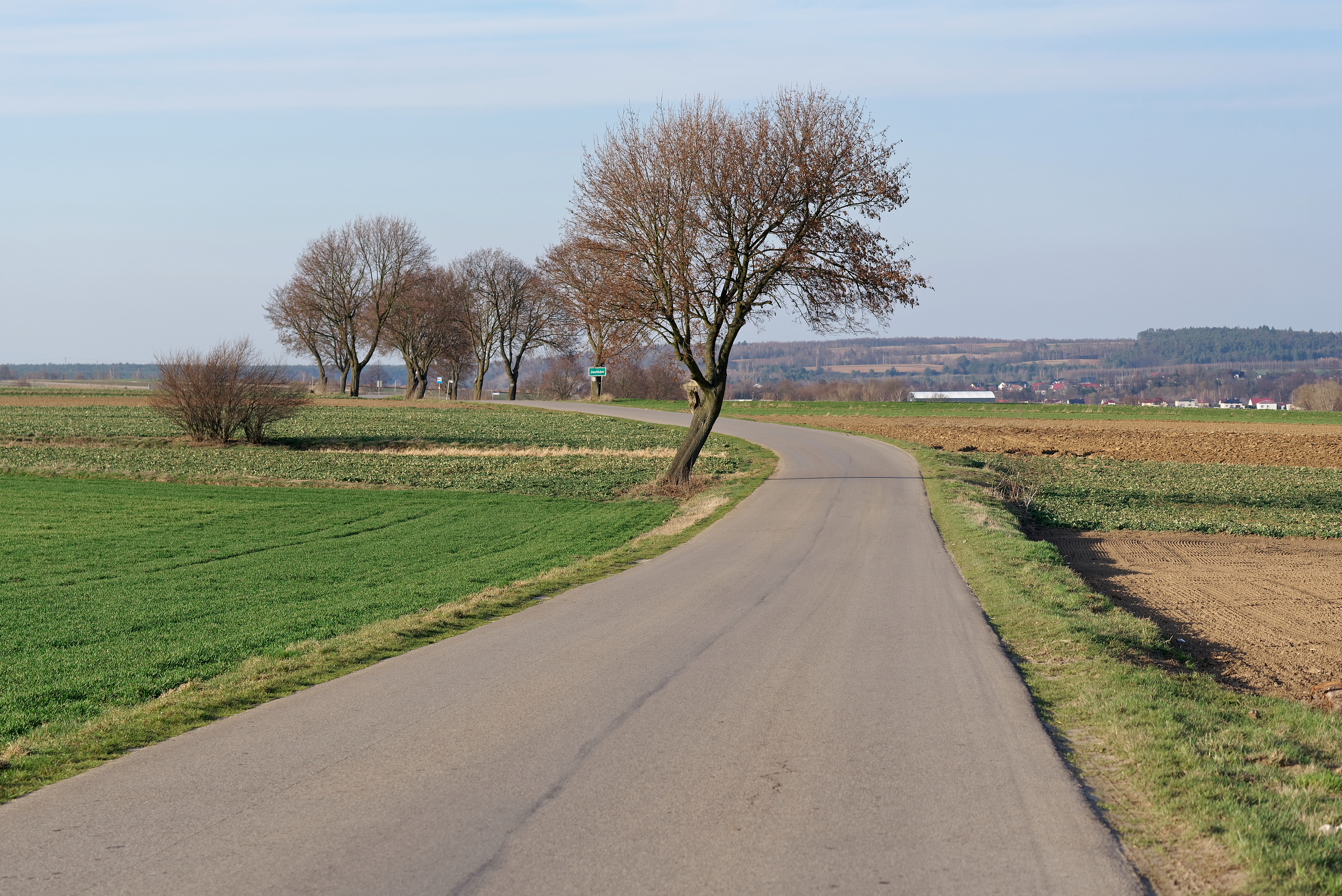

- Location within Poland
- Coordinates: 50°52′23″N 21°32′0″E
- Country: Poland
- Voivodeship: Świętokrzyskie
- County: Ostrowiec
- Gmina: Ćmielów
- Population: 200

Jastków [ˈjastkuf] is a village in the administrative district of Gmina Ćmielów, within Ostrowiec County, Świętokrzyskie Voivodeship, in south-central Poland. It lies approximately 3 km (2 mi) south-east of Ćmielów, 12 km (7 mi) south-east of Ostrowiec Świętokrzyski, and 65 km (40 mi) east of the regional capital Kielce.
