= Turchak =

Turchak is a surname. Notable people with the surname include:

- Andrey Turchak (born 1975), Russian politician
- Olga Turchak (born 1967), Kazakhstani high jumper
- Stefan Turchak (1938–1988), Ukrainian conductor
