= Stoki Duże =

- Village
- Location within Poland
- Coordinates: 50°57′15″N 21°33′37″E
- Country: Poland
- Voivodeship: Świętokrzyskie
- County: Ostrowiec
- Gmina: Ćmielów
- Population: 100

Stoki Duże [ˈstɔki ˈduʐɛ] is a village in the administrative district of Gmina Ćmielów, within Ostrowiec County, Świętokrzyskie Voivodeship, in south-central Poland. It lies approximately 8 km (5 mi) north-east of Ćmielów, 12 km (7 mi) east of Ostrowiec Świętokrzyski, and 67 km (42 mi) east of the regional capital Kielce.
