= Wólka Wojnowska =

- Village
- Location within Poland
- Coordinates: 50°52′41″N 21°33′11″E
- Country: Poland
- Voivodeship: Świętokrzyskie
- County: Ostrowiec
- Gmina: Ćmielów
- Population: 210

Wólka Wojnowska [ˈvulka vɔi̯ˈnɔfska] is a village in the administrative district of Gmina Ćmielów, within Ostrowiec County, Świętokrzyskie Voivodeship, in south-central Poland. It lies approximately 4 km (2 mi) south-east of Ćmielów, 13 km (8 mi) south-east of Ostrowiec Świętokrzyski, and 66 km (41 mi) east of the regional capital Kielce.
