= Borownia =

- Village
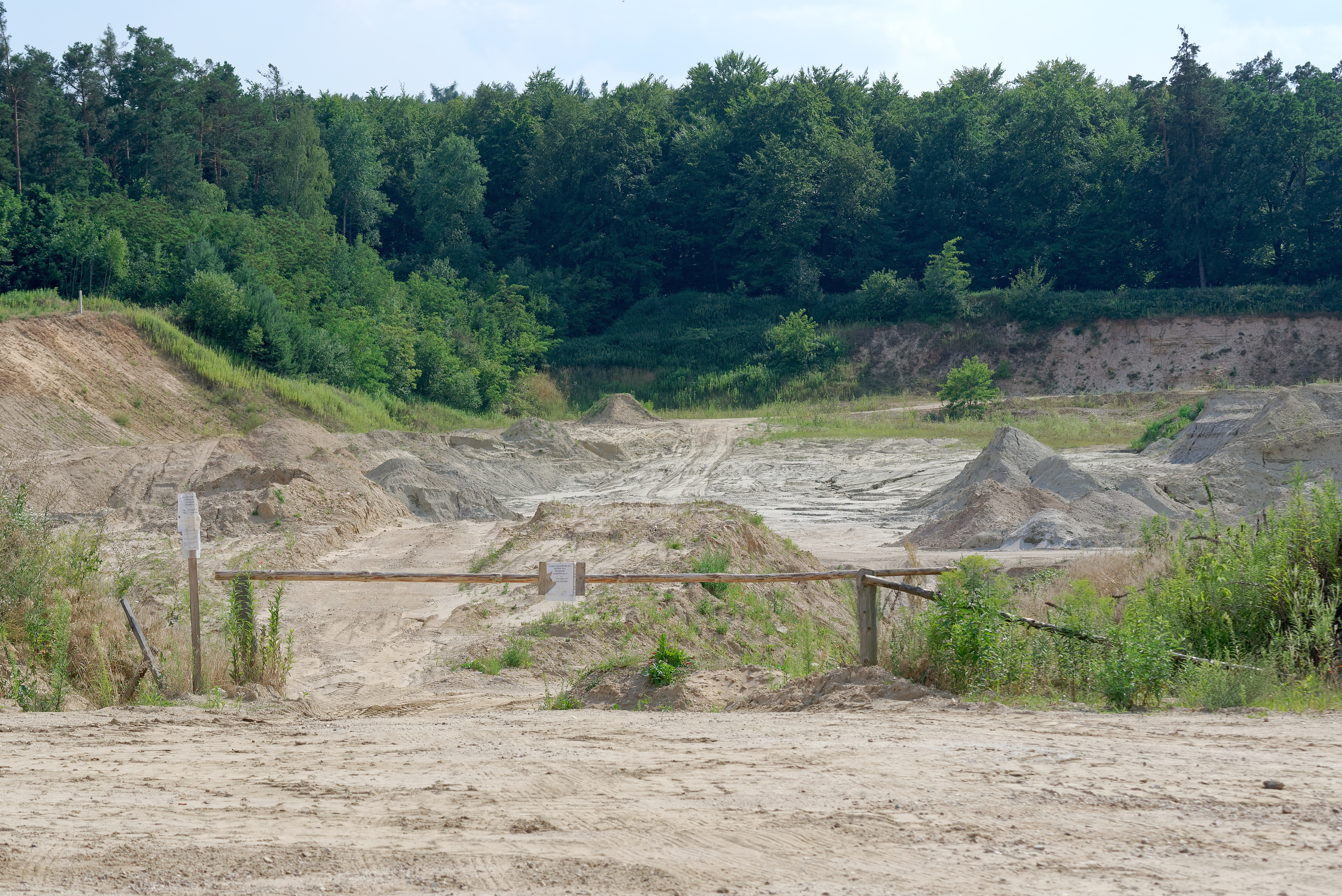
- Sand mine

- Location within Poland
- Coordinates: 50°55′3″N 21°33′45″E
- Country: Poland
- Voivodeship: Świętokrzyskie
- County: Ostrowiec
- Gmina: Ćmielów
- Population: 30

Borownia [bɔˈrɔvɲa] is a village in the administrative district of Gmina Ćmielów, within Ostrowiec County, Świętokrzyskie Voivodeship, in south-central Poland. It lies approximately 5 km (3 mi) north-east of Ćmielów, 12 km (7 mi) east of Ostrowiec Świętokrzyski, and 67 km (42 mi) east of the regional capital Kielce.
