= Łysowody =

- Village
- Location within Poland
- Coordinates: 50°54′17″N 21°33′58″E
- Country: Poland
- Voivodeship: Świętokrzyskie
- County: Ostrowiec
- Gmina: Ćmielów
- Population: 30

Łysowody [wɨsɔˈvɔdɨ] is a village in the administrative district of Gmina Ćmielów, within Ostrowiec County, Świętokrzyskie Voivodeship, in south-central Poland. It lies approximately 4 km (2 mi) north-east of Ćmielów, 13 km (8 mi) east of Ostrowiec Świętokrzyski, and 67 km (42 mi) east of the regional capital Kielce.
