= Grójec, Świętokrzyskie Voivodeship =

Grójec
- Village
- Location within Poland
- Coordinates: 50°53′59″N 21°28′18″E
- Country: Poland
- Voivodeship: Świętokrzyskie
- County: Ostrowiec
- Gmina: Ćmielów
- Population: 550

Grójec [ˈɡrujɛt͡s] is a village in the administrative district of Gmina Ćmielów, within Ostrowiec County, Świętokrzyskie Voivodeship, in south-central Poland. It lies approximately 4 km (2 mi) west of Ćmielów, 7 km (4 mi) south-east of Ostrowiec Świętokrzyski, and 61 km (38 mi) east of the regional capital Kielce.
