= Ćmielów Castle =

Ruined castle in Poland

Coordinates: 50°53′25″N 21°30′53″E

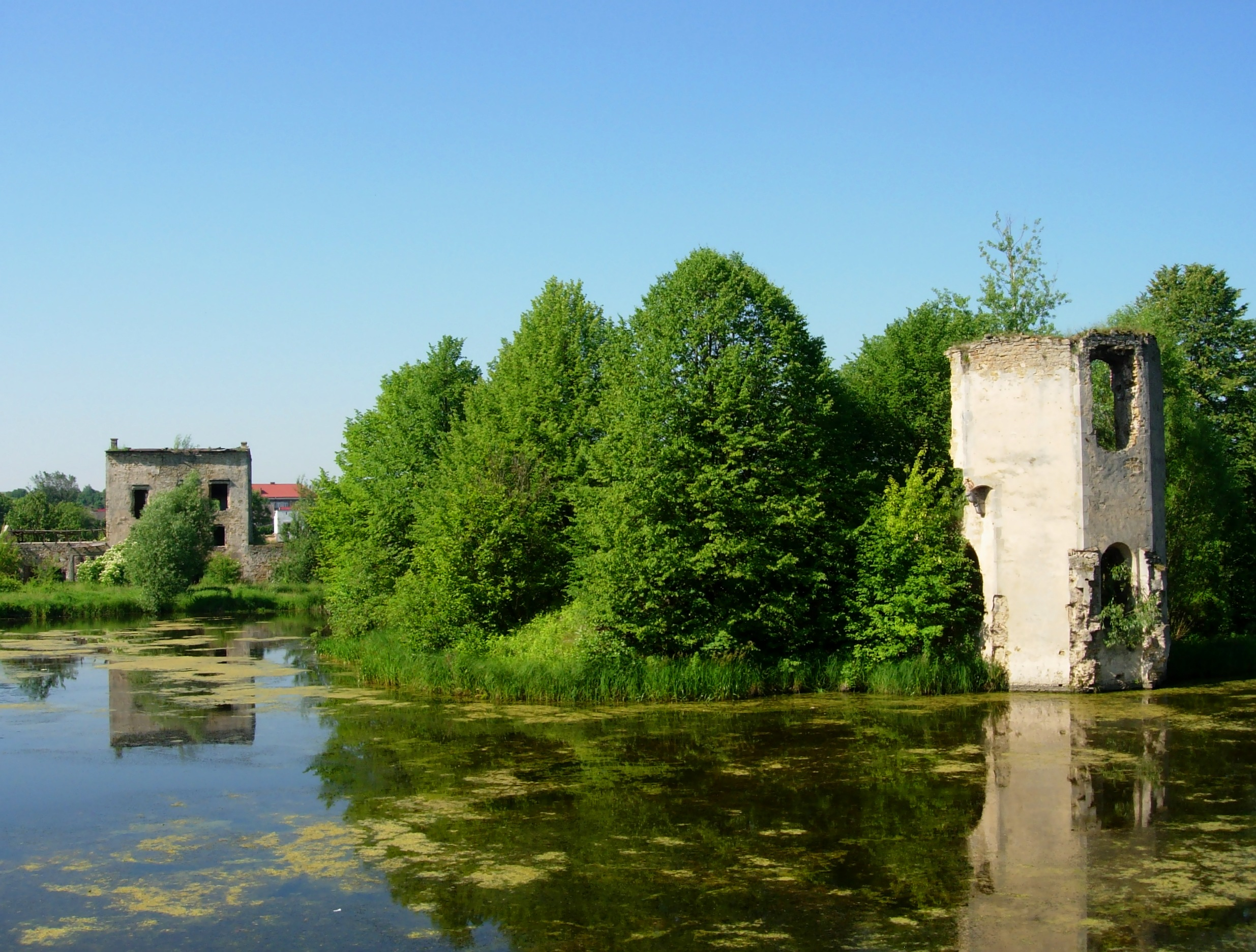
Ćmielów Castle

Ćmielów Castle (Polish: Zamek w Ćmielowie) is a ruined castle in Ćmielów, Poland. It appears in documents in 1388, but rather they relate to the nearby fortress Podgrodzie. The existing ruins are the remains of a castle built in the years 1519-1531 by Krzysztof Szydłowiecki.

== History ==
The castle consisted of two parts, the proper castle invested on the island and the ward from the south gate tower. There were two residential buildings connected to the castle chapel. The chapel consisted of a nave and chancel located in the basement, with living quarters above it. Over the gate is placed a foundation tablet from 1531. The castle belonged to the Tarnowski, Ostrogski, Wiśniowiecki, Sanguszko and Małachowski families. In 1657 it was conquered by the Swedes, and in 1702 partly demolished.

In about 1800, the ward was converted into a brewery. Fragments of the walls remain, including walls of the ward gate tower connected to the outbuilding. Traces of bastions have survived too, except one, situated on the south-east, which was completely destroyed.

== See also ==
- Castles in Poland
