= Krzczonowice, Ostrowiec County =

Krzczonowice
- Village
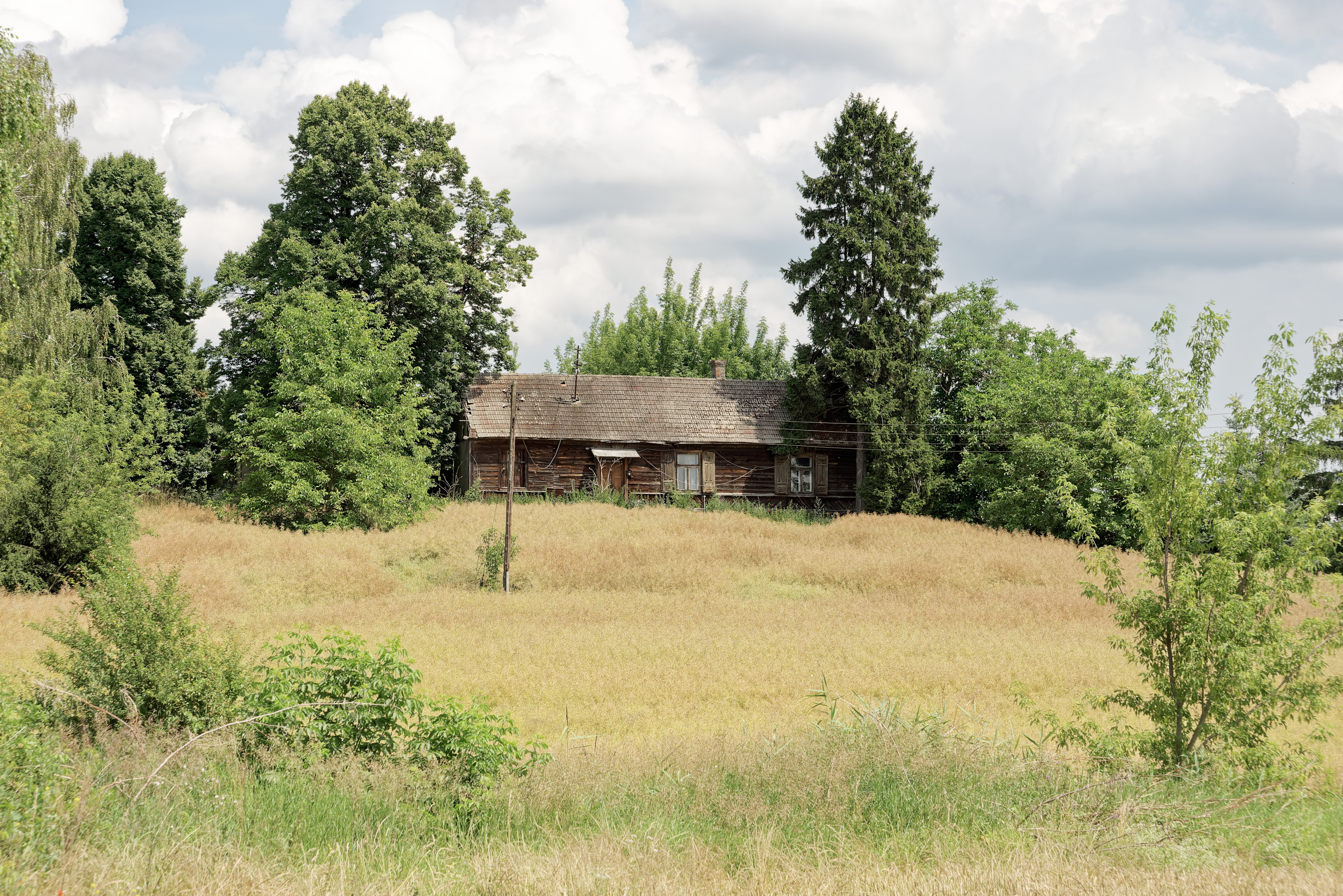

- Location within Poland
- Coordinates: 50°51′46″N 21°29′34″E
- Country: Poland
- Voivodeship: Świętokrzyskie
- County: Ostrowiec
- Gmina: Ćmielów
- Population: 270

Krzczonowice [kʂt͡ʂɔnɔˈvit͡sɛ] is a village in the administrative district of Gmina Ćmielów, within Ostrowiec County, Świętokrzyskie Voivodeship, in south-central Poland. It lies approximately 4 km (2 mi) south-west of Ćmielów, 11 km (7 mi) south-east of Ostrowiec Świętokrzyski, and 62 km (39 mi) east of the regional capital Kielce.
