= Boria, Poland =

Boria
- Village
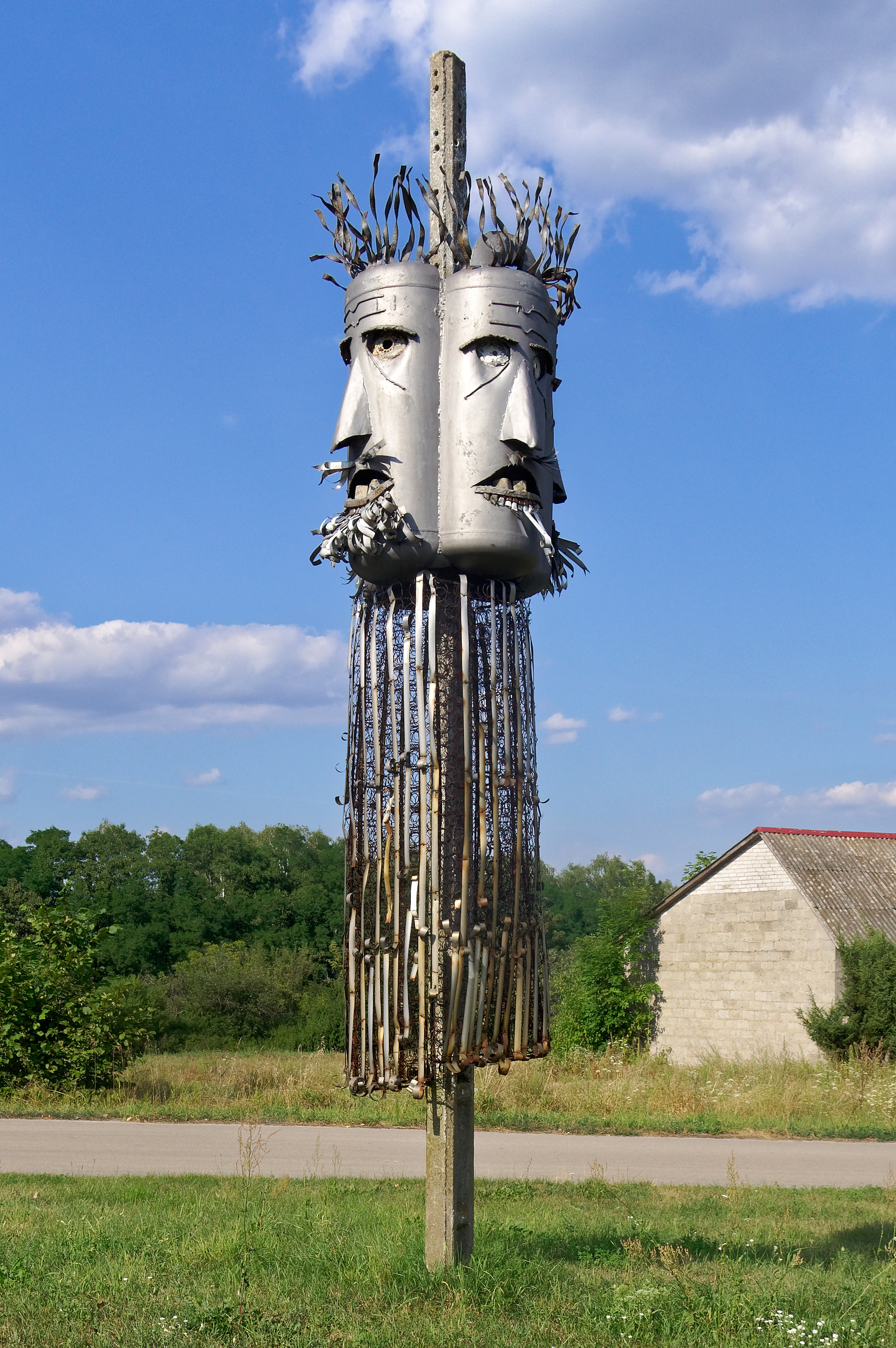
- Svetovit statue

- Location within Poland
- Coordinates: 50°58′20″N 21°33′5″E
- Country: Poland
- Voivodeship: Świętokrzyskie
- County: Ostrowiec
- Gmina: Ćmielów
- Population: 270

Boria [ˈbɔrja] is a village in the administrative district of Gmina Ćmielów, within Ostrowiec County, Świętokrzyskie Voivodeship, in south-central Poland. It lies approximately 10 km (6 mi) north of Ćmielów, 12 km (7 mi) east of Ostrowiec Świętokrzyski, and 67 km (42 mi) east of the regional capital Kielce.
