= Stoki Małe =

- Village
- Location within Poland
- Coordinates: 50°57′50″N 21°32′57″E
- Country: Poland
- Voivodeship: Świętokrzyskie
- County: Ostrowiec
- Gmina: Ćmielów
- Population: 90

Stoki Małe [ˈstɔki ˈmawɛ] is a village in the administrative district of Gmina Ćmielów, within Ostrowiec County, Świętokrzyskie Voivodeship, in south-central Poland. It lies approximately 9 km (6 mi) north of Ćmielów, 11 km (7 mi) east of Ostrowiec Świętokrzyski, and 67 km (42 mi) east of the regional capital Kielce.
