= Przeuszyn =

- Village
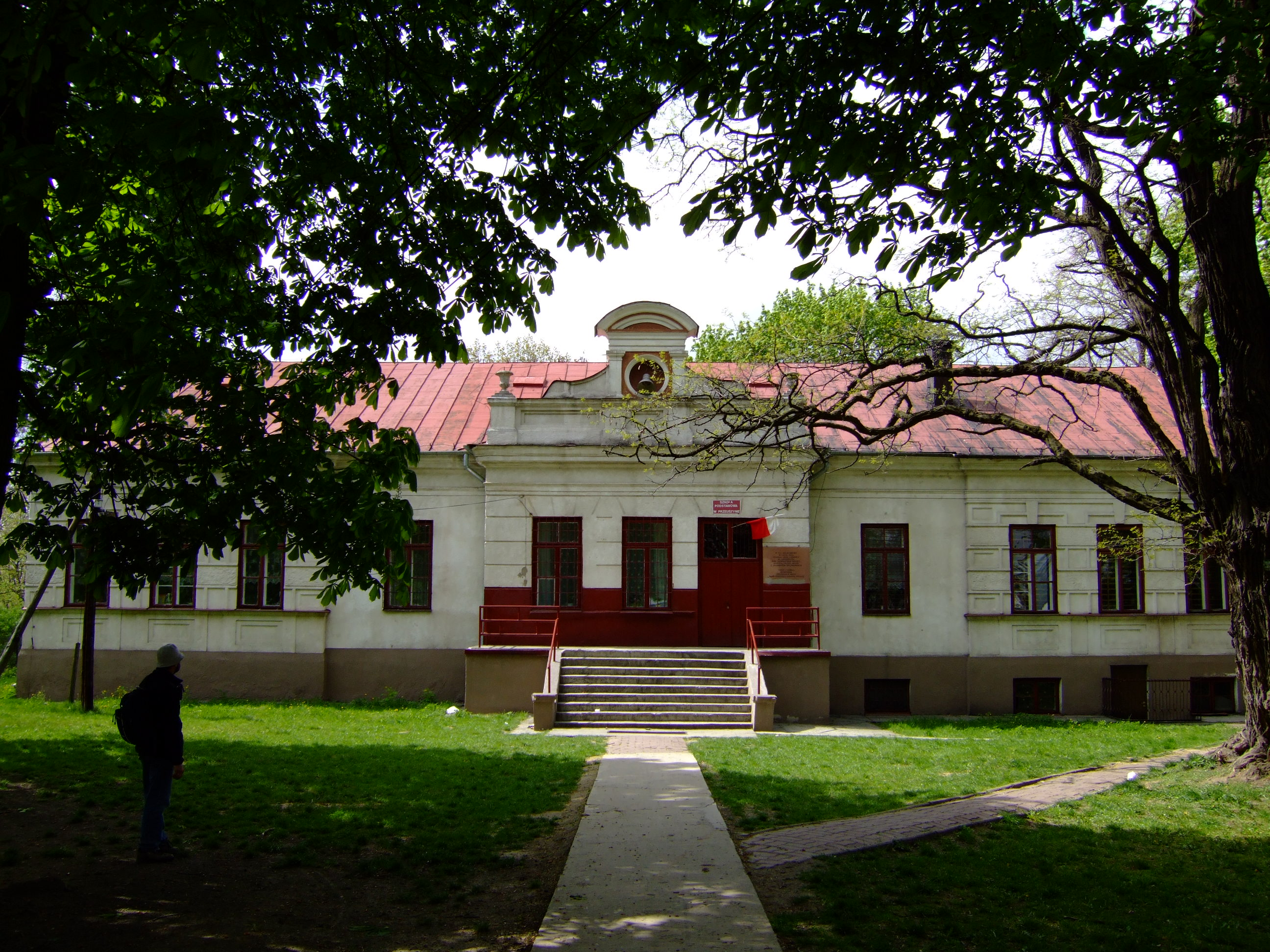
- Manor

- Location within Poland
- Coordinates: 50°49′58″N 21°30′16″E
- Country: Poland
- Voivodeship: Świętokrzyskie
- County: Ostrowiec
- Gmina: Ćmielów
- Population: 270

Przeuszyn [pʂɛˈuʂɨn] is a village in the administrative district of Gmina Ćmielów, within Ostrowiec County, Świętokrzyskie Voivodeship, in south-central Poland. It lies approximately 7 km (4 mi) south of Ćmielów, 14 km (9 mi) south-east of Ostrowiec Świętokrzyski, and 63 km (39 mi) east of the regional capital Kielce.
