= Brzóstowa =

- Village
- Location within Poland
- Coordinates: 50°53′34″N 21°29′8″E
- Country: Poland
- Voivodeship: Świętokrzyskie
- County: Ostrowiec
- Gmina: Ćmielów
- Population: 720

Brzóstowa [bʐusˈtɔva] is a village in the administrative district of Gmina Ćmielów, within Ostrowiec County, Świętokrzyskie Voivodeship, in south-central Poland. It lies approximately 3 km (2 mi) west of Ćmielów, 8 km (5 mi) south-east of Ostrowiec Świętokrzyski, and 62 km (39 mi) east of the regional capital Kielce.
