= Viktorin =

Viktorin is both a surname and a given name. Notable people with the name include:

- Alison Viktorin (born 1981), American actress and voice actress
- Viktorin Hallmayer (1831–1872), Austrian composer and band conductor
- Viktorin Kornel of Všehrdy (1460-1520), Czech humanist and lawyer
- Viktorin Molchanov (1886–1975), Russian general and anti-communist

== See also ==
- Wiktoryn (disambiguation)
