= Stare Stoki =

- Village
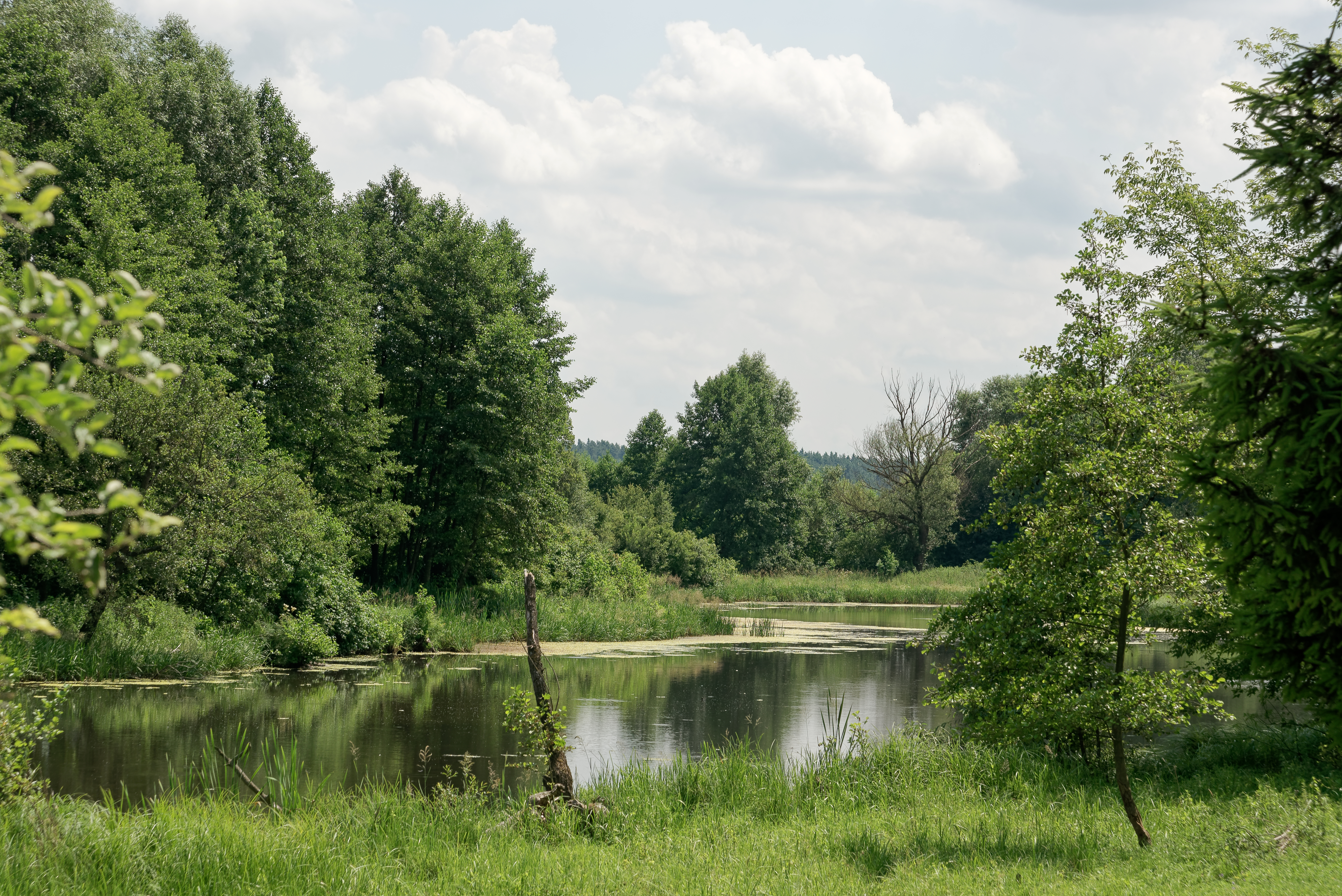

- Location within Poland
- Coordinates: 50°57′25″N 21°32′58″E
- Country: Poland
- Voivodeship: Świętokrzyskie
- County: Ostrowiec
- Gmina: Ćmielów
- Population: 100

Stare Stoki [ˈstarɛ ˈstɔki] is a village in the administrative district of Gmina Ćmielów, within Ostrowiec County, Świętokrzyskie Voivodeship, in south-central Poland. It lies approximately 8 km (5 mi) north of Ćmielów, 11 km (7 mi) east of Ostrowiec Świętokrzyski, and 66 km (41 mi) east of the regional capital Kielce.
