= Bażantarnia, Podkarpackie Voivodeship =

Bażantarnia
- Village
- Location within Poland
- Coordinates: 49°50′18″N 22°45′36″E
- Country: Poland
- Voivodeship: Subcarpathian
- County: Przemyśl
- Gmina: Żurawica

Bażantarnia [baʐanˈtarɲa] is a village in the administrative district of Gmina Żurawica, within Przemyśl County, Subcarpathian Voivodeship, in south-eastern Poland.
