= Gmina Ćmielów =

Gmina Ćmielów Ćmielów Commune
- Gmina
- Coat of arms
- Interactive map of Gmina Ćmielów
- Coordinates (Ćmielów): 50°53′25″N 21°30′53″E
- Country: Poland
- Voivodeship: Świętokrzyskie
- County: Ostrowiec
- Seat: Ćmielów

Area
  - Total: 117.7 km^{2} (45.4 sq mi)

Population (2006)
  - Total: 7,839
  - Density: 66.60/km^{2} (172.5/sq mi)
  - Urban: 3,172
  - Rural: 4,667
- Website: http://www.cmielow.pl

Gmina Ćmielów is an urban-rural gmina (administrative district) in Ostrowiec County, Świętokrzyskie Voivodeship, in south-central Poland. Its seat is the town of Ćmielów, which lies approximately 10 kilometres (6 mi) south-east of Ostrowiec Świętokrzyski and 64 km (40 mi) east of the regional capital Kielce.

The gmina covers an area of 117.7 square kilometres (45.4 sq mi), and as of 2006 its total population is 7,839 (out of which the population of Ćmielów amounts to 3,172, and the population of the rural part of the gmina is 4,667).

== Villages ==
Apart from the town of Ćmielów, Gmina Ćmielów contains the villages and settlements of Boria, Borownia, Brzóstowa, Buszkowice, Czarna Glina, Drzenkowice, Glinka, Grójec, Jastków, Krzczonowice, Łysowody, Piaski Brzóstowskie, Podgórze, Podgrodzie, Przeuszyn, Ruda Kościelna, Stare Stoki, Stoki Duże, Stoki Małe, Trębanów, Wiktoryn, Wojnowice, Wola Grójecka and Wólka Wojnowska.

== Neighbouring gminas ==
Gmina Ćmielów is bordered by the gminas of Bałtów, Bodzechów, Opatów, Ożarów, Sadowie, Tarłów and Wojciechowice.
