= Franciszek and Magdalena Banasiewicz =

Righteous among the Nations recipients

The family of Franciszek and Magdalena Banasiewicz and their children Jerzy, Tadeusz, Antoni, and Maria lived on a farm in Orzechowce near Przemyśl during the Nazi German occupation of Poland in World War II. In July 1991 they were bestowed the titles of Righteous among the Nations by Yad Vashem for rescuing fifteen Jews escaping the Holocaust from the ghetto in Przemyśl.

== Background ==
Franciszek Banasiewicz (2 April 1884 – 5 February 1954) was a decorative painter before the war. His wife Magdalena née Lenar (7 July 1884 – 28 September 1957) was a homemaker. Two of their sons, Antoni and Tadeusz, were sent by the Nazi Germans to forced labour in the Third Reich when the war broke out. Tadeusz escaped, and after returning home hid in barns and in the fields. His father, Franciszek, organised many heroic rescue missions with his aid.

Initially, Franciszek Banasiewicz was approached by Salomon Ehrenfreud, who escaped the ghetto massacre of June 1942 having witnessed the death of his wife and children. He was hiding at the home of Jan Kościak a bit earlier. Tadeusz, hiding, took it upon himself to hide along with Salomon around the farm. Meanwhile, Franciszek started taking in other Jews including Salomon's brother, Izaak, also helped by other Poles, his cousin Jakub Nassan and their friends Marcel Teich and Junek Frenkiel. Helped by his own son, Franciszek brought from the ghetto Nassan's wife, Eugenia and her friend Fejga Weidenbaum. A week later he rescued Edmund Orner.

== The bunker ==
The Banasiewicz family and the fugitives began constructing a bunker under the house in autumn of 1943, in preparation for the cold Polish winter. The new hiding area enabled the Banasiewiczs to rescue more people. In October 1943, on request of Salomon Ehrenfreud, Tadeusz smuggled out Bunia Stamhofer and Fela Szattner from the ghetto. In January 1944, he rescued Samuel Reinharz with his brother Beniamin and their mother Bertha. He attempted to rescue Jozef Weindling, however, Jozef's brother, a ghetto policeman, arrested Tadeusz at that time, and passed him over to the Nazis. The German commander released him nonetheless, bribed by Samuel Reinharz, who then escaped with Tadeusz and Jozef back to the farm where all fifteen Jews were hiding.

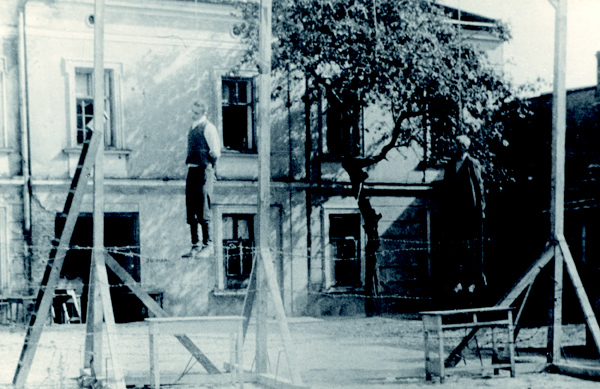
Public execution of Michał Kruk in Przemyśl

Maria Banasiewicz recalls how shocked though undeterred they were to learn that, in the nearby village of Tarnawce, farmer Kurpiel who sheltered 27 Jews in a bunker similar to theirs was discovered in May 1944. All fugitives were murdered. Kurpiel with his wife and family was executed in Lipowica. Several months earlier, a similar fate met Banasiewiczs liaison with the Ghetto, Michał Kruk. He was executed on 6 September 1943, during the first public execution in Przemyśl, along with several other people punished by death for the assistance they had rendered to the Jews.

In Przemyśl: 15,210 Jews lost their lives during the Holocaust, including 568 non-Jewish Poles killed because they were attempting to save them. Only 675 Jews remained, among them 415 Jews saved directly in the town including 60 children. — Leszek M. Włodek

In May 1944 German gendarmes came to recapture one of the Banasiewicz sons. They surrounded the house, but were unsuccessful. The bunker was not discovered either. The Red Army retook the town from German forces on 27 July 1944. All family members and Jewish escapees survived. In 1988 (or on 17 July 1991, sources vary) the Banasiewicz family including Franciszek, Magdalena, Maria, Tadeusz and Jerzy were given the titles of Righteous among the Nations for their heroic stance against the Nazi German Holocaust.

== Notes and references ==
- Władysław Bartoszewski, Zofia Lewin, Righteous Among Nations Earlscourt Publications Ltd., 1969 Page 780
- Commission for the Investigation of Crimes against the Polish Nation (Główna Komisja Badania Zbrodni Hitlerowskich w Polsce) Instytut Pamięci Narodowej, Those who Helped: Polish Rescuers of Jews During the Holocaust Page 94. Published by Mako, 1993, ISBN 83-900573-6-0, 145 pages, Biblioteka Narodowa (Poland), Instytut Bibliograficzny, 1984
- Władysław Bartoszewski, Zofia Lewinówna, The Samaritans: Heroes of the Holocaust Published by Twayne Publishers, 1970, 442 pages
- Władysław Bartoszewski, The Blood Shed Unites Us: Pages from the History of Help to the Jews Page 213 — 1970 — 243 pages
- Muzeum Niepodległości w Warszawie, Rada Ochrony Pamięci Walk i Męczeństwa (Poland) (1939–1945), Polskie państwo podziemne wobec tragedii Żydów 1939 – 1945. Page 24, 1993 – 82 pages. See, 1988: BANASIEWICZ Franciszek, Magdalena i dzieci: Maria, Tadeusz, Jerzy.
- Franciszek and Magdalena Banasiewicz – their activity to save Jews' lives during the Holocaust, at Yad Vashem website
