= Wiktoryn =

Wiktoryn may refer to the following places:

- Wiktoryn, Kuyavian-Pomeranian Voivodeship (north-central Poland)
- Wiktoryn, Pułtusk County, in Masovian Voivodeship (east-central Poland)
- Wiktoryn, Warsaw, in Masovian Voivodeship (east-central Poland)
- Wiktoryn, Świętokrzyskie Voivodeship (south-central Poland)
