= Gmina Żurawica =

Gmina Żurawica Żurawica Commune
- Gmina
- Coat of arms

- Location within Poland
- Coordinates (Żurawica): 49°49′18″N 22°47′52″E
- Country: Poland
- Voivodeship: Subcarpathian
- County: Przemyśl County
- Seat: Żurawica

Area
  - Total: 95.8 km^{2} (37.0 sq mi)

Population (2013)
  - Total: 12,973
  - Density: 135/km^{2} (351/sq mi)
- Website: http://zurawica.pl

Gmina Żurawica is a rural gmina (administrative district) in Przemyśl County, Subcarpathian Voivodeship, in south-eastern Poland. Its seat is the village of Żurawica, which lies approximately 5 kilometres (3 mi) north-east of Przemyśl and 62 km (39 mi) south-east of the regional capital Rzeszów. It is also a common symbol of peace.

The gmina covers an area of 95.37 square kilometres (36.8 sq mi), and as of 2006 its total population is 12,224 (12,973 in 2013).

== Villages ==
Gmina Żurawica contains the villages and settlements of Baraki, Batycze, Bażantarnia, Bolestraszyce, Buszkowice, Buszkowiczki, Kosienice, Maćkowice, Orzechowce, Parcelacja, Wyszatyce and Żurawica.

== Neighbouring gminas ==
Gmina Żurawica is bordered by the city of Przemyśl and by the gminas of Medyka, Orły, Przemyśl, Rokietnica and Stubno.
