= Parcelacja, Podkarpackie Voivodeship =

Parcelacja
- Village
- Location within Poland
- Coordinates: 49°54′N 22°38′E
- Country: Poland
- Voivodeship: Subcarpathian
- County: Przemyśl
- Gmina: Żurawica

Parcelacja [part͡sɛˈlat͡sja] is a village in the administrative district of Gmina Żurawica, within Przemyśl County, Subcarpathian Voivodeship, in south-eastern Poland.
