= Bolestraszyce =

- Village
- Location within Poland
- Coordinates: 49°48′41″N 22°50′29″E
- Country: Poland
- Voivodeship: Subcarpathian
- County: Przemyśl
- Gmina: Żurawica
- Population: 1,700

Bolestraszyce [bɔlɛstraˈʂɨt͡sɛ] is a village in the administrative district of Gmina Żurawica, within Przemyśl County, Subcarpathian Voivodeship, in south-eastern Poland.

Nearby is the Bolestraszyce Arboretum.
