= Podgrodzie, Świętokrzyskie Voivodeship =

Podgrodzie
- Village
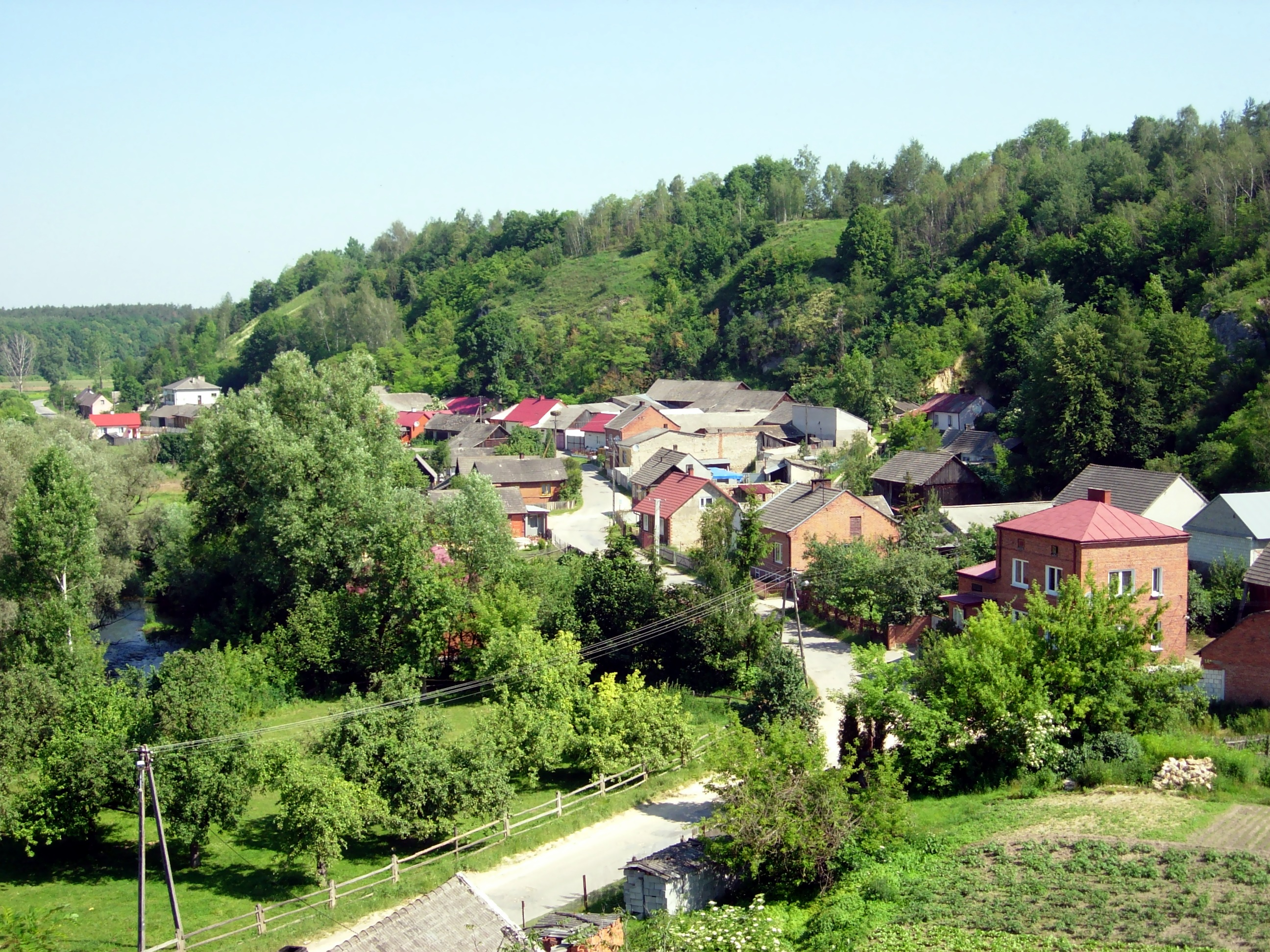

- Location within Poland
- Coordinates: 50°54′20″N 21°32′42″E
- Country: Poland
- Voivodeship: Świętokrzyskie
- County: Ostrowiec
- Gmina: Ćmielów

Podgrodzie [pɔdˈɡrɔd͡ʑɛ] is a village in the administrative district of Gmina Ćmielów, within Ostrowiec County, Świętokrzyskie Voivodeship, in south-central Poland. It lies approximately 3 km (2 mi) north-east of Ćmielów, 11 km (7 mi) east of Ostrowiec Świętokrzyski, and 66 km (41 mi) east of the regional capital Kielce.
