= Wiktoryn, Świętokrzyskie Voivodeship =

Wiktoryn
- Village
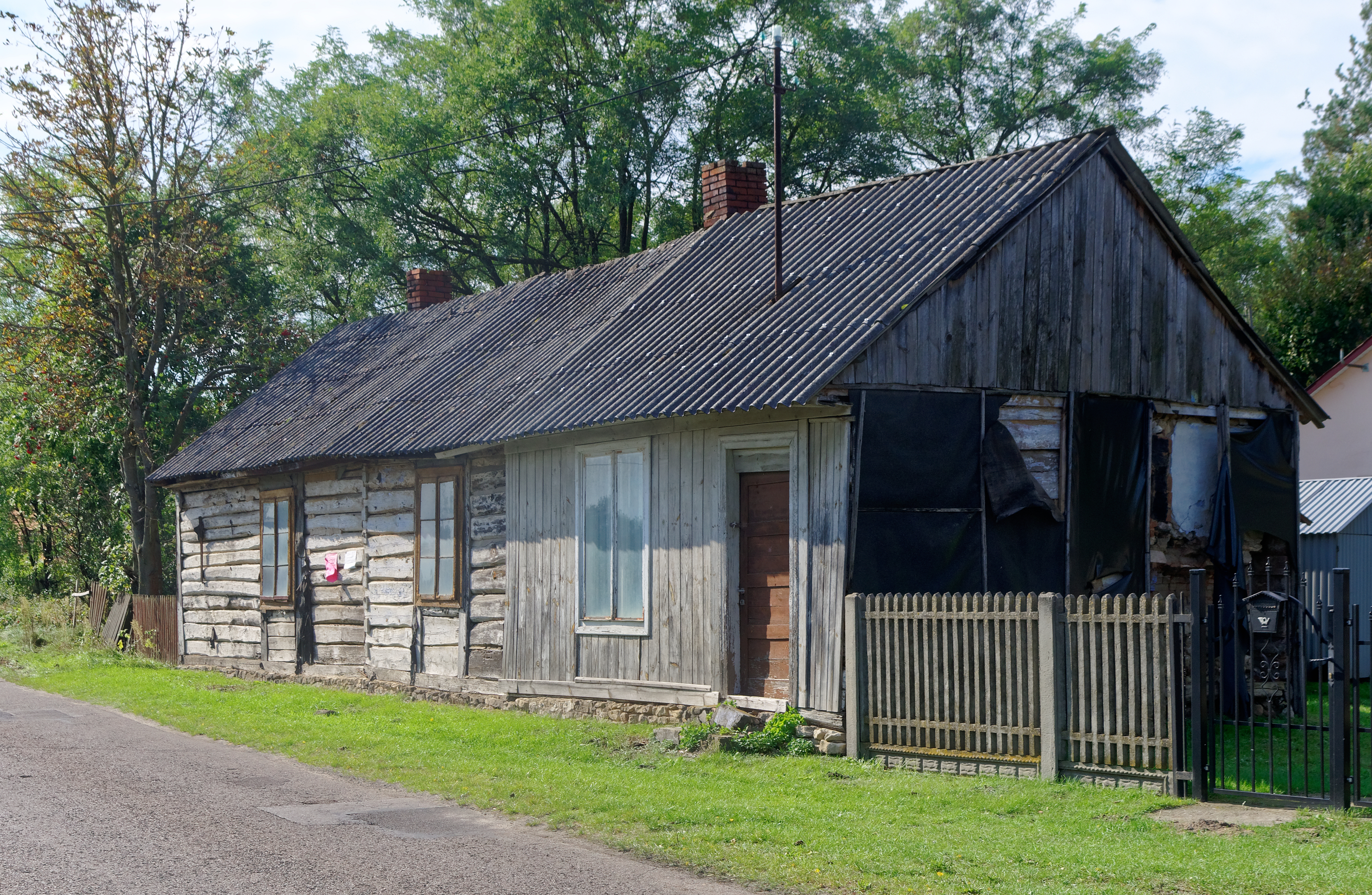

- Location within Poland
- Coordinates: 50°58′4″N 21°35′1″E
- Country: Poland
- Voivodeship: Świętokrzyskie
- County: Ostrowiec
- Gmina: Ćmielów
- Population: 90

Wiktoryn [vikˈtɔrɨn] is a village in the administrative district of Gmina Ćmielów, within Ostrowiec County, Świętokrzyskie Voivodeship, in south-central Poland. It lies approximately 10 km (6 mi) north-east of Ćmielów, 14 km (9 mi) east of Ostrowiec Świętokrzyski, and 69 km (43 mi) east of the regional capital Kielce.
