= Orzechowce, Podkarpackie Voivodeship =

Orzechowce
- Village
- Interactive map of Orzechowce
- Location within Poland
- Coordinates: 49°52′N 22°47′E
- Country: Poland
- Voivodeship: Subcarpathian
- County: Przemyśl
- Gmina: Żurawica

Orzechowce [ɔʐɛˈxɔft͡sɛ] is a village in the administrative district of Gmina Żurawica, within Przemyśl County, Subcarpathian Voivodeship, in south-eastern Poland.

== Notable people ==
- Franciszek and Magdalena Banasiewicz with children, Polish Righteous among the Nations
