= Wyszatyce =

- Village
- Location within Poland
- Coordinates: 49°51′N 22°53′E
- Country: Poland
- Voivodeship: Subcarpathian
- County: Przemyśl
- Gmina: Żurawica

Wyszatyce [vɨʂaˈtɨt͡sɛ] is a village in the administrative district of Gmina Żurawica, within Przemyśl County, Subcarpathian Voivodeship, in south-eastern Poland.
