= Batycze =

- Village
- Location within Poland
- Coordinates: 49°52′N 22°45′E
- Country: Poland
- Voivodeship: Subcarpathian
- County: Przemyśl
- Gmina: Żurawica
- Elevation: 249 m (817 ft)

Batycze [baˈtɨt͡ʂɛ] is a village in the administrative district of Gmina Żurawica, within Przemyśl County, Subcarpathian Voivodeship, in south-eastern Poland.
