= Buszkowice, Świętokrzyskie Voivodeship =

Buszkowice
- Village
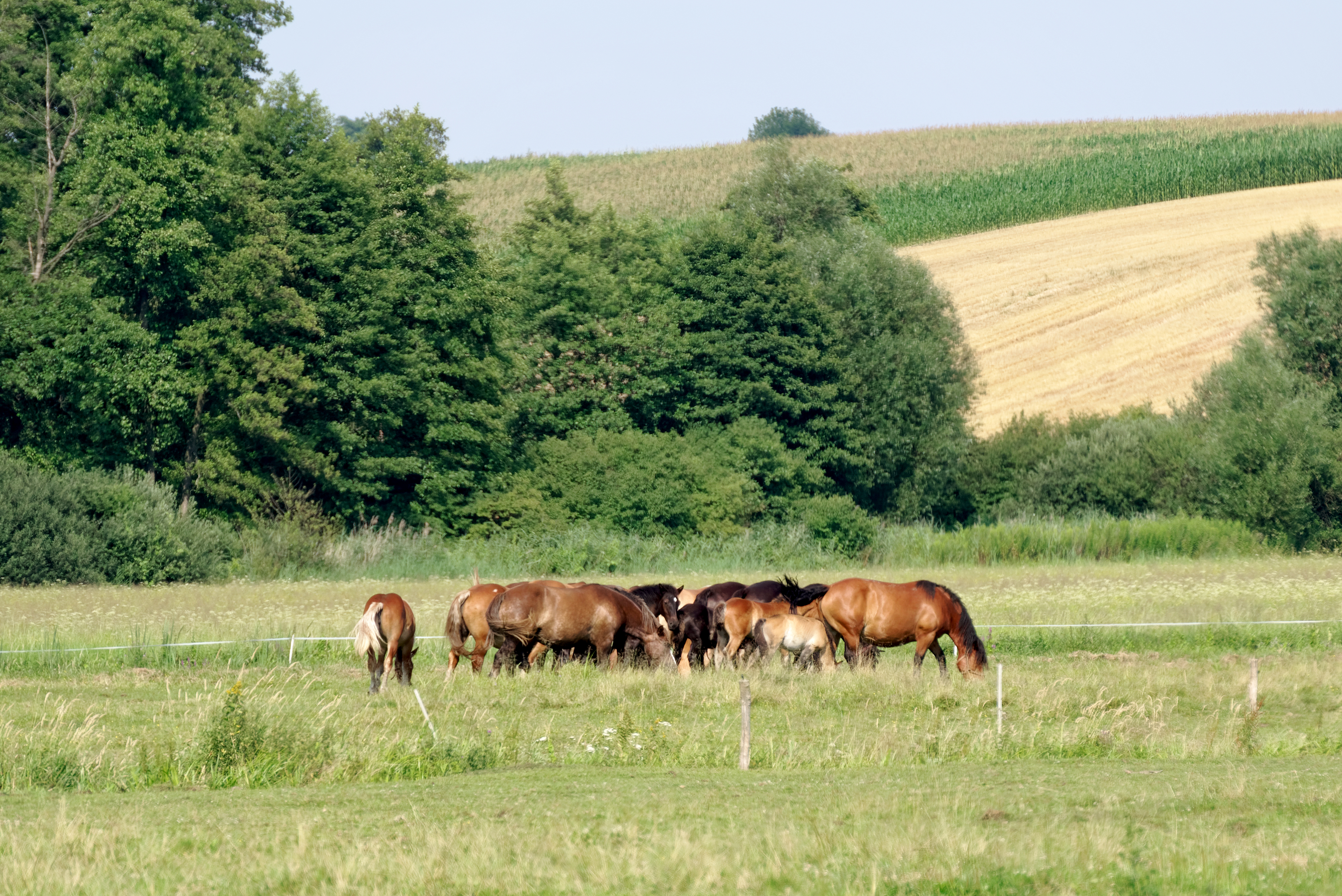

- Location within Poland
- Coordinates: 50°51′23″N 21°31′58″E
- Country: Poland
- Voivodeship: Świętokrzyskie
- County: Ostrowiec
- Gmina: Ćmielów
- Population: 220

Buszkowice [buʂkɔˈvit͡sɛ] is a village in the administrative district of Gmina Ćmielów, within Ostrowiec County, Świętokrzyskie Voivodeship, in south-central Poland. It lies approximately 4 km (2 mi) south of Ćmielów, 13 km (8 mi) south-east of Ostrowiec Świętokrzyski, and 65 km (40 mi) east of the regional capital Kielce.
