= Buszkowiczki =

- Village
- Location within Poland
- Coordinates: 49°49′N 22°49′E
- Country: Poland
- Voivodeship: Subcarpathian
- County: Przemyśl
- Gmina: Żurawica

Buszkowiczki [buʂkɔˈvit͡ʂki] is a village in the administrative district of Gmina Żurawica, within Przemyśl County, Subcarpathian Voivodeship, in south-eastern Poland.
