= Żurawica =

- Village
- Interactive map of Żurawica
- Location within Poland
- Coordinates: 49°49′18″N 22°47′52″E
- Country: Poland
- Voivodeship: Subcarpathian
- County: Przemyśl
- Gmina: Żurawica
- Population: 4,702
- Website: http://www.zurawica.pl

Żurawica [ʐuraˈvit͡sa] is a village in Przemyśl County, Subcarpathian Voivodeship, in south-eastern Poland. It is the seat of the gmina (administrative district) called Gmina Żurawica.

In 2006 the village had a population of 4,702.
