= Kosienice =

- Village
- Location within Poland
- Coordinates: 49°52′N 22°42′E
- Country: Poland
- Voivodeship: Subcarpathian
- County: Przemyśl
- Gmina: Żurawica

Not to be confused with Kozienice.

Kosienice [kɔɕɛˈnit͡sɛ] is a village in the administrative district of Gmina Żurawica, within Przemyśl County, Subcarpathian Voivodeship, in south-eastern Poland.
