= Stefan Turchak =

Soviet conductor (1938–1988)

Stefan Turchak Стефан Турчак
- Also known as: Stepan Turchak
- Born: February 28, 1938; Maćkowice, Second Polish Republic
- Died: October 23, 1988 (aged 50) Kiev, Ukrainian SSR, Soviet Union
- Genres: Classical
- Occupations: Conductor; Teacher

Stefan Vasylovych Turchak (Note: Ukrainian: Стефан Васильович Турчак, romanized: Stefan Vasylovych Turchak; Russian: Стефан Васильевич Турчак, romanized: Stefan Vasilyevich Turchak; Polish: Stefan Wasylowicz Turczak) (February 28, 1938 – October 23, 1988, sometimes given as Stepan) (Note: Ukrainian: Степан, romanized: Stepan; Russian: Степан, romanized: Stepan) was an outstanding Ukrainian conductor, People's Artist of the USSR (1977) and a Laureate of the Shevchenko National Prize.

== Biography ==
Stefan Turchak was born in the village of Maćkowice, which is now Subcarpathian Voivodeship in Poland. He grew up in Dubliany.

In 1955, Stefan graduated from Filaret Kolessa Lviv Music and Pedagogical School. After that, he worked as a teacher of music and sang at the Sokal Pedagogical School. Then he organized a choir, which became famous in Sokal region for its performance of folk songs, and the girls' ensemble, which in 1957 even performed on the Kyiv stage.

From 1957 Turchak studied at Lviv Conservatory (conducting class of Mykola Kolessa), which he successfully finished in 1962.

Between 1960 and 1962 he was a conductor of the Solomiya Krushelnytska Lviv State Academic Theatre of Opera and Ballet.

From 1963 to 1966 and 1973 to 1977 he was a chief conductor of the National Symphony Orchestra of the Ukrainian SSR, from 1967 to 1973 and from 1977 - of the Kyiv Opera and Ballet Theater.

Since 1966 Stefan Turchak was head of the symphony orchestra and head of the Department of Opera and Symphony Conducting of the Kyiv Conservatory (since 1973 - Associate Professor).

He lived in Kyiv and died on October 23, 1988. Stefan Turchak was buried in Baikove Cemetery. The author of his tombstone was the sculptor Valentyn Znoba.

== Repertoire ==
Works of classical and modern music prevailed in the extensive repertoire of S. Turchak. He also paid special attention to both symphonic and operatic works of such Ukrainian composers as Levko Revutsky, Borys Lyatoshynsky, Heorhiy Maiboroda, Andriy Shtoharenko and toured abroad.

Turchak was the first director of such operas:

"Zahybel eskadry [Destruction of the Squadron]" (1967), "Mamai" (1970) by Vitaliy Hubarenko;

"Yaroslav Mudryj [Yaroslav the Wise]" by Heorhiy Maiboroda (1975);

"Praporonosci [Flag-bearers]" by Oleksandr Bilash (1985).

and ballets:

Vitaliy Hubarenko's "Kaminnyi hospodar" (1969);

"Olha" (1982) and "Prometej [Prometheus]" (1986) by Yevhen Stankovych.

== Awards ==
In 1973, Turchak was awarded the Z. P. Paliashvili State Prize of the Georgian SSR. Later on he also received such rewards as the People's Artist of USSR (1977), Honored Artist and the Order of the Red Banner of Labor.

In 1980, he was awarded the Shevchenko National Prize for his remarkable performing skills.

== Family ==
Turchak's wife, Hisela Tsypola, was an opera singer (soprano) and soloist of the National Opera of Ukraine.

== Legacy ==
Since 1994, the Stepan Turchak National Competition of Conductors has been held in Kyiv every 4 years. Since 2006 this competition is held at the international level.

There are also children's art schools in Kyiv and Dublyany, named after Stepan Turchak.
