= Buszkowice, Podkarpackie Voivodeship =

Buszkowice
- Village
- Location within Poland
- Coordinates: 49°48′12″N 22°48′12″E
- Country: Poland
- Voivodeship: Subcarpathian
- County: Przemyśl
- Gmina: Żurawica
- Population: 830

Buszkowice [buʂkɔˈvit͡sɛ] is a village in the administrative district of Gmina Żurawica, within Przemyśl County, Subcarpathian Voivodeship, in south-eastern Poland.
