= Józef Szewczyk =

Polish footballer

Personal information
- Date of birth: 17 February 1950
- Place of birth: Turów, Poland
- Date of death: 19 May 1989 (aged 39)
- Place of death: Poznań, Poland
- Height: 1.84 m (6 ft 0 in)
- Position: Midfielder

Youth career
- 1962–1966: Wanda Nowa Huta

Senior career*
Years	Team	Apps	(Gls)
1966–1969	Hutnik Nowa Huta		
1969–1972	Śląsk Wrocław		
1972–1974	Hutnik Nowa Huta		
1974–1984	Lech Poznań	248	(14)

International career
1978	Poland	1	(0)
- * Club domestic league appearances and goals

Józef Szewczyk (17 February 1950 – 19 May 1989) was a Polish professional footballer who played as a midfielder.

== Honours ==
Lech Poznań

- Ekstraklasa: 1982–83, 1983–84
- Polish Cup: 1981–82
