= Lubomir Tomaszewski =

American painter

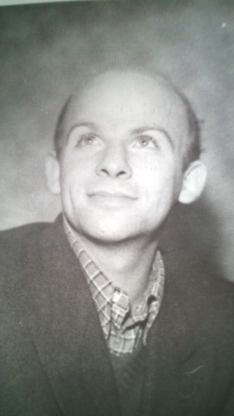
- Born: Lubomir Wojciech Tomaszewski; June 9, 1923; Warsaw, Second Polish Republic
- Died: November 15, 2018 (aged 95); Easton, Connecticut, United States
- Known for: Painting, contemporary art, sculpture
- Website: lubomirtomaszewski.com

Lubomir Wojciech Tomaszewski (June 9, 1923 – November 15, 2018) was a Polish-American painter, sculptor and designer born in Warsaw, Poland. He lived in the United States from 1966 onwards.

== Biography ==
The son of Lubomir and Lucyna née Bartłomiejczyk, he was an alumnus of the Warsaw Academy of Fine Arts, and a student of the Warsaw University of Technology. In 1966 he emigrated to New York City in the United States. In the 1970s, he moved to Easton, Connecticut where he lived until his death in 2018.

He fought as a soldier of the Polish Home Army through all 63 days of the Warsaw Uprising. He was a commander of anti-tank unit. He witnessed the death of his younger brother and of many friends.

Tomaszewski started his artistic work in the 1950s at the Institute of Industrial Design in Warsaw, an innovative institution which aimed to create modern living in post-war Poland. He cooperated with designers like Henryk Jędrasiak, Mieczysław Naruszewicz and Hanna Orthwein. He created popular porcelain figurines and "Ina" and "Dorota" coffee sets, which were exhibited at the International Exhibition of the Board of the Industrial Designers’ Association (ICSID) in Paris in 1963.

In 1994, he established an international art movement called Emotionalism, together with a group of painters, sculptors, photographers and even dancers and musicians. He started creating his unique fire and smoke paintings. His sculptures were recognized by The New York Times in 1975:

"The most effective among the pieces are the animals or birds that convey the state of tension or movement or brute strength, something that struggles against gravity to maintain its force."

Tomaszewski took part in over 150 individual and group exhibitions around the world. His works are in renowned museum and private art collections of, among others: National Museum in Warsaw, National Museum in Cracow, Warsaw Uprising Museum, Hale Museum in Germany, Robert Marston, Rockefeller family and Jimmy Carter.

In 2021 the first Biography about Lubomir Tomaszewski was published in Agora Publish House book wrote by Katarzyna Rij and Jerzy A. Wlazło.

== Awards ==
- 1955 – First prize for sculpture in surrounding of the Palace of Culture and Science in Warsaw
- 1964 – Golden Cross for accomplishments in industrial design, Poland
- 1984 – Award for Achievement in Sculpture, Perspective Magazine, USA
- 1991 – Best in Show O.A.F., Bruce Museum, USA
- 2005 – First reward for sculpture ‘Spectrum’, New Canaan Society for the Arts, USA
- 2006 – People's Choice Award, National Sculpture Society, New York
- 2008 – First Award for a sculpture ‘Mythical Giant’, New Canaan Society for the Arts, USA
- 2010 – American Society of Contemporary Artists, New York, award for sculpture ‘Joy of Dance’
- 2011 – Second prize for sculpture ‘Illusion’, New Canaan Society for the Arts, USA
- 2013 – First prize for the sculpture ‘Flight above the Stage’ od New Canaan Society for the Arts
- 2014 – First prize for ‘Music of the Forest’ from New Canaan Society for the Arts, USA
- 2014 – ‘Lifetime Achievement Award’, University of Bridgeport
- 2014 – Award for ‘Merit in Inventiveness’
- 2014 – Gold Medal ‘Gloria Artis’
- 2016 – ‘Outstanding Pole’
- 2017 – Medal ‘Ignacy Paderewski Arts and Music Award’ USA

== Exhibitions ==
- 1964 – Sculpture, ceramics and glass of Lubomir Tomaszewski, Kordegarda, Warszawa.
- 1969 – Rye, New York.
- 1970 – Lubomir Tomaszewski, Sculpture 1967–1970.
- 1971 – The in Cellar Gallery, New York.
- 1972 – Altman Craft Gallery, New York.
- 1974 – Audubon Society of Connecticut, Fairfield, Connecticut.
- 1975 – Women's National Republican Club, New York.
- 1978–84 – annually Margot Gallery, New York.
- 1981–88 – annually Old Warsaw Gallery, Alexandria, Virginia, USA.
- 1986 – "Tomaszewski Painter and Sculptor", Morin-Miller Galleries, New York.
- 1988 – Nippon Club, New York.
- 1988 – "Lubomir Tomaszewski, Sculpture", Polish American Artists Society, New York.
- 1989 – "Inspirations from Nature, Robert Baranet, paintings – Lubomir Tomaszewski, sculpture". The Carriage Barn Arts Center, Waveny Park, New Canaan, Connecticut, USA (New Canaan Society for the Arts).
- 1989 – "Lighting and Sculpture, featuring new works by Lubomir Tomaszewski", Lighting Services INC., IDCNY Center Two, Long Island City, New York.
- 1989 – An Exhibition of Large Scale Outdoor Surrealistic Sculpture, New England Center for Contemporary Art (NECCA), Brooklyn, Connecticut, USA.
- 1989 – Images Gallery, Norwalk, Connecticut, USA.
- 1990 – „Tomaszewski inspired by Nature", The Carlson Gallery, Bernhard Center, University of Bridgeport, USA.
- 1990 – 2001 permanent exhibition Museum NECCA (New England Center for Contemporary Art), Brooklyn, Connecticut, USA.
- 1991 – An exhibition of large scale outdoor sculpture by Lubomir Tomaszewski, Museum NECCA, Brooklyn, Connecticut, USA.
- 1993 – "Sculpture inspired by nature by Lubomir Tomaszewski", Skulski Art Gallery, Polish Cultural Foundation, Clark, New Jersey, USA.
- 1994 – Meet the artist, Lubomir Tomaszewski, Reccini Studio Gallery, Hudson Valley, New York.
- 1995 – "Lubomir Tomaszewski" Polish Art Gallery Nowy Dziennik, New York.
- 1995 – "Large Scale Dramatic Sculptures, In tune with nature", Fordham University at Lincoln Center, New York.
- 1996 – "In Tune with Nature", Polski Instytut Naukowy, New York.
- 1996 – "Drama in Painting and Sculpture “In Tune with Nature" by Tomaszewski", Consulate General of the Republic of Poland, New York.
- 1997 – Madeline Novotzky, Lubomir Tomaszewski, Jozefa Tomaszewski, Blue Hill Plaza, Pearl River NY.
- 1997 – Exhibition Tomaszewski and the Theatre of the Intuitive Improvisation – music by Medyna, Douglas Poger, Stephen Boisvert, Harvard University at Gutman Library, Cambridge, Massachusetts, USA.
- 1997 –" Lubomir Tomaszewski – Natural art sculptures and burnished paintings", L’Atelier Gallery, Piermont, New York.
- 1998 – "Emotionalism. An exhibition sculptures and paintings by Lubomir Tomaszewski", Easton Public Library, Easton, Connecticut, USA.
- 1998 – "Awakening : Contemporary art of Vietnam, Gallery 4. Lubomir Tomaszewski", New London Art Society Gallery, New London, Connecticut, USA.
- 1999 – Alexandra Nowak i Lubomir Tomaszewski, Polish Institute of Art and Science of America.
- 2000 – "Watercolors by Rhoda Madan-Shotkin, sculpture by Lubomir Tomaszewski", Unique Gallery.
- 2000 – "Two men – two imaginations, Guenther Riess and Lubomir Tomaszewski", Images Sculptural Concepts, South Norwalk, Connecticut, USA.
- 2000 – Gregory Jakubowski painting, Lubomir Tomaszewski sculpture, Gutman Library Harvard University Cambridge.
- 2000 – Response to Emotionalism, Walsh Library Gallery, Seton Holl University New Jersey.
- 2002 – Warsaw Uprising Painted with Fire, PolisAcademy of Science, Warsaw, Poland.
- 2002 – Lubomir Tomaszewski and Gregory Jakubowski, Europa Club, Brooklyn, New York.
- 2003 – Musique et Emotions Plastique. Gregory Jakubowski, Lubomir Tomaszewski, Ars France.
- 2003 – Rao Gallery, Hellertown, New York.
- 2004 – Greenwich, Connecticut.
- 2005 – ARTredSPOT Gallery, Fairfield, Connecticut.
- 2005 – Kurier Plus, New York.
- 2005 – Warsaw Uprising Museum, Warsaw.
- 2006 – Easton, Connecticut.
- 2008 – Kurier Plus, New York.
- 2009 – Skulski Art Gallery, Clark, New Jersey.
- 2011 – PIASA, New York.
- 2011 – TransForm Gallery, New Rochelle, New York.
- 2012 – Galerie Roi Doré „TRANSFORMATIONS- works on paper (2011–2012), Los Angeles, Paryż.
- 2009, 2010, 2011, 2012 – Lana Santorelli Gallery, New York.
- 2013 – Design Institute, Kielce, Poland.
- 2014 – „Emotions by Lubomir Tomaszewski", Palace of Nations ONZ, Geneva, Switzerland.
- 2014 – „Art in Residence" Berno, Switzerland.
- 2015 – " My Art is my Confession to People, Van Rij Gallery, Ćmielow, Poland.
- 2015 – "KunstGalerie" Bachlechner Galerie, Zurich, Switzerland.
- 2015 – „New York. Paris. Warsaw – Cities of Lubomir Tomaszewski, The Grand Theatre – National Opera, Warsaw.
- 2016 – ArtCheval, France.
- 2016 – Conférence ( Conferce )à plusieurs voix : Lubomir Tomaszewski ou la création par le feu et la fumée. Château de Ripaille – Thonon-les-Bains, France.
- 2016– 2017 – "At first there was war… Then affirmation of life" Van Rij Gallery, Ćmielów, Poland.
- 2017–2018 – Permanent presentation in Brussel in the Permanent Representation of the Republic of Poland to the European Union.
- 2017 – "Lubomir Tomaszewski. Sculptures. Paintings. Design", International Cultural Centre, Krakow, Poland.
- 2018 – "Porcelain Sculpture. Lubomir Tomaszewski" Polish Institute in Bratislava, Slovakia.

2019 – Art and Natur, Van Rij Gallery, Poland

2022 – Van Rij Gallery, solo show, Krakow, Poland
