= Ćmielów =

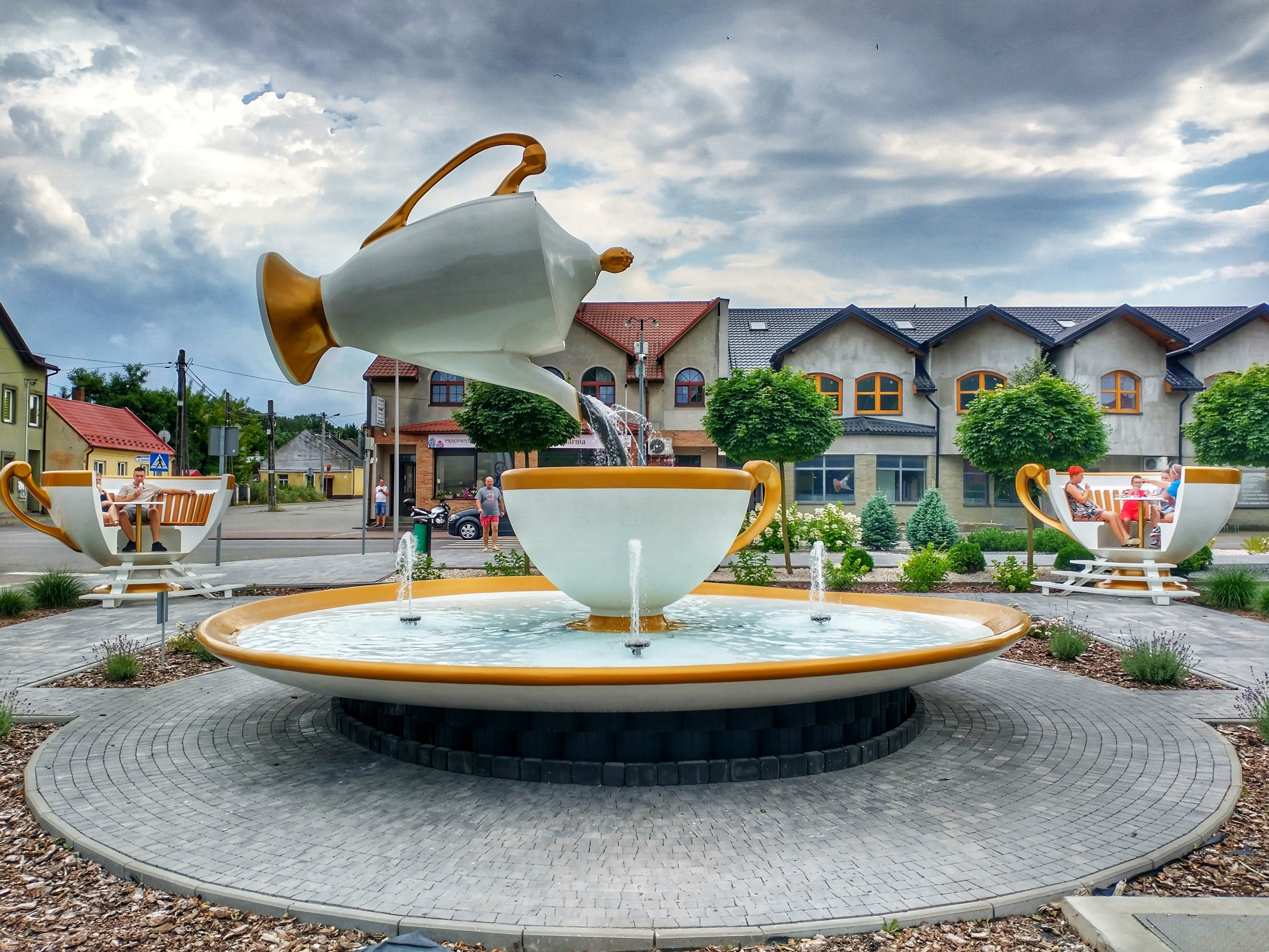
- Market Square

- Coat of arms

- Location within Poland
- Coordinates: 50°53′25″N 21°30′53″E
- Country: Poland
- Voivodeship: Świętokrzyskie
- County: Ostrowiec
- Gmina: Ćmielów
- First mentioned: 14th century
- Town rights: 1505

Government
  - Mayor: Joanna Suska

Area
  - Total: 13.21 km^{2} (5.10 sq mi)

Population (31 December 2021)
  - Total: 2,954
  - Density: 223.6/km^{2} (579.2/sq mi)
- Postal code: 27–440
- Area code: +48 15
- Car plates: TOS
- Website: http://www.cmielow.pl/

Ćmielów [ˈt͡ɕmʲɛluf] is a town in Ostrowiec County, Świętokrzyskie Voivodeship, Poland. It is the seat of Gmina Ćmielów. As of December 2021, it has 2,954 inhabitants. It is known for one of Poland's oldest porcelain factories dating back to 1790. The town history dates back to 14th century. It has several tourist attractions, in addition to its old porcelain factory, including ruins of a 16th-century castle and a church from the same period. Ćmielów belongs to Lesser Poland, and lies on the Kamienna river in the Sandomierz Upland, 10 kilometers east of Ostrowiec Świętokrzyski, along local road nr. 755.

== History ==
=== Village ===
First mention of the village comes from the 14th century. In 1388, brothers Marcin and Mikołaj from Baruchów sold the village and the castle to knight Gniewosz of Dalewice. In 1425 Ćmielów was bought by Jan of Podłodów, then the village was acquired by the noble Szydłowiecki family. At that time what today is Ćmielów was divided into two villages - Ćmielów itself, located in the vicinity of the castle, and nearby Szydłów. Both villages were merged in 1505, when in Radom, King Aleksander Jagiellon granted town charter to the town of Ćmielów.

=== Town ===
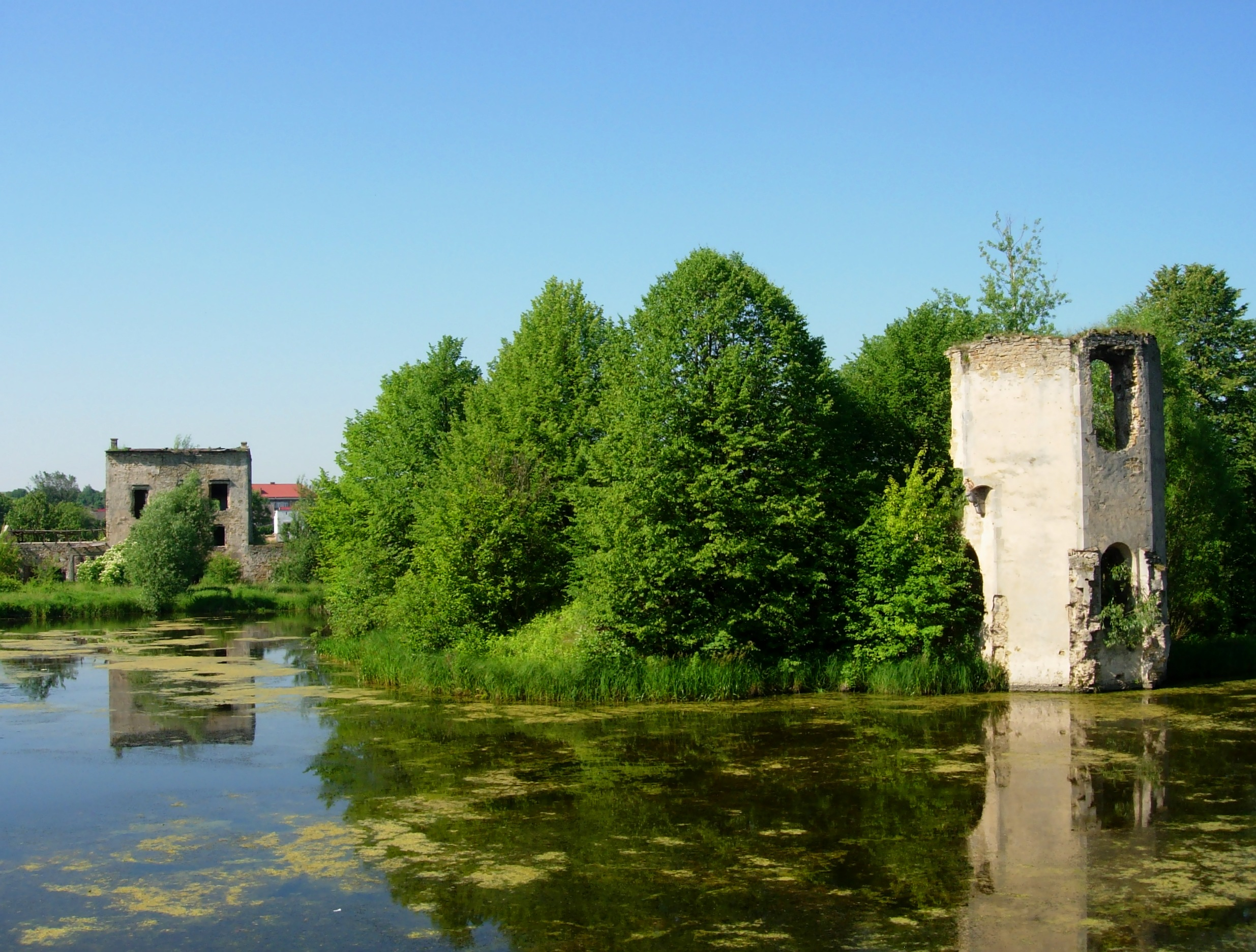
Ćmielów Castle

The new town remained in the hands of the Szydłowiecki family, which turned it into one of their residences. Chancellor Krzysztof Szydłowiecki invested in the castle, making it a Renaissance palace (1519-1531). In 1606, Ćmielów passed into the hands of the Ostrogski family.

Prosperity of the town came to an end during the Swedish invasion of Poland. On April 12, 1657, Swedish and Transylvanian armies met here, and the castle was the temporary residence of George II Rakoczi. United armies of the two powers destroyed most of Lesser Poland, together with Ćmielów. In the 18th century the town belonged to several families (Lubomirski family, Małachowski family, Pusłowski family), and in 1896 - to Prince Aleksander Drucki-Lubecki. Some time in the 18th century Ćmielów emerged as a center of pottery. In 1750, King Augustus III of Poland issued a privilege to local artisans, allowing them to sell their products across the country. The privilege was confirmed in 1768, and either in 1804 or 1809, Count Jacek Małachowski opened here a porcelain factory.

In 1795, following the Third Partition of Poland, Ćmielów was annexed by Austria. After the Polish victory in the Austro-Polish War of 1809, it became part of the short-lived Duchy of Warsaw, and after the duchy's dissolution in 1815, it became part of Russian-controlled Congress Poland. Following other towns of northern Lesser Poland, Ćmielów lost its town charter in 1869, as a punishment for the January Uprising. In 1915 it received a rail station, along a route from Skarżysko-Kamienna to Sandomierz.

=== World War II ===
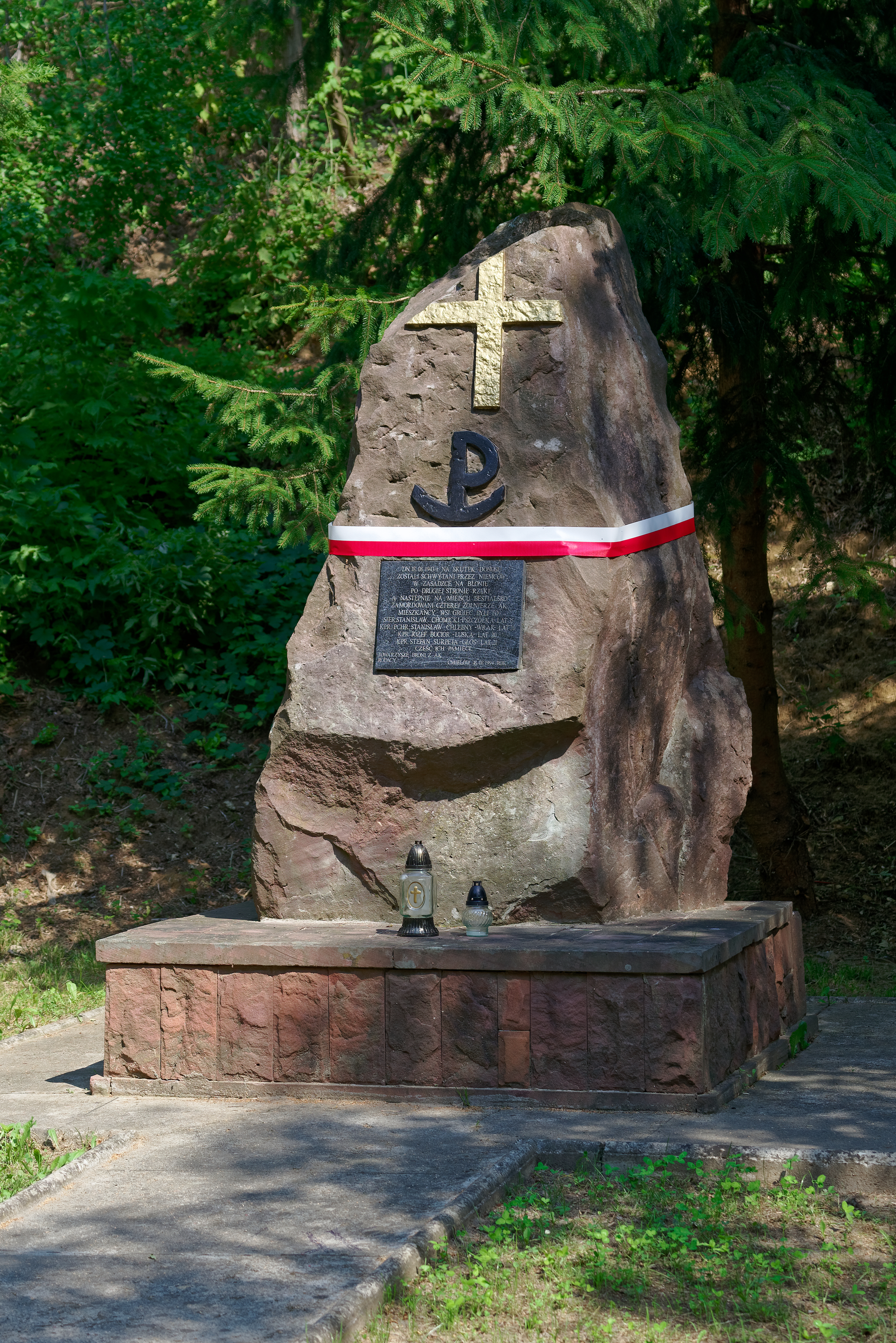
Monument at the place where Home Army partisans were murdered by German forces in 1943

When the Germans occupied Ćmielów in September 1939, they began immediately to rob and starve the Jewish community. In June 1942, the Nazi Germans set up a Jewish ghetto in Ćmielów for about 1,500–2,000 Polish Jews, including all of Ćmielów's 500 Jews. Conditions worsened through hunger, overcrowding, and a typhus epidemic. In late October, 1942, some younger Jews were sent to labor camps, other Jews were murdered in the town, and some 900 Jews were sent to Treblinka extermination camp where they were immediately murdered by gassing. Few of the Jewish community survived; after the war 16 Jews registered in the town but none stayed.

=== Modern town ===
Ćmielów regained its town charter in 1962.

== Sights ==
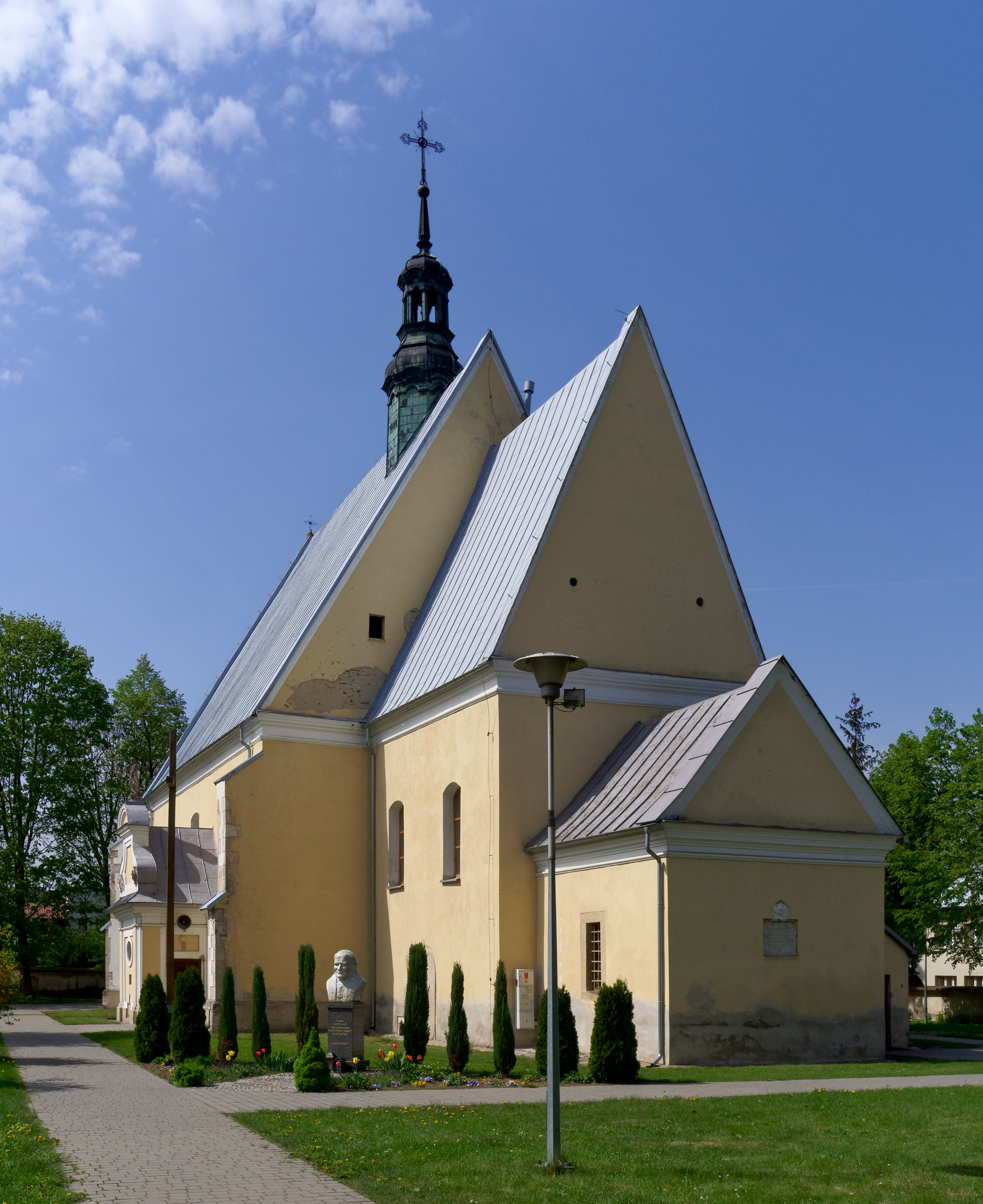
Church of the Assumption

Among points of interest are the ruins of the castle, parish church (first built in the late 14th century), roadside chapel (1850s), and the St. Florian figure.

There is also the Living Porcelain Museum (Polish: Żywe Muzeum Porcelany) in relation to the rich local tradition of porcelain production.

== External sources ==
- Official website

Media related to Ćmielów at Wikimedia Commons
