= Sarnówek =

Sarnówek may refer to:

- Sarnówek, Kuyavian-Pomeranian Voivodeship, a village in the administrative district of Gmina Cekcyn, Tuchola County, Poland
- Sarnówek, Warmian-Masurian Voivodeship, a village in the administrative district of Gmina Iława, Iława County, Poland
- Sarnówek Duży, a village in the administrative district of Gmina Bodzechów, Poland
- Sarnówek Mały, a village in the administrative district of Gmina Bodzechów, Poland
- Sarnówek, a village in the administrative district of Gmina Dalików, Poland
