= Szyby =

- Village
- Location within Poland
- Coordinates: 50°54′22″N 21°20′40″E
- Country: Poland
- Voivodeship: Świętokrzyskie
- County: Ostrowiec
- Gmina: Bodzechów
- Population: 380

Szyby [ˈʂɨbɨ] is a village in the administrative district of Gmina Bodzechów, within Ostrowiec County, Świętokrzyskie Voivodeship, in south-central Poland. It lies approximately 5 km (3 mi) south-west of Ostrowiec Świętokrzyski and 52 km (32 mi) east of the regional capital Kielce.
