= Goździelin =

- Village
- Location within Poland
- Coordinates: 50°54′7″N 21°25′21″E
- Country: Poland
- Voivodeship: Świętokrzyskie
- County: Ostrowiec
- Gmina: Bodzechów
- Population: 600

Goździelin [ɡɔʑˈd͡ʑɛlin] is a village in the administrative district of Gmina Bodzechów, within Ostrowiec County, Świętokrzyskie Voivodeship, in south-central Poland. It lies approximately 4 km (2 mi) south-east of Ostrowiec Świętokrzyski and 57 km (35 mi) east of the regional capital Kielce.
