= Denkówek =

- Village
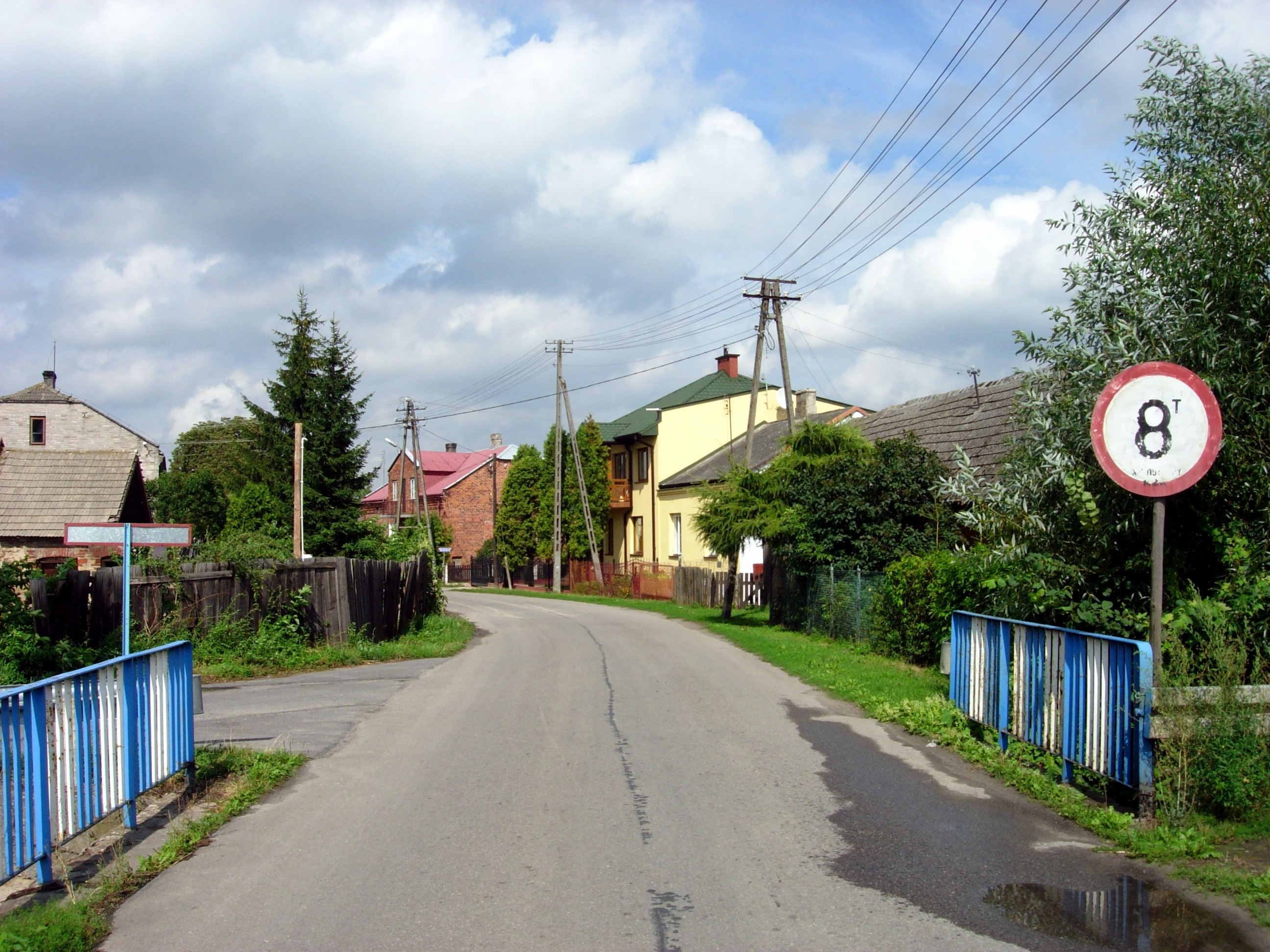

- Location within Poland
- Coordinates: 50°55′6″N 21°24′1″E
- Country: Poland
- Voivodeship: Świętokrzyskie
- County: Ostrowiec
- Gmina: Bodzechów
- Population: 980

Denkówek [dɛnˈkuvɛk] is a village in the administrative district of Gmina Bodzechów, within Ostrowiec County, Świętokrzyskie Voivodeship, in south-central Poland. It lies approximately 2 km (1 mi) south of Ostrowiec Świętokrzyski and 56 km (35 mi) east of the regional capital Kielce.
