= Szewna =

- Village
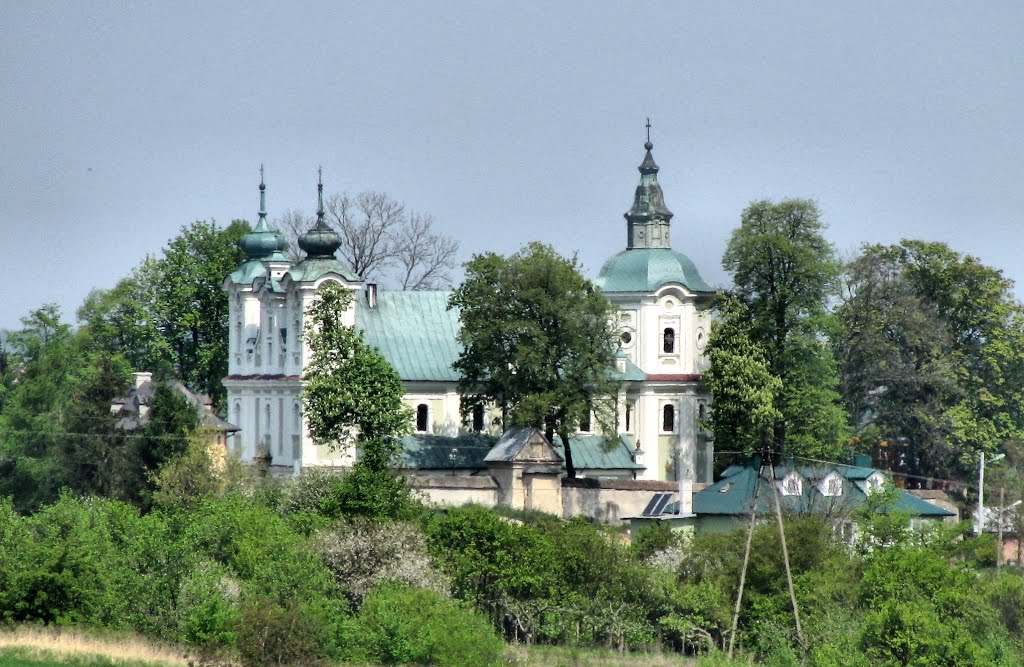
- Catholic church

- Location within Poland
- Coordinates: 50°54′23″N 21°21′57″E
- Country: Poland
- Voivodeship: Świętokrzyskie
- County: Ostrowiec
- Gmina: Bodzechów
- Population: 1,900

Szewna [ˈʂɛvna] is a village in the administrative district of Gmina Bodzechów, within Ostrowiec County, Świętokrzyskie Voivodeship, in south-central Poland. It lies approximately 4 km (2 mi) south-west of Ostrowiec Świętokrzyski and 53 km (33 mi) east of the regional capital Kielce.

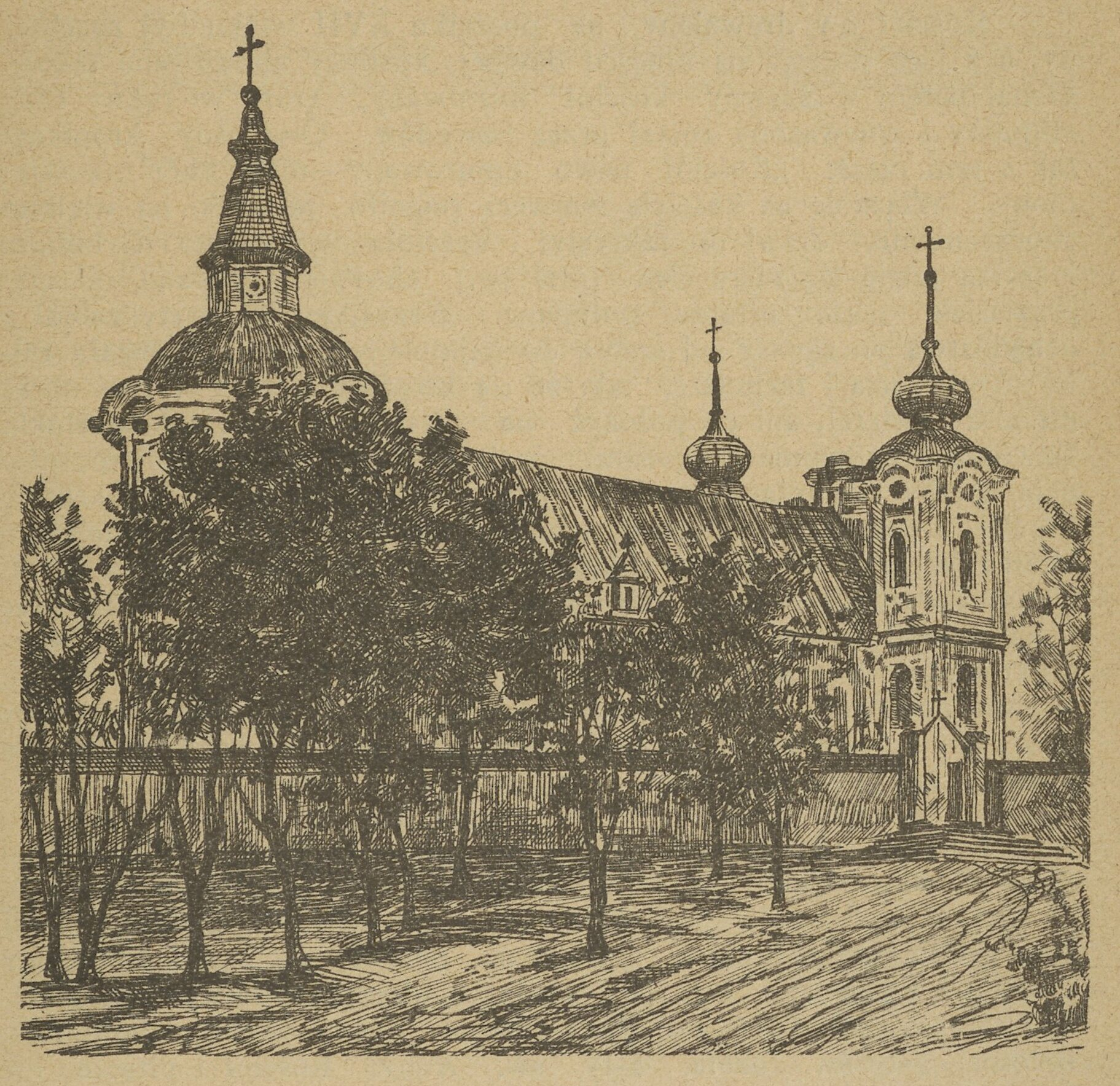
Church in Szewna before 1907
