= Nowa Dębowa Wola =

- Village
- Location within Poland
- Coordinates: 51°0′20″N 21°24′1″E
- Country: Poland
- Voivodeship: Świętokrzyskie
- County: Ostrowiec
- Gmina: Bodzechów
- Population: 220

Nowa Dębowa Wola [ˈnɔva dɛmˈbɔva ˈvɔla] is a village in the administrative district of Gmina Bodzechów, within Ostrowiec County, Świętokrzyskie Voivodeship, in south-central Poland. It lies approximately 9 km (6 mi) north of Ostrowiec Świętokrzyski and 57 km (35 mi) east of the regional capital Kielce.
