= Szwarszowice =

- Village
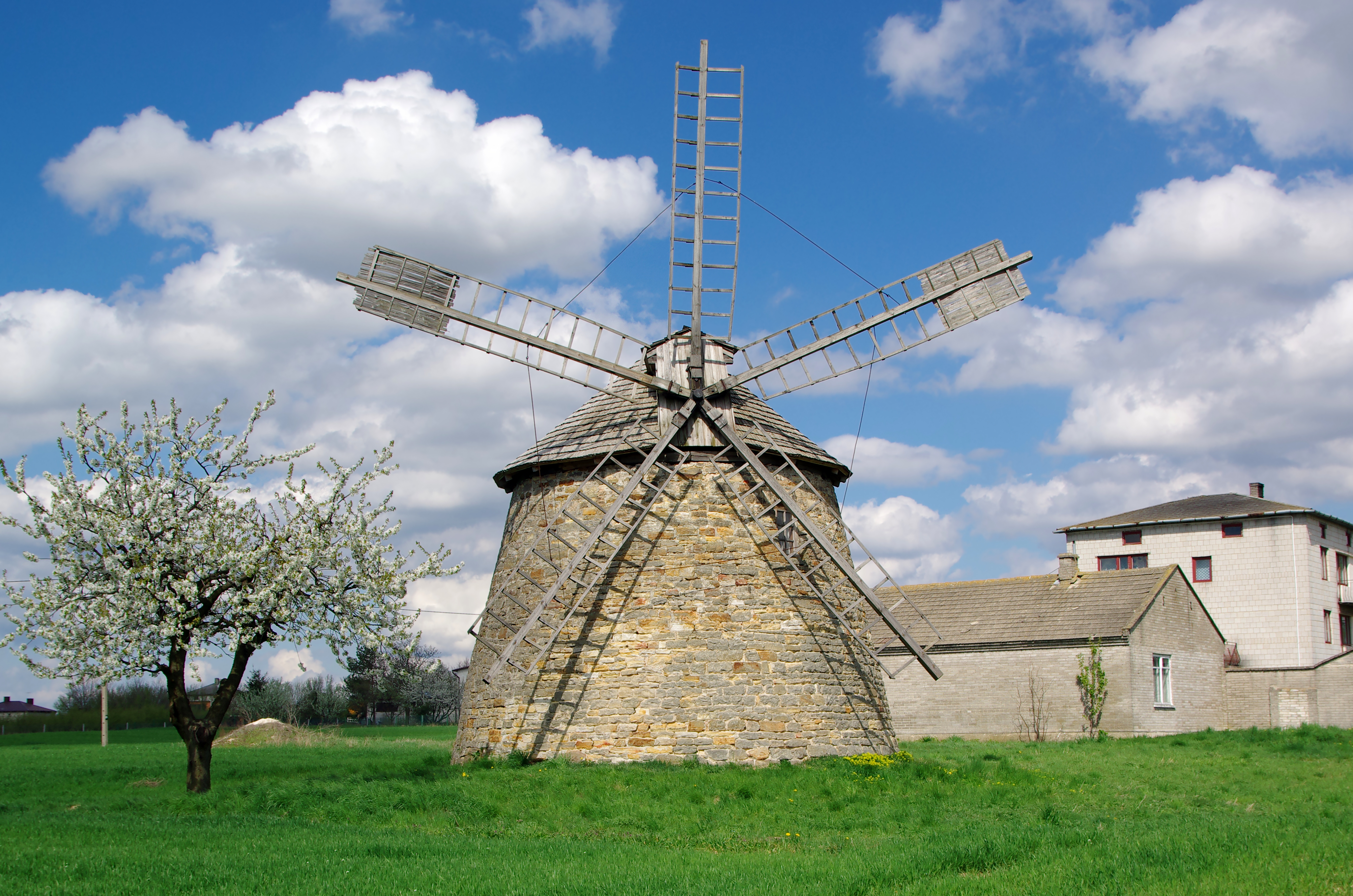
- Windmill

- Location within Poland
- Coordinates: 50°53′39″N 21°17′32″E
- Country: Poland
- Voivodeship: Świętokrzyskie
- County: Ostrowiec
- Gmina: Bodzechów
- Population: 330

Szwarszowice [ʂfarʂɔˈvit͡sɛ] is a village in the administrative district of Gmina Bodzechów, within Ostrowiec County, Świętokrzyskie Voivodeship, in south-central Poland. It lies approximately 9 km (6 mi) south-west of Ostrowiec Świętokrzyski and 48 km (30 mi) east of the regional capital Kielce.
