= Świrna =

- Village
- Location within Poland
- Coordinates: 50°55′21″N 21°20′4″E
- Country: Poland
- Voivodeship: Świętokrzyskie
- County: Ostrowiec
- Gmina: Bodzechów
- Population: 410

Świrna [ˈɕfirna] is a village in the administrative district of Gmina Bodzechów, within Ostrowiec County, Świętokrzyskie Voivodeship, in south-central Poland. It lies approximately 5 km (3 mi) west of Ostrowiec Świętokrzyski and 51 km (32 mi) east of the regional capital Kielce.
