= Stara Dębowa Wola =

- Village
- Location within Poland
- Coordinates: 51°0′7″N 21°25′51″E
- Country: Poland
- Voivodeship: Świętokrzyskie
- County: Ostrowiec
- Gmina: Bodzechów
- Population: 290

Stara Dębowa Wola [ˈstara dɛmˈbɔva ˈvɔla] is a village in the administrative district of Gmina Bodzechów, within Ostrowiec County, Świętokrzyskie Voivodeship, in south-central Poland. It lies approximately 8 km (5 mi) north of Ostrowiec Świętokrzyski and 59 km (37 mi) east of the regional capital Kielce.
