= Podszkodzie =

- Village
- Location within Poland
- Coordinates: 50°54′5″N 21°20′4″E
- Country: Poland
- Voivodeship: Świętokrzyskie
- County: Ostrowiec
- Gmina: Bodzechów
- Population: 420

Podszkodzie [pɔtʂˈkɔd͡ʑɛ] is a village in the administrative district of Gmina Bodzechów, within Ostrowiec County, Świętokrzyskie Voivodeship, in south-central Poland. It lies approximately 6 km (4 mi) south-west of Ostrowiec Świętokrzyski and 51 km (32 mi) east of the regional capital Kielce.
