= Antoni Rewera =

Polish Roman Catholic priest and martyr (1869–1942)

Blessed Antoni Rewera
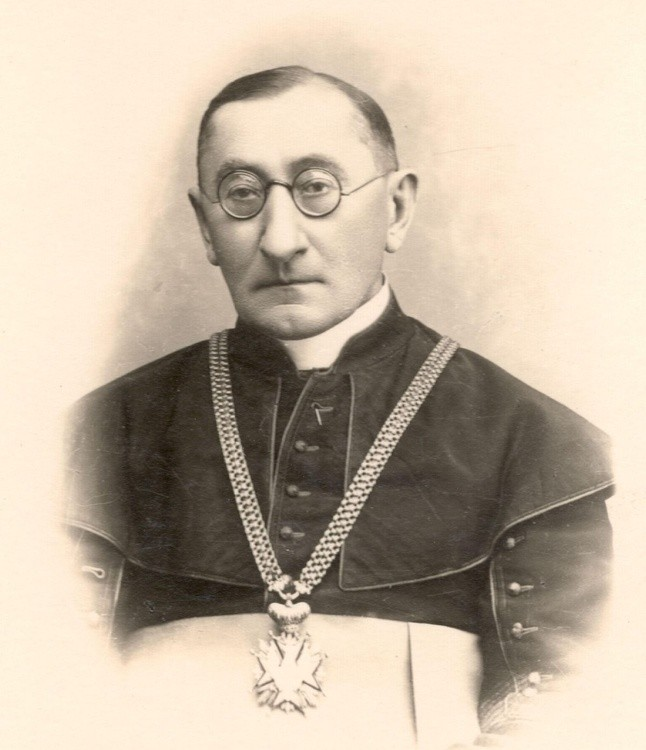

Priest and Martyr
- Born: 6 January 1869; Samborzec
- Died: 1 October 1942 (aged 73); Dachau concentration camp
- Beatified: 13 June 1999, Warsaw by Pope John Paul II
- Feast: 14 June

Antoni Rewera (6 January 1869 – 1 October 1942) was a Polish Roman Catholic priest and martyr. One of the 108 Martyrs of World War II, Rewera served as a professor of the diocesan seminary in Sandomierz for 16 years and as dean of its cathedral chapter from 1931 until his death. He helped found a religious order, the Congregation of Sisters of St. Francis the Sephardic, in 1939.

== Biography ==
Rewera was born in Samborzec to Wawrzyńec and Rozalia Rewera (née Sapielak). In 1879, he began attending a proseminary in Sandomierz. He began attending the diocesan seminary at Sandomierz in 1884, continuing his studies at the Saint Petersburg Roman Catholic Theological Academy from 1889. There, he was ordained to the subdiaconate on 30 August 1891 and the diaconate on 6 September 1891. On 18 June 1893, he completed his studies at the Theological Academy, obtaining a magister degree in theology; he was ordained a priest on 2 July 1893 by Antoni Ksawery Sotkiewicz.

After his ordination, Rewera was appointed vicar for the cathedral church of the Diocese of Sandomierz. On 24 January 1894, he was appointed professor at the diocesan seminary, where he taught moral theology, biblical archaeology and the French language for 16 years. During his tenure at the seminary, he was appointed its vice-rector on 20 January 1899. He was later appointed honorary canon of the cathedral chapter of Sandomierz on 16 May 1903 and vicar of the cathedral parish of Sandomierz on 23 May 1907. He was raised to the position of regular canon on 9 July 1910, and was appointed honorary prelate of the cathedral chapter on 13 October 1912. Between these appointments, he served as administrator of the parishes of Mychów and the Church of Saint Paul in Sandomierz. He also established the first cooperative in the Sandomierz area in 1907, serving as its chairman between 1907 and 1920.

On 12 November 1920, Rewera was appointed a Domestic Prelate of His Holiness of Pope Benedict XV. He helped to canonically erect the Third Order of Saint Francis in Sandomierz on 20 June 1921, serving as its director. He was then nominated to the Third Order's national council in Poland on 1925. On 4 October 1928, he became the director of a Franciscan community house in Sandomierz; this was followed by his appointed as dean of the cathedral chapter on 13 February 1931 and provost of St. Joseph Church in Sandomierz on 28 March 1934. As the latter, he established various social initiatives as part of his pastoral work, including a brotherhood of temperance and a sodality of Peter Claver. On 4 October 1939, he submitted a constitution for a religious order (modeled from the constitution of the Third Order) to the diocesan curia of the Diocese of Sandomierz, canonically forming the Congregation of Sisters of St. Francis the Sephardic.

On 16 March 1942, at 9 a.m. local time, Rewera was arrested at St. Joseph Church on charges of collaborating to produce and distribute anti-Nazi leaflets. First held at Sandomierz Castle, he was transferred to Auschwitz on 28 March 1942, and was given the camp number 27458. He was then transferred to Dachau on 3 June 1942, where he was given the camp number 30304. He died there on 1 October 1942.

In late 1970, Rewera's process of beatification was begun by Piotr Gołębiowski at the request of the head of the Congregation he founded, Czesława Wróbel. He was beatified as one of the 108 Martyrs of World War II on 13 June 1999 at Warsaw by Pope John Paul II.

== See also ==
- List of Nazi-German concentration camps
- The Holocaust in Poland
- World War II casualties of Poland
