= Romanów, Świętokrzyskie Voivodeship =

Romanów
- Village
- Location within Poland
- Coordinates: 50°52′40″N 21°23′49″E
- Country: Poland
- Voivodeship: Świętokrzyskie
- County: Ostrowiec
- Gmina: Bodzechów
- Population: 60

Romanów [rɔˈmanuf] is a village in the administrative district of Gmina Bodzechów, within Ostrowiec County, Świętokrzyskie Voivodeship, in south-central Poland. It lies approximately 7 km (4 mi) south of Ostrowiec Świętokrzyski and 55 km (34 mi) east of the regional capital Kielce.
