= Bodzechów =

Village in Świętokrzyskie, Poland

- Village
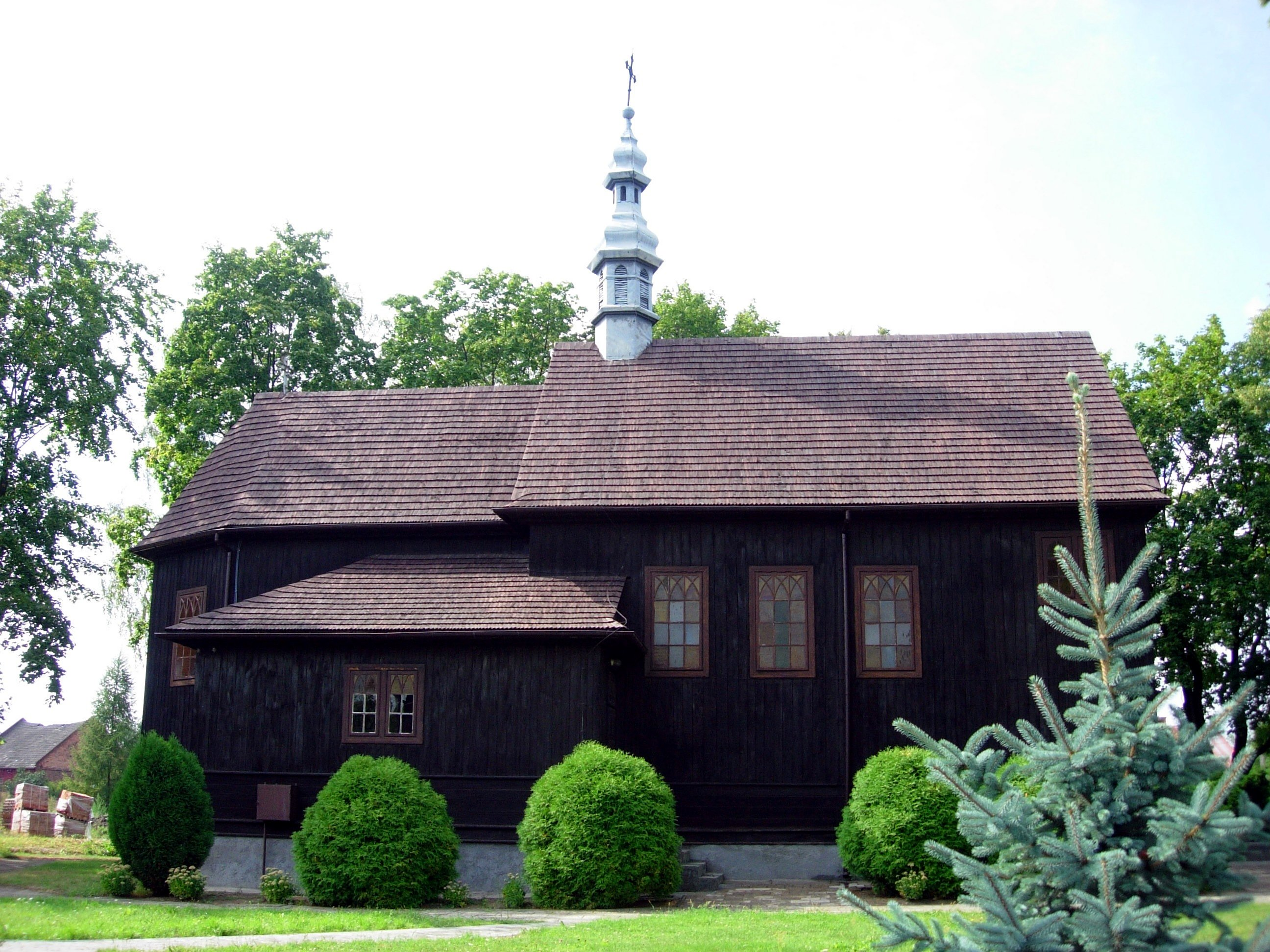
- Wooden Church of Saint Sophia

- Location within Poland
- Coordinates: 50°54′38″N 21°26′27″E
- Country: Poland
- Voivodeship: Świętokrzyskie
- County: Ostrowiec
- Gmina: Bodzechów

Bodzechów [bɔˈd͡zɛxuf] is a village in the administrative district of Gmina Bodzechów, within Ostrowiec County, Świętokrzyskie Voivodeship, in south-central Poland. It lies approximately 4 km (2 mi) south-east of Ostrowiec Świętokrzyski and 58 km (36 mi) east of the regional capital Kielce.
