= Mychów-Kolonia =

- Village
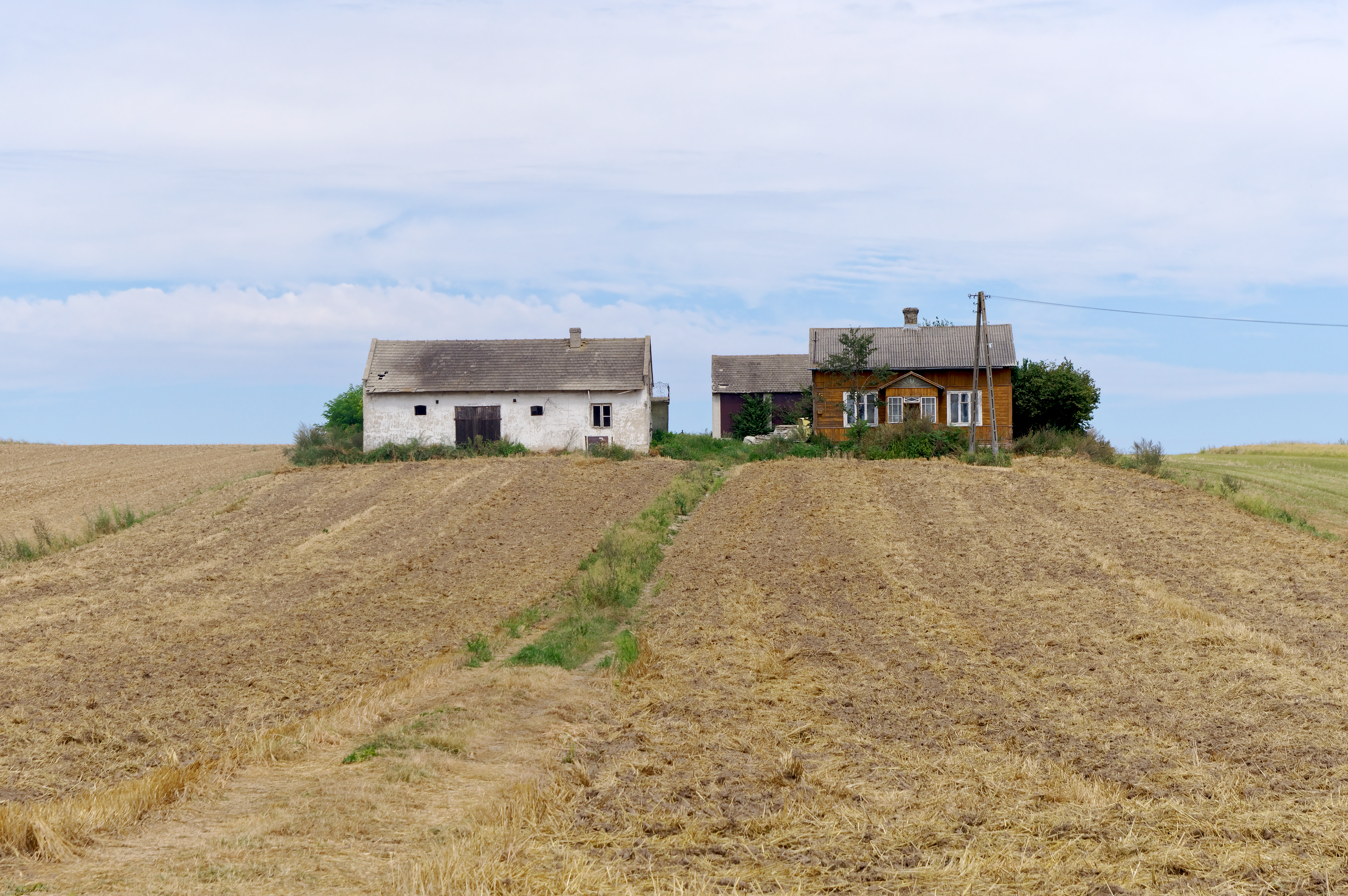

- Location within Poland
- Coordinates: 50°54′26″N 21°16′20″E
- Country: Poland
- Voivodeship: Świętokrzyskie
- County: Ostrowiec
- Gmina: Bodzechów
- Population: 220

Mychów-Kolonia [ˈmɨxuf kɔˈlɔɲa] is a village in the administrative district of Gmina Bodzechów, within Ostrowiec County, Świętokrzyskie Voivodeship, in south-central Poland. It lies approximately 10 km (6 mi) west of Ostrowiec Świętokrzyski and 47 km (29 mi) east of the regional capital Kielce.
