= Mirkowice =

Mirkowice may refer to the following places:

- Mirkowice, Greater Poland Voivodeship (west-central Poland)
- Mirkowice, Lubusz Voivodeship (west Poland)
- Mirkowice, Świętokrzyskie Voivodeship (south-central Poland)
