= Jędrzejowice =

Jędrzejowice may refer to the following places in Poland:

- Jędrzejowice, Dzierżoniów County in Lower Silesian Voivodeship (south-west Poland)
- Jędrzejowice, Świętokrzyskie Voivodeship (south-central Poland)
