= Moczydło =

Moczydło may refer to the following places:

- Moczydło, Lesser Poland Voivodeship (south Poland)
- Moczydło, Radom County, Masovian Voivodeship (east-central Poland)
- Moczydło, Warsaw, a neighbourhood in Warsaw, Masovian Voivodeship
- Moczydło, Świętokrzyskie Voivodeship (south-central Poland)
- Moczydło, Silesian Voivodeship (south Poland)
- Moczydło, Pomeranian Voivodeship (north Poland)
- Moczydło, Kartuzy County in Pomeranian Voivodeship (north Poland)
- Moczydło, West Pomeranian Voivodeship (north-west Poland)
