= Gromadzice, Świętokrzyskie Voivodeship =

Gromadzice
- Village
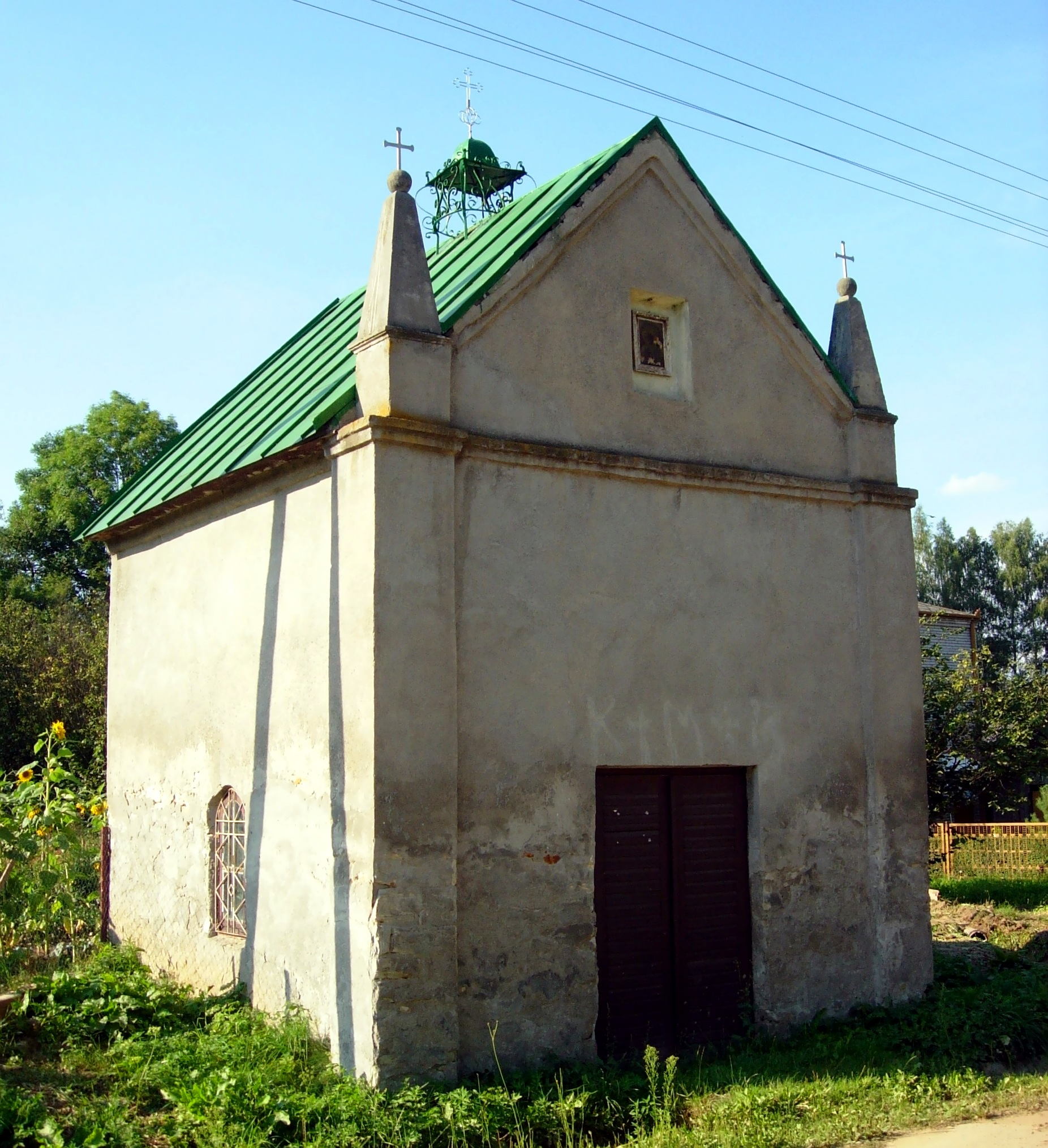
- Chapel

- Location within Poland
- Coordinates: 50°52′55″N 21°20′51″E
- Country: Poland
- Voivodeship: Świętokrzyskie
- County: Ostrowiec
- Gmina: Bodzechów
- Population: 500

Gromadzice [ɡrɔmaˈd͡ʑit͡sɛ] is a village in the administrative district of Gmina Bodzechów, within Ostrowiec County, Świętokrzyskie Voivodeship, in south-central Poland. It lies approximately 7 km (4 mi) south-west of Ostrowiec Świętokrzyski and 52 km (32 mi) east of the regional capital Kielce.
