= Miłków, Świętokrzyskie Voivodeship =

Miłków
- Village
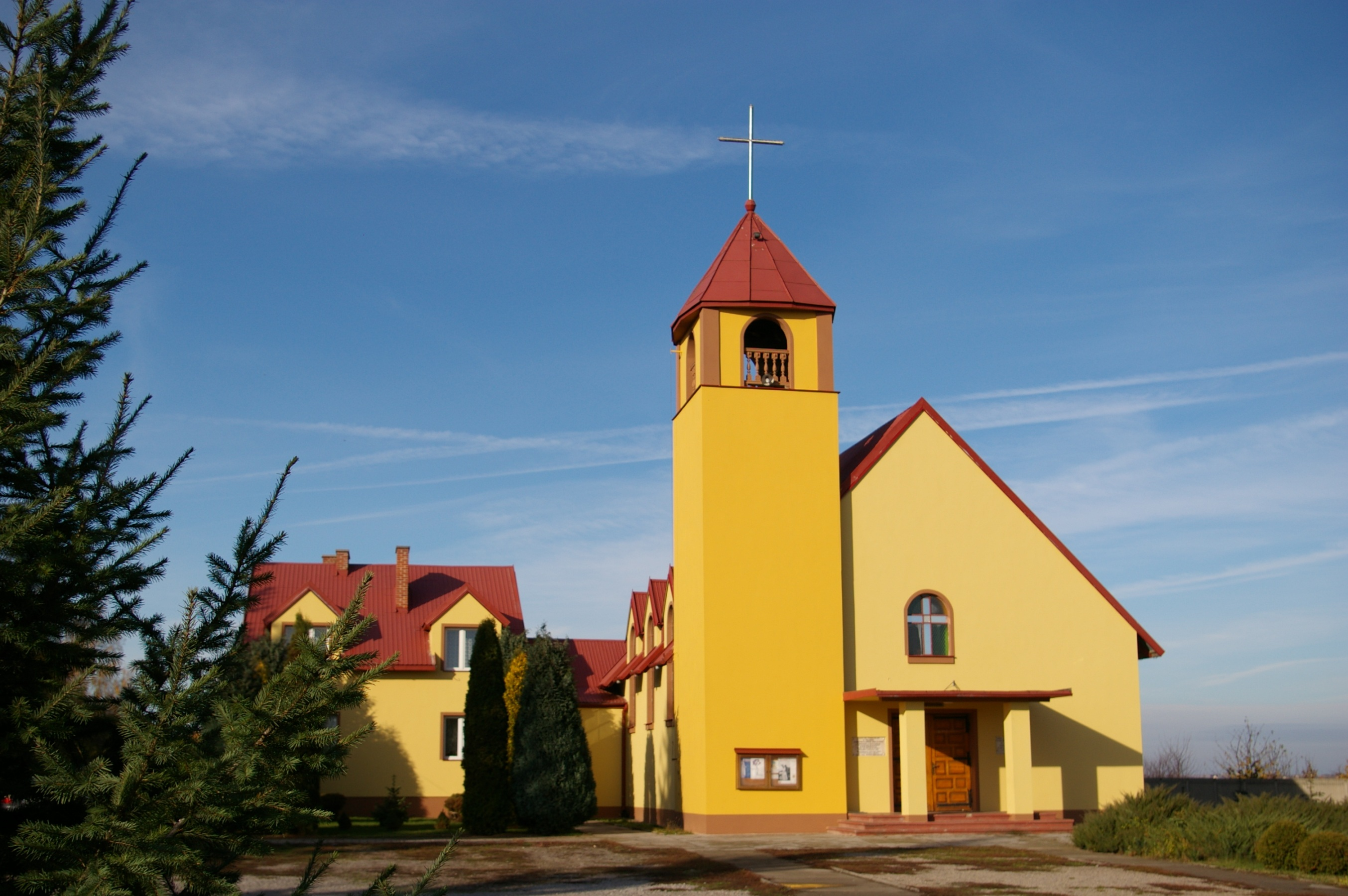
- Catholic church

- Location within Poland
- Coordinates: 50°54′N 21°23′E
- Country: Poland
- Voivodeship: Świętokrzyskie
- County: Ostrowiec
- Gmina: Bodzechów

Miłków [ˈmiu̯kuf] is a village in the administrative district of Gmina Bodzechów, within Ostrowiec County, Świętokrzyskie Voivodeship, in south-central Poland. It lies approximately 4 km (2 mi) south of Ostrowiec Świętokrzyski and 54 km (34 mi) east of the regional capital Kielce.
