= Jędrzejów, Ostrowiec County =

Jędrzejów
- Village
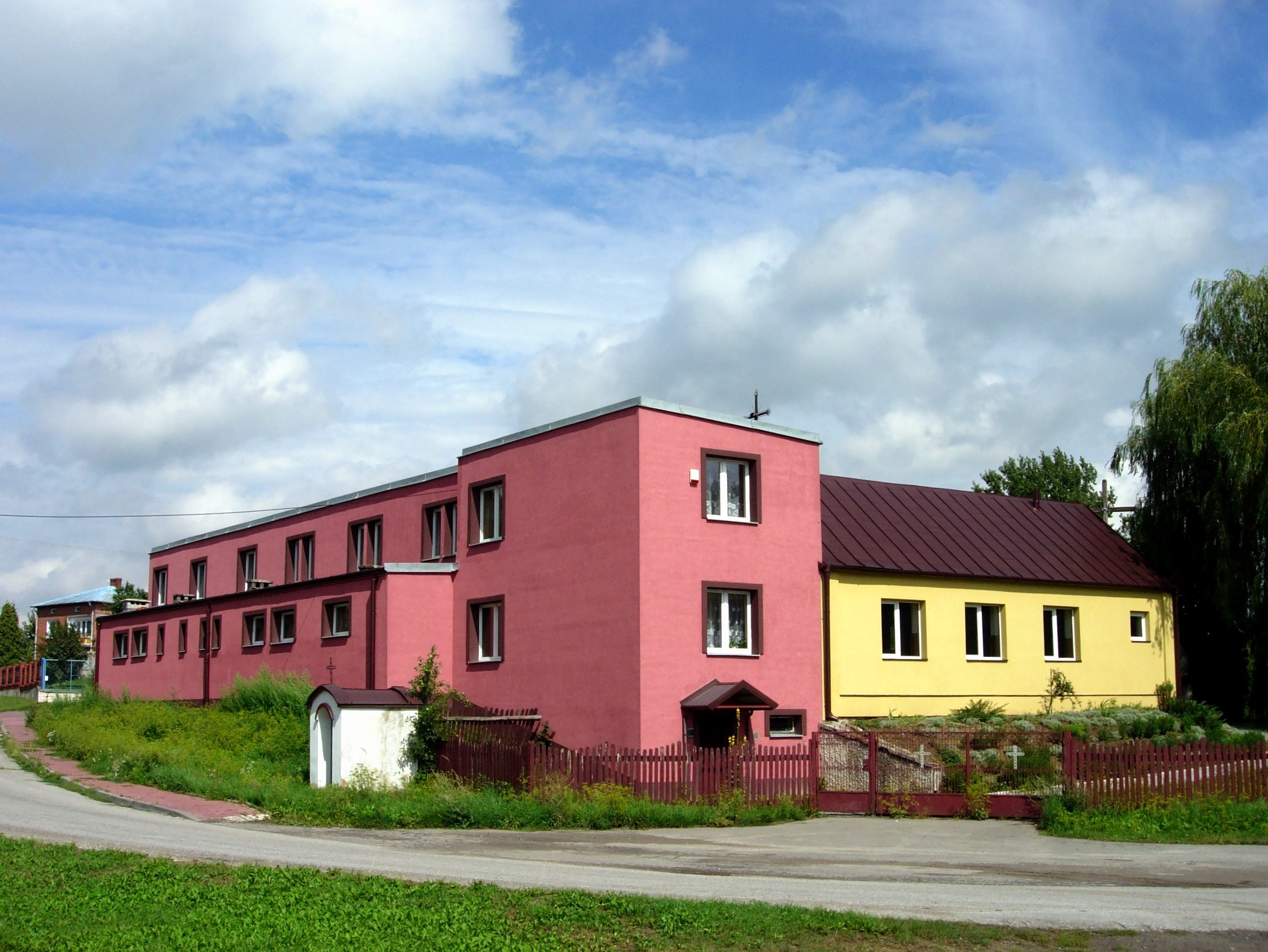

- Location within Poland
- Coordinates: 50°54′12″N 21°24′5″E
- Country: Poland
- Voivodeship: Świętokrzyskie
- County: Ostrowiec
- Gmina: Bodzechów
- Population: 310

Jędrzejów (Polish pronunciation: [jɛnˈdʐɛjuf]) is a village in the administrative district of Gmina Bodzechów, within Ostrowiec County, Świętokrzyskie Voivodeship, in south-central Poland. It lies approximately 4 km (2 mi) south of Ostrowiec Świętokrzyski and 56 km (35 mi) east of the regional capital Kielce.
