= Gmina Bodzechów =

Gmina Bodzechów Bodzechów Commune
- Gmina
- Coat of arms
- Interactive map of Gmina Bodzechów
- Coordinates (Bozdechów): 50°54′38″N 21°26′27″E
- Country: Poland
- Voivodeship: Świętokrzyskie
- County: Ostrowiec
- Seat: Ostrowiec Świętokrzyski

Area
  - Total: 122.28 km^{2} (47.21 sq mi)

Population (2006)
  - Total: 13,388
  - Density: 109.49/km^{2} (283.57/sq mi)
- Website: http://www.bodzechow.eu/

Gmina Bodzechów is a rural gmina (administrative district) in Ostrowiec County, Świętokrzyskie Voivodeship, in south-central Poland. The district takes its name from the village of Bodzechów, but its administrative offices are in the town of Ostrowiec Świętokrzyski, which is not part of the territory of the gmina.

The gmina covers an area of 122.28 square kilometres (47.2 sq mi), and as of 2006 its total population is 13,388.

== Villages ==
Gmina Bodzechów contains the villages and settlements of Bodzechów, Broniszowice, Chmielów, Denkówek, Goździelin, Gromadzice, Jędrzejów, Jędrzejowice, Kosowice, Magonie, Miłków, Mirkowice, Moczydło, Mychów, Mychów-Kolonia, Nowa Dębowa Wola, Podszkodzie, Przyborów, Romanów, Sarnówek Duży, Sarnówek Mały, Stara Dębowa Wola, Sudół, Świrna, Szewna, Szwarszowice, Szyby and Wólka Bodzechowska.

== Neighbouring gminas ==
Gmina Bodzechów is bordered by the town of Ostrowiec Świętokrzyski and by the gminas of Bałtów, Ćmielów, Kunów, Sadowie, Sienno and Waśniów.
