= Magonie =

- Village
- Location within Poland
- Coordinates: 50°58′48″N 21°30′32″E
- Country: Poland
- Voivodeship: Świętokrzyskie
- County: Ostrowiec
- Gmina: Bodzechów
- Population: 230

Magonie [maˈɡɔɲɛ] is a village in the administrative district of Gmina Bodzechów, within Ostrowiec County, Świętokrzyskie Voivodeship, in south-central Poland. It lies approximately 10 km (6 mi) north-east of Ostrowiec Świętokrzyski and 64 km (40 mi) east of the regional capital Kielce.
