= Sudół, Ostrowiec County =

Sudół
- Village
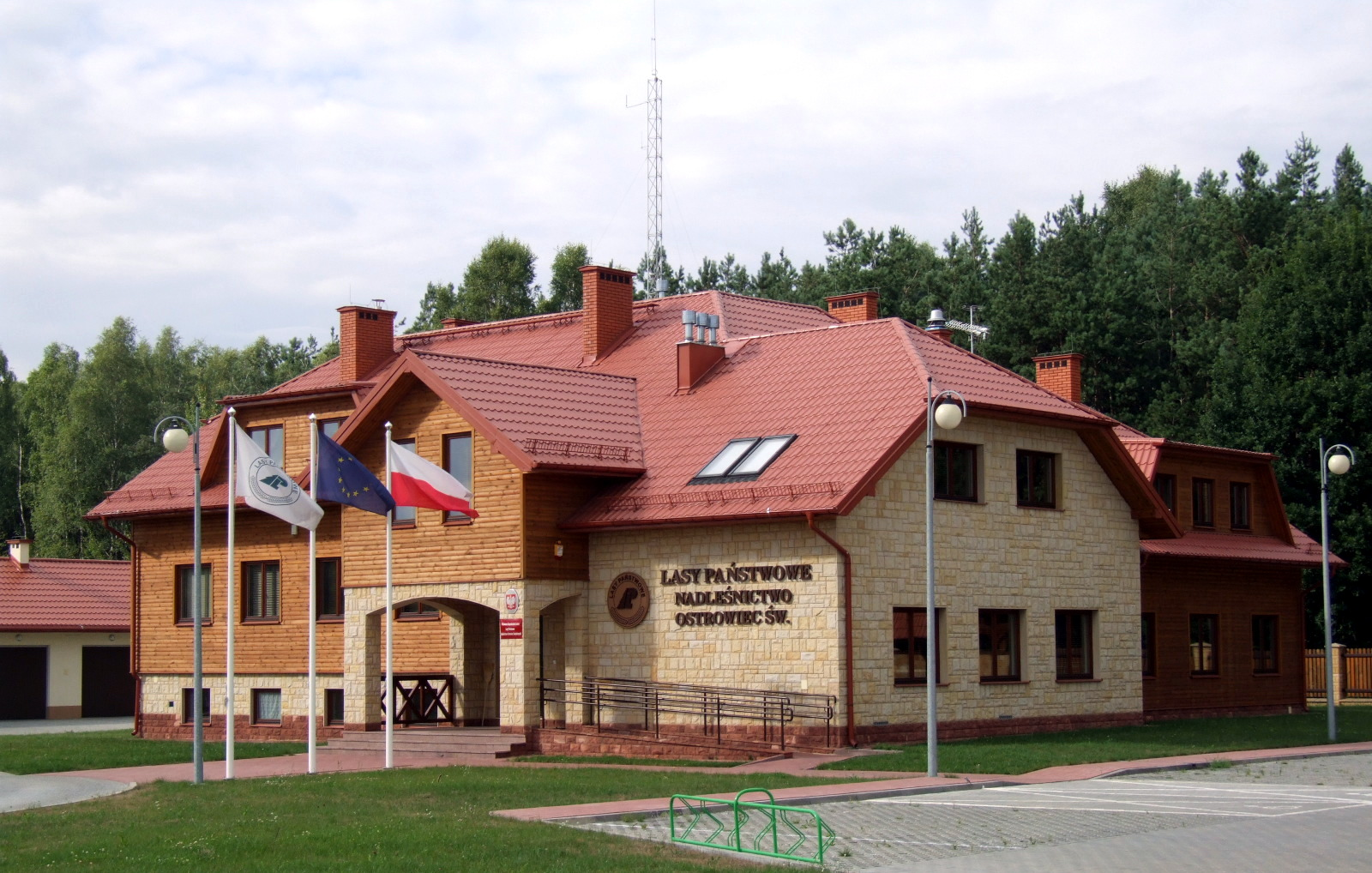
- Forestry in Sudół

- Location within Poland
- Coordinates: 50°58′10″N 21°28′21″E
- Country: Poland
- Voivodeship: Świętokrzyskie
- County: Ostrowiec
- Gmina: Bodzechów
- Population: 670
- Time zone: UTC+1 (CET)
  - Summer (DST): UTC+2 (CEST)
- Vehicle registration: TOS

Sudół [ˈsuduu̯] is a village in the administrative district of Gmina Bodzechów, within Ostrowiec County, Świętokrzyskie Voivodeship, in south-central Poland. It lies approximately 7 km (4 mi) north-east of Ostrowiec Świętokrzyski and 61 km (38 mi) east of the regional capital Kielce.

The Krzemionki Prehistoric Striped Flint Mining Region, a UNESCO World Heritage Site and Historic Monument of Poland is located in Sudół.

During the January Uprising, on 4 May 1863, the village was the site of a battle, in which Polish insurgents led by Dionizy Czachowski defeated the Russians.
