= Przyborów, Świętokrzyskie Voivodeship =

Przyborów
- Village
- Location within Poland
- Coordinates: 50°55′10″N 21°27′32″E
- Country: Poland
- Voivodeship: Świętokrzyskie
- County: Ostrowiec
- Gmina: Bodzechów
- Population: 49

Przyborów [pʂɨˈbɔruf] is a village in the administrative district of Gmina Bodzechów, within Ostrowiec County, Świętokrzyskie Voivodeship, in south-central Poland. It lies approximately 5 km (3 mi) east of Ostrowiec Świętokrzyski and 60 km (37 mi) east of the regional capital Kielce.
