= Broniszowice, Świętokrzyskie Voivodeship =

Broniszowice
- Village
- Location within Poland
- Coordinates: 50°52′20″N 21°19′40″E
- Country: Poland
- Voivodeship: Świętokrzyskie
- County: Ostrowiec
- Gmina: Bodzechów
- Population: 120

Broniszowice [brɔniʂɔˈvit͡sɛ] is a village in the administrative district of Gmina Bodzechów, within Ostrowiec County, Świętokrzyskie Voivodeship, in south-central Poland. It lies approximately 9 km (6 mi) south-west of Ostrowiec Świętokrzyski and 50 km (31 mi) east of the regional capital Kielce.
