= Wólka Bodzechowska =

- Village
- Location within Poland
- Coordinates: 50°55′38″N 21°26′57″E
- Country: Poland
- Voivodeship: Świętokrzyskie
- County: Ostrowiec
- Gmina: Bodzechów
- Population: 420

Wólka Bodzechowska [ˈvulka bɔd͡zɛˈxɔfska] is a village in the administrative district of Gmina Bodzechów, within Ostrowiec County, Świętokrzyskie Voivodeship, in south-central Poland. It lies approximately 4 km (2 mi) east of Ostrowiec Świętokrzyski and 59 km (37 mi) east of the regional capital Kielce.
