= Chmielów, Ostrowiec County =

Chmielów
- Village
- Location within Poland
- Coordinates: 50°56′14″N 21°19′46″E
- Country: Poland
- Voivodeship: Świętokrzyskie
- County: Ostrowiec
- Gmina: Bodzechów
- Population: 920
- Time zone: UTC+1 (CET)
  - Summer (DST): UTC+2 (CEST)
- Postal code: 27-400
- Area code: +48 41
- Website: https://web.archive.org/web/20070824084541/http://www.chmielow.ovh.org/

Chmielów [ˈxmjɛluf] is a village in the administrative district of Gmina Bodzechów, within Ostrowiec County, Świętokrzyskie Voivodeship, in south-central Poland. It lies approximately 5 km (3 mi) west of Ostrowiec Świętokrzyski and 51 km (32 mi) east of the regional capital Kielce.

Polish Olympic athlete Witold Baran was born in Chmielów.
