= Moczydło, Świętokrzyskie Voivodeship =

Moczydło
- Village
- Location within Poland
- Coordinates: 50°53′31″N 21°24′36″E
- Country: Poland
- Voivodeship: Świętokrzyskie
- County: Ostrowiec
- Gmina: Bodzechów

Moczydło [mɔˈt͡ʂɨdwɔ] is a village in the administrative district of Gmina Bodzechów, within Ostrowiec County, Świętokrzyskie Voivodeship, in south-central Poland. It lies approximately 5 km (3 mi) south of Ostrowiec Świętokrzyski and 56 km (35 mi) east of the regional capital Kielce.
