= Jędrzejowice, Świętokrzyskie Voivodeship =

Jędrzejowice
- Village
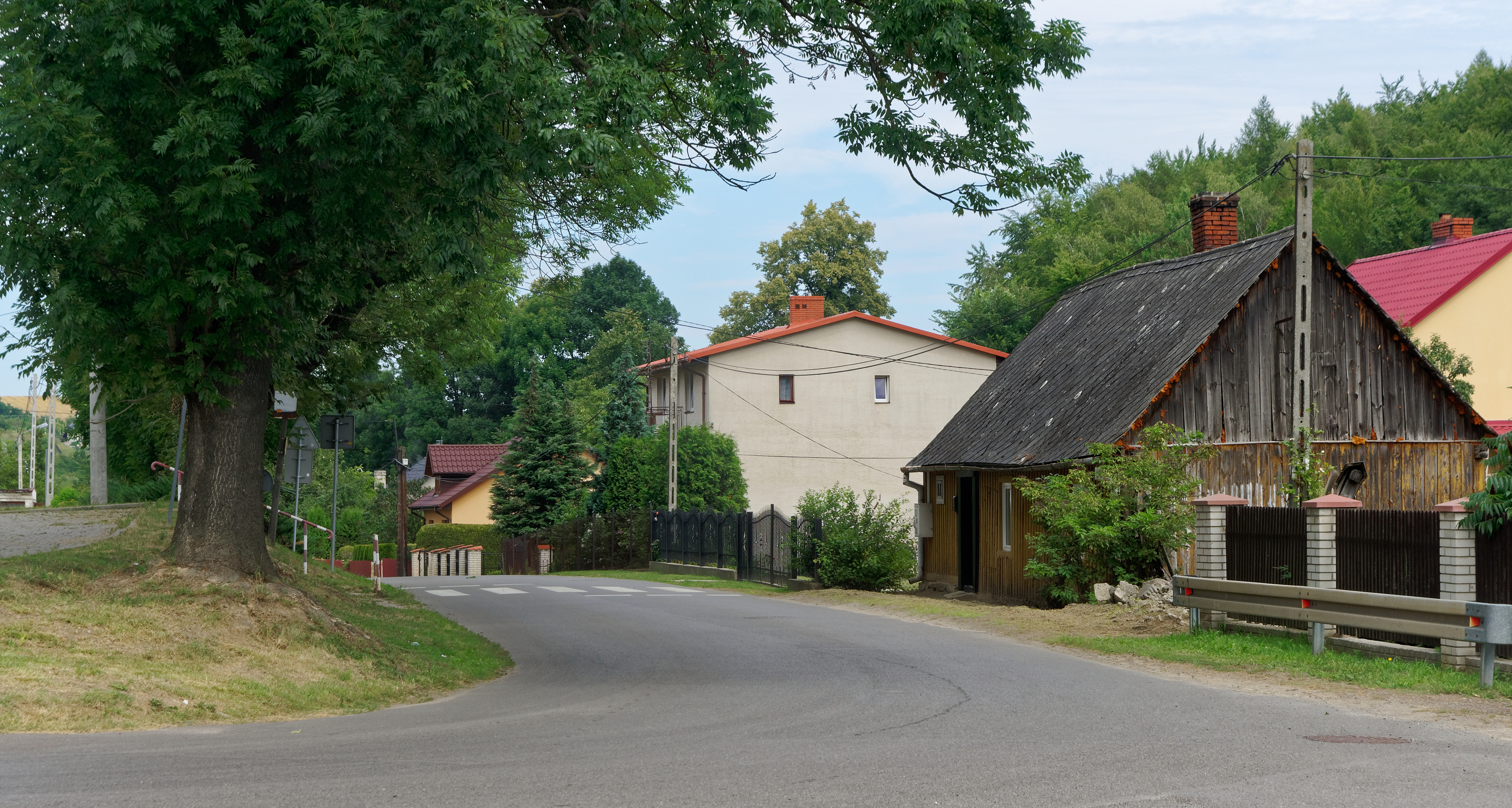

- Location within Poland
- Coordinates: 50°54′53″N 21°19′28″E
- Country: Poland
- Voivodeship: Świętokrzyskie
- County: Ostrowiec
- Gmina: Bodzechów
- Population: 380

Jędrzejowice (Polish pronunciation: [jɛndʐɛjɔˈvitsɛ]) is a village in the administrative district of Gmina Bodzechów, within Ostrowiec County, Świętokrzyskie Voivodeship, in south-central Poland. It lies approximately 6 km (4 mi) west of Ostrowiec Świętokrzyski and 50 km (31 mi) east of the regional capital Kielce.
