= Anna Wasilewska =

Polish politician (1958–2021)

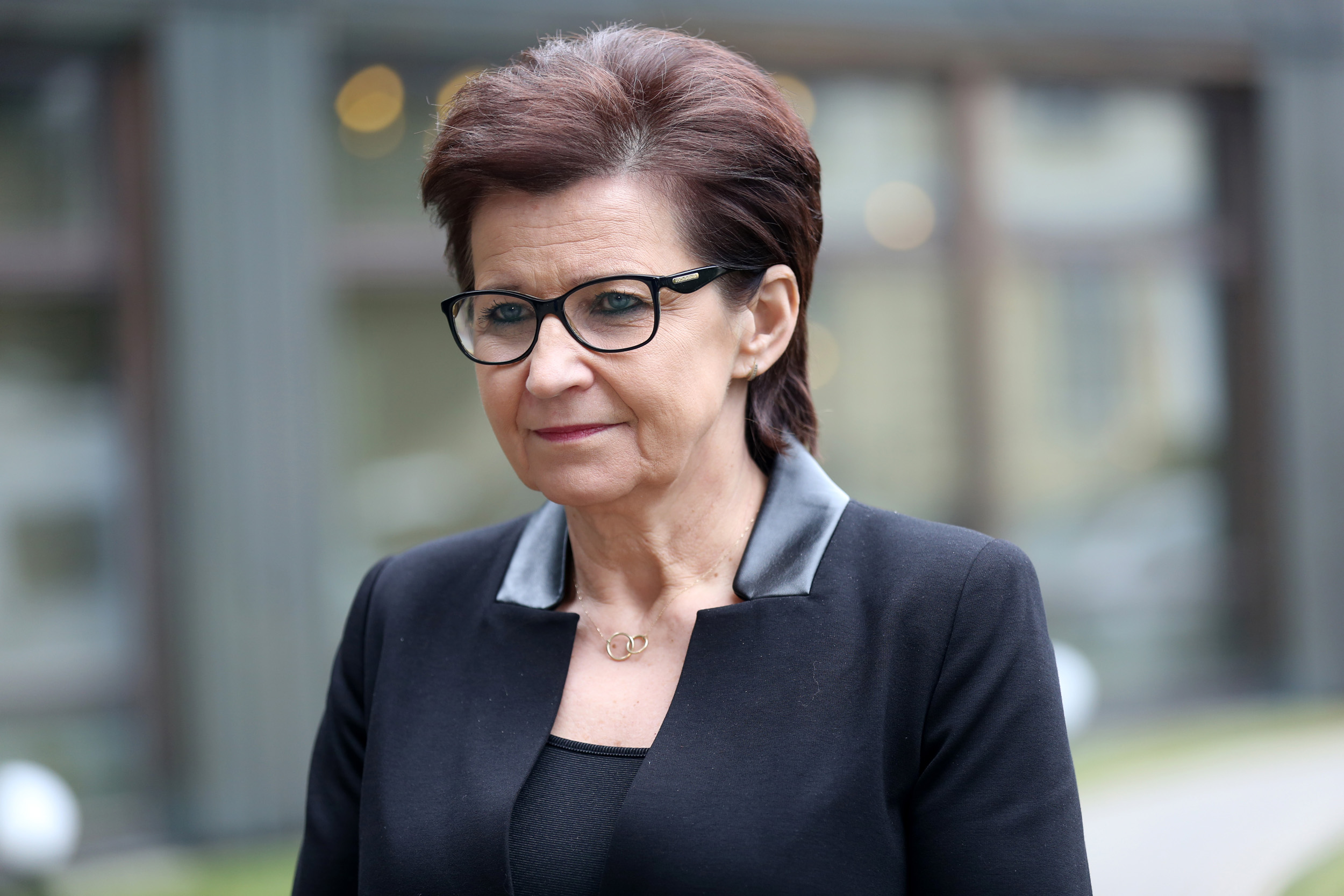

Member of the Sejm
- In office 2015–2021

Personal details
- Born: 10 January 1958 Ostrowiec Świętokrzyski
- Died: 6 April 2021 (aged 63) Olsztyn
- Party: Civic Platform

Anna Wasilewska (10 January 1958 – 6 April 2021) was a Polish politician. She was deputy marshal in the Warmian-Masurian Voivodeship. Wasilewska was elected to the Sejm in 2015 and 2019. She served as a member of the Polish Sejm for the 35th district from 2015 until her death.
