= Meir Yechiel Halevi Halstock =

Hassidic rabbi

Meir Yechiel Halevi Halstock (1852-11 March 1928) also known as the Ostrovtser Rebbe was a Hassidic rabbi who spent much of his life based in the city of Ostrowiec Świętokrzyski.

== Early life ==
Halstock was born in Savin, near Kraków where his father and grandfather before him worked as bakers. At the age of 10 he began to study with Rabbi Elimelech of Grodzisk.

At the age of 28 he was appointed the rabbi of Sakranovitz. Because of his youth the town requested that he get semicha from a number of specific rabbis including Josua Heschel Kuttner, who wrote "how can a fly with his wings cut off give testimony about an eagle that soars in the sky".

== Rabbi of Ostrowiec ==
Halstock was appointed the rabbi of Ostrowiec in south central Poland. He was extreme in his ascetic worldview. For the last 40 years of his life he would not eat through the day, and would only have a small meal at night. The exception to this was during Shabbat and the festivals.

By the end of his life many of his organs had shut down because of the years of fasting, and he was left bed ridden and constantly cold.

Halstock used gematria (numerology based on the Hebrew alphabet) and mathematical formulas to explain passages in the Talmud.

He donated a portion of his wages to charities in Israel during the British Mandate for Palestine.

Following his death he was succeeded in his position by his son, Yehezkel, who was murdered by the Nazis.

== Desecration of grave ==
Halstock's grave has been desecrated a number of times by the local Polish community.

His grave was destroyed during the Holocaust and was rededicated by the surviving community after the war. In 2018 the grave was again desecrated by local vandals.
