= Anna Kędzierska =

Polish politician (1932–2020)

Anna Kędzierska (1932 – 16 September 2020) was a Polish economist and politician who served as Minister of Internal Trade and Service in the government of Poland.

She was born in Ostrowiec Świętokrzyski, and was a graduate of the Higher School of Economics in Częstochowa.
