= Mychów =

- Village
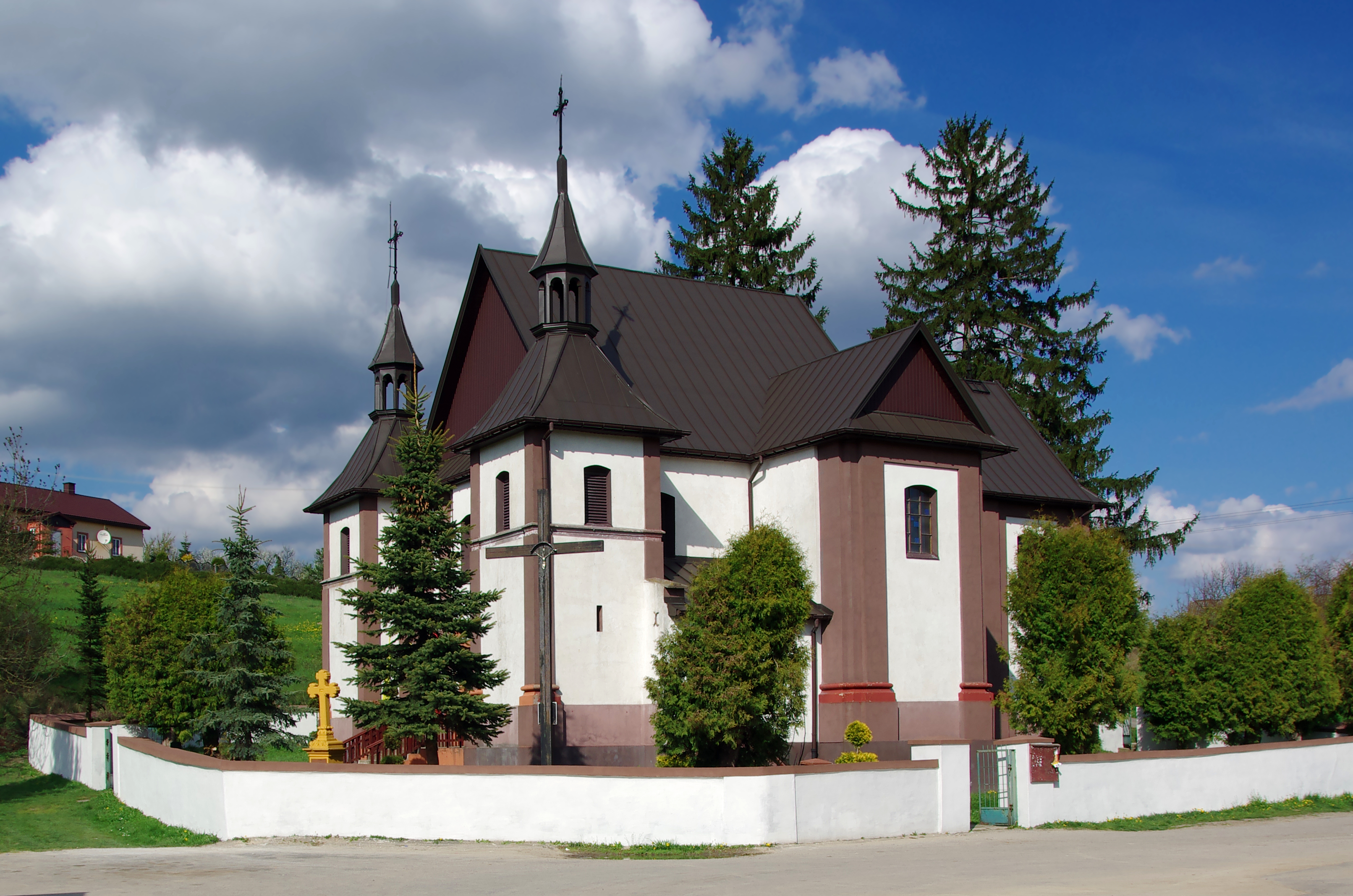
- Catholic church

- Location within Poland
- Coordinates: 50°54′40″N 21°17′11″E
- Country: Poland
- Voivodeship: Świętokrzyskie
- County: Ostrowiec
- Gmina: Bodzechów
- Population: 300

Mychów [ˈmɨxuf] is a village in the administrative district of Gmina Bodzechów, within Ostrowiec County, Świętokrzyskie Voivodeship, in south-central Poland. It lies approximately 9 km (6 mi) west of Ostrowiec Świętokrzyski and 48 km (30 mi) east of the regional capital Kielce.

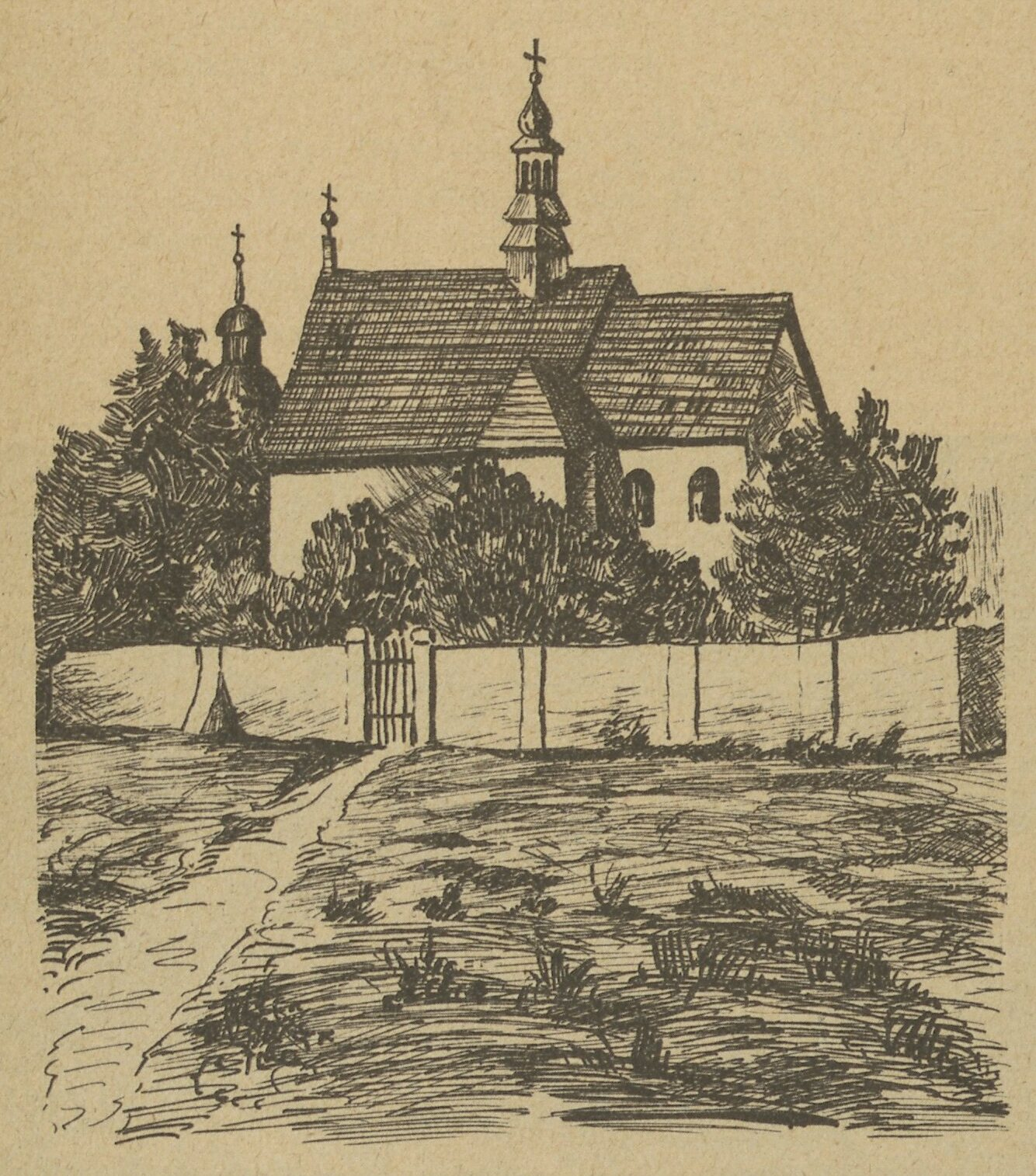
Saint Barbara church
