= Klaudiusz Łatkowski =

Polish footballer

Personal information
- Full name: Klaudiusz Łatkowski
- Date of birth: 12 March 1985 (age 41)
- Place of birth: Ostrowiec Świętokrzyski, Poland
- Height: 1.86 m (6 ft 1 in)
- Position: Defender

Senior career*
Years	Team	Apps	(Gls)
2003–2009	KSZO Ostrowiec	56	(1)
2005	→ Tłoki Gorzyce (loan)		
2009–2010	Radomiak Radom	14	(0)
2010–2011	KSZO Ostrowiec	27	(0)
2012–2014	Granat Skarżysko-Kamienna	71	(5)
2014–2017	KSZO Ostrowiec	91	(8)

International career
- Poland U17
- Poland U19
- * Club domestic league appearances and goals

Klaudiusz Łatkowski (born 12 March 1985) is a Polish former professional footballer who played as a defender.

== Honours ==
Granat Skarżysko

- III liga Lesser Poland–Świętokrzyskie: 2013–14
