= Mirkowice, Świętokrzyskie Voivodeship =

Mirkowice
- Village
- Location within Poland
- Coordinates: 50°53′13″N 21°18′42″E
- Country: Poland
- Voivodeship: Świętokrzyskie
- County: Ostrowiec
- Gmina: Bodzechów
- Population: 240

Mirkowice [mirkɔˈvit͡sɛ] is a village in the administrative district of Gmina Bodzechów, within Ostrowiec County, Świętokrzyskie Voivodeship, in south-central Poland. It lies approximately 9 km (6 mi) south-west of Ostrowiec Świętokrzyski and 49 km (30 mi) east of the regional capital Kielce.
