= Sarnówek Mały =

- Village
- Location within Poland
- Coordinates: 51°1′13″N 21°25′8″E
- Country: Poland
- Voivodeship: Świętokrzyskie
- County: Ostrowiec
- Gmina: Bodzechów
- Population: 30

Sarnówek Mały [sarˈnuvɛk ˈmawɨ] is a village in the administrative district of Gmina Bodzechów, within Ostrowiec County, Świętokrzyskie Voivodeship, in south-central Poland. It lies approximately 10 km (6 mi) north of Ostrowiec Świętokrzyski and 59 km (37 mi) east of the regional capital Kielce.
