= Artur Patek =

Polish historian

Artur Patek (born 1965) is a Polish historian at the Historical Institute of the Jagiellonian University, specializing in 20th century Polish-Jewish-Soviet history as well as the history of Polish film.
