= Ostrowiec Świętokrzyski =

City in Świętokrzyskie Voivodeship, Poland

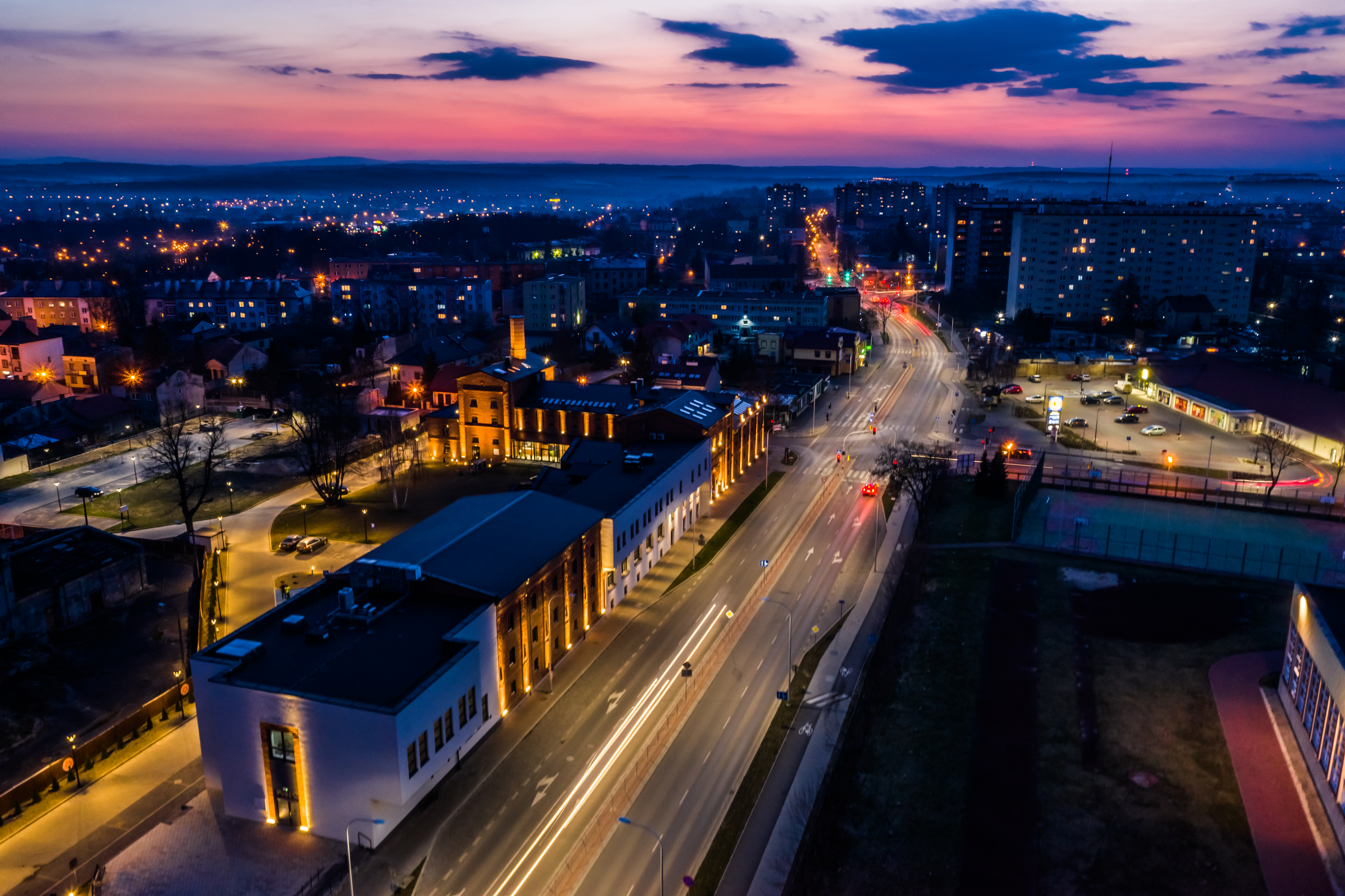
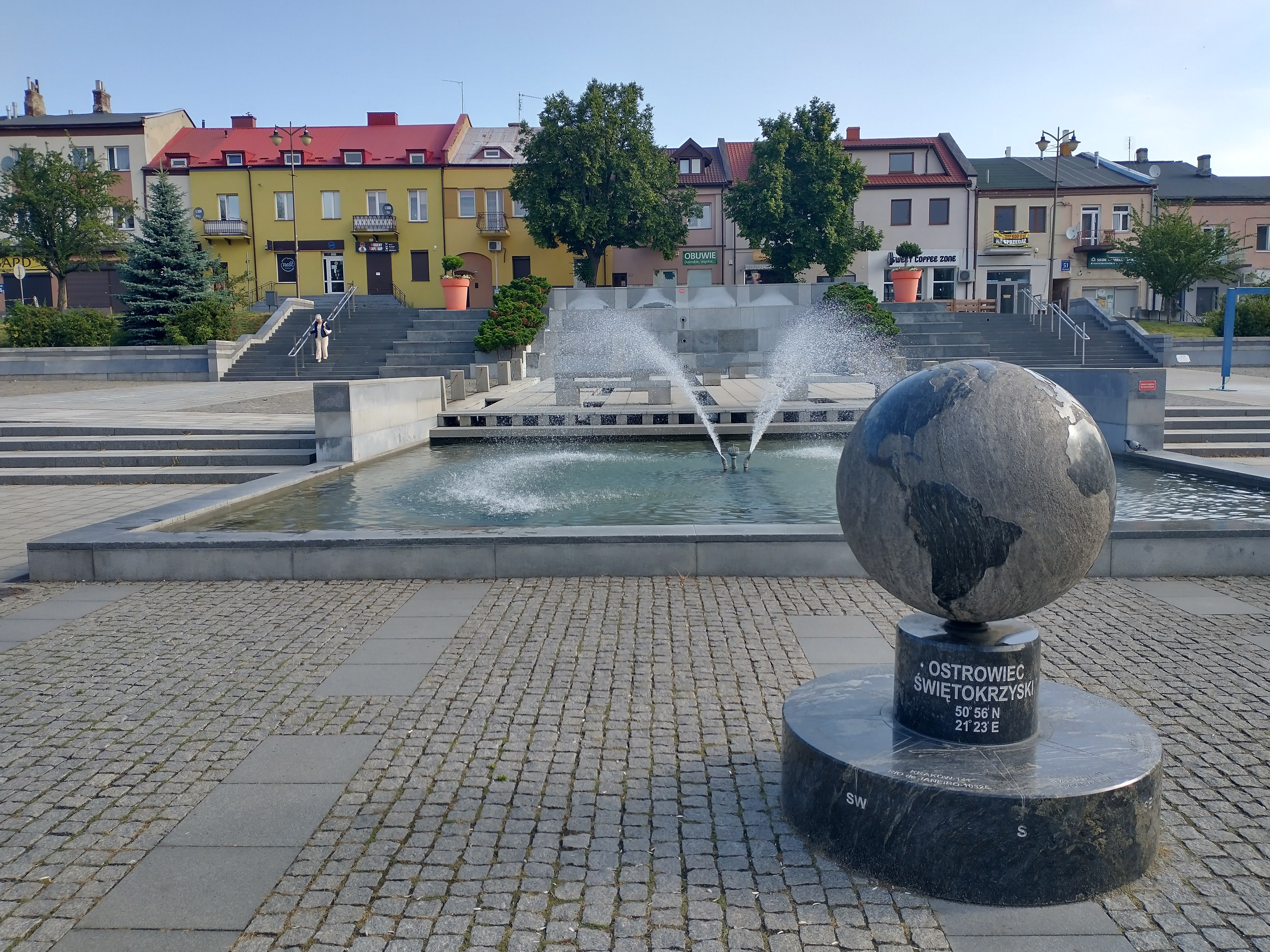
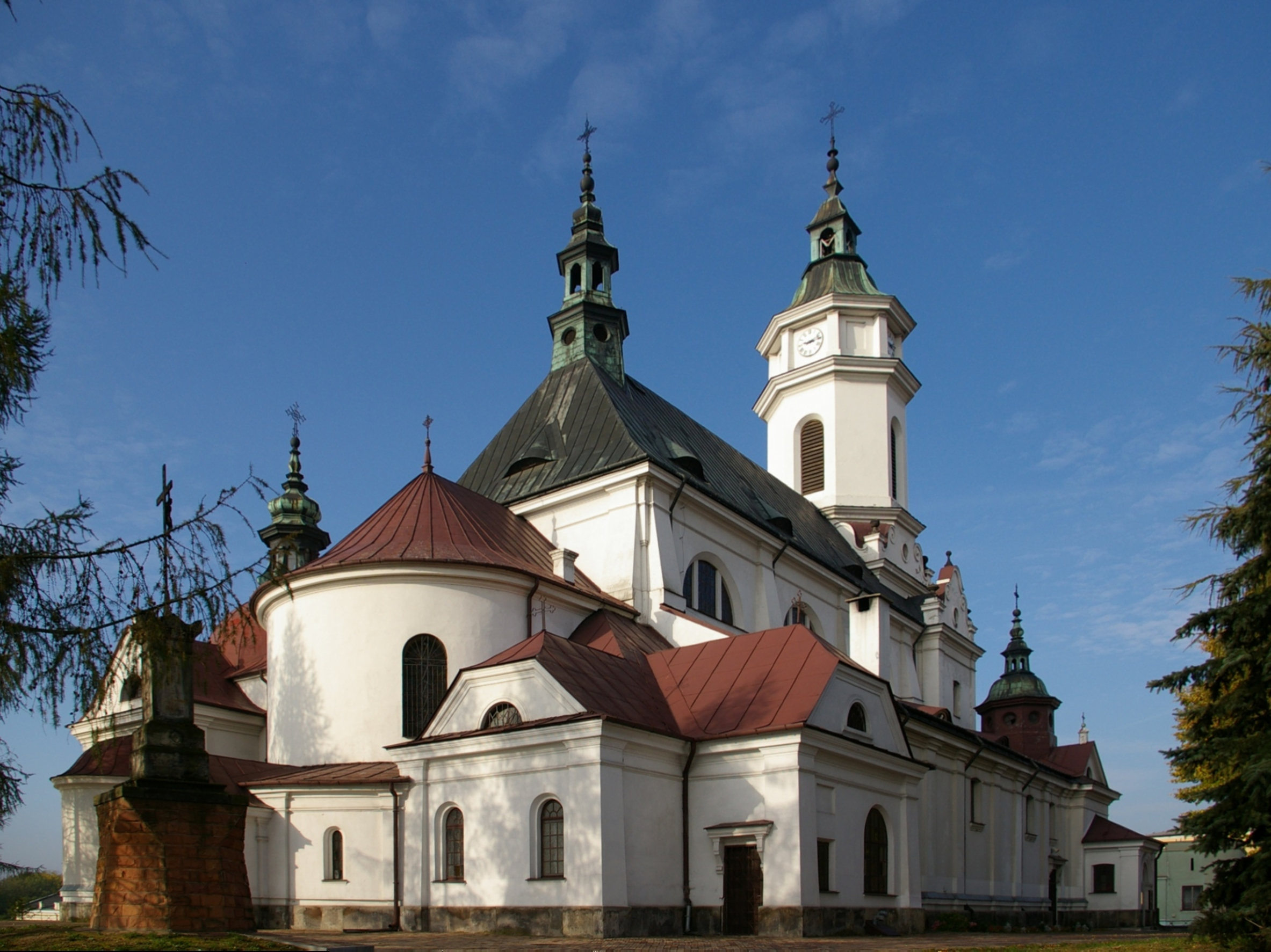
- Aerial view Market square Collegiate church

- Coat of arms
- Interactive map of Ostrowiec Świętokrzyski
- Location within Poland
- Coordinates: 50°56′N 21°24′E
- Country: Poland
- Voivodeship: Świętokrzyskie
- County: Ostrowiec
- Gmina: Ostrowiec Świętokrzyski (urban gmina)
- City rights: 1613

Government
  - Mayor: Artur Łakomiec (Ind.)

Area
  - Total: 46.43 km^{2} (17.93 sq mi)

Population (31 December 2021)
  - Total: 66,258 ▲
  - Density: 1,427/km^{2} (3,696/sq mi)
- Time zone: UTC+1 (CET)
  - Summer (DST): UTC+2 (CEST)
- Postal code: 27-400
- Area code: +48 41
- Car plates: TOS
- Website: ostrowiec.pl

Ostrowiec Świętokrzyski (Polish: [ɔˈstrɔvjɛt͡s ɕfjɛntɔˈkʂɨskʲi]), often referred to as Ostrowiec, is a city in southeastern Poland, in the historical region of Lesser Poland, with 66,258 residents (as of 2021). The city is one of the historic centers of Polish industry and metallurgy, and was part of the Old-Polish Industrial Region, the oldest industrial basin of the country.

Ostrowiec is the capital of Ostrowiec Świętokrzyski County, part of Świętokrzyskie Voivodeship.

Ostrowiec lies on the Kamienna river. Its northern districts are located in the Iłża Foothills, while the southern part belongs to the Opatów Upland. The Świętokrzyskie Mountains lie a few kilometers away, southwest of Ostrowiec. There are two interesting places near Ostrowiec: the archaeological reserve at Krzemionki (a UNESCO World Heritage Site and Historic Monument of Poland) and dinosaur park in Bałtów.

Ostrowiec is located at the intersection of National Road No. 9 (part of European route E371), and local roads 751, 754, 755. Furthermore, since 1884 the city has had a rail connection, along electrified rail line No. 25, which goes from Łódź Kaliska to Dębica. In the 1960s, the Polish government planned construction of a rail line from Kielce to Lublin via Ostrowiec. The area of the city is 46 km^{2} (18 sq mi), and it is divided into 20 osiedla.

== History ==
=== Early history ===
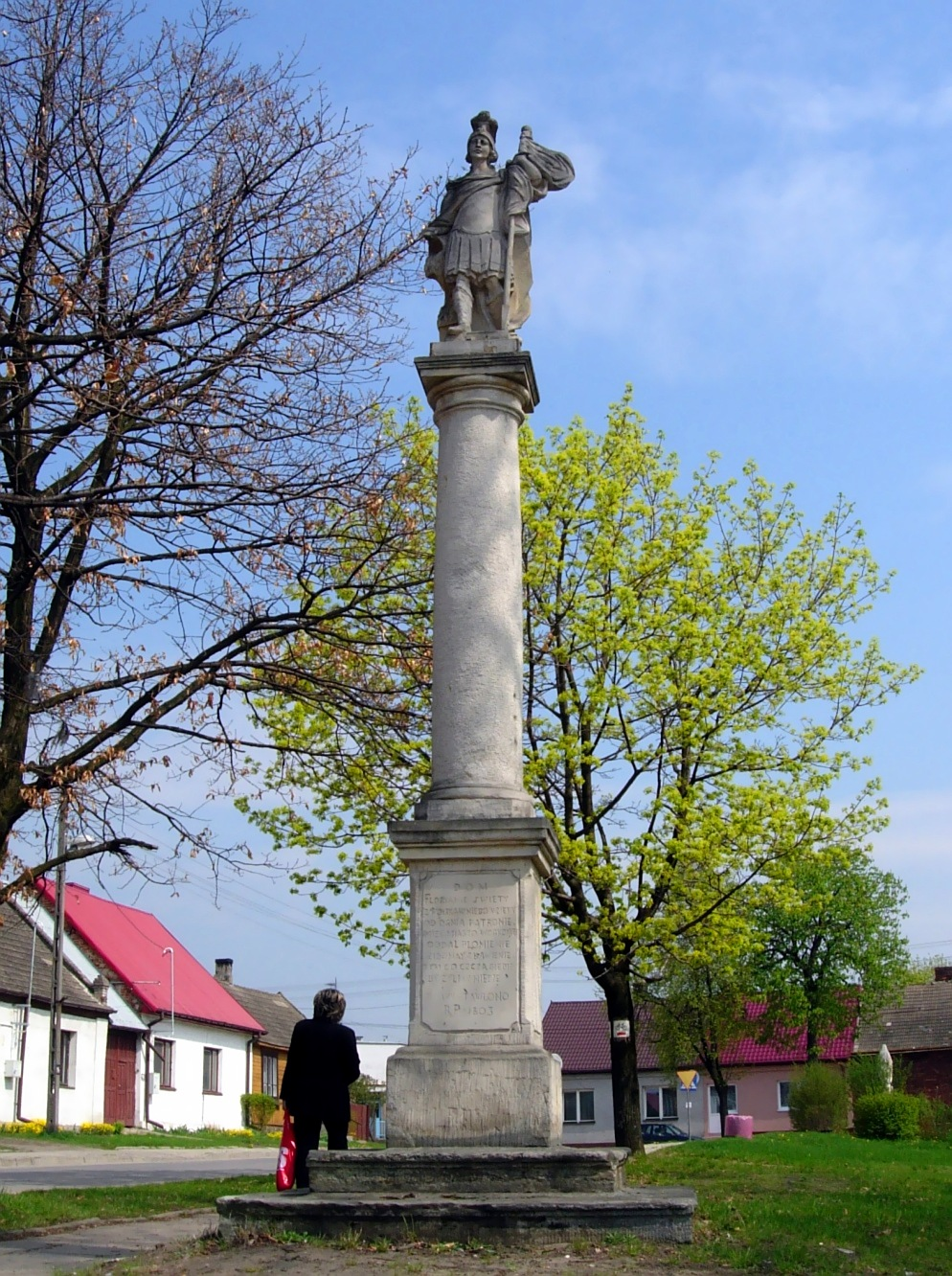
Statue of Saint Florian in Denków

The oldest testimonies of human habitation date back to the Stone Age (ca 4000 BC). At that time, there were nomadic tribes belonging to, among others, the Lengyel and Globular Amphora cultures. They came here from Danube river region.

The earliest documents about Ostrowiec village, that gave beginning to the contemporary Ostrowiec Świętokrzyski come from the 14th century. At that time the village was called Ostrow, and was located on the right bank of the Kamienna. In the early 16th century, a local nobleman Kacper Maciejewski tried to establish here a town, but failed to do so. In 1564 town charter was granted to the settlement of Denków (also called Wielki Michów), which is now one of the Ostrowiec districts. Denków was a private town, administratively located in the Sandomierz County in the Sandomierz Voivodeship in the Lesser Poland Province of the Kingdom of Poland.

The town itself, at that time part of Sandomierz Voivodeship, was built from scratch in 1597 by Jakub Gawroński of Rawa coat of arms on the left bank of the Kamienna river, situated in the Vistula river basin. It received town privileges in 1613. It became a property of Janusz Ostrogski, a statesman and one of the richest magnates of the Polish–Lithuanian Commonwealth. Later it belonged to many Polish aristocratic families: Tarnowski family, Czartoryski family, Lubomirski family, Radziwiłł family, Zasławski family, Sanguszko family, Wielopolski family, Dobrzański family, Łubieński family.

=== Industrialization ===
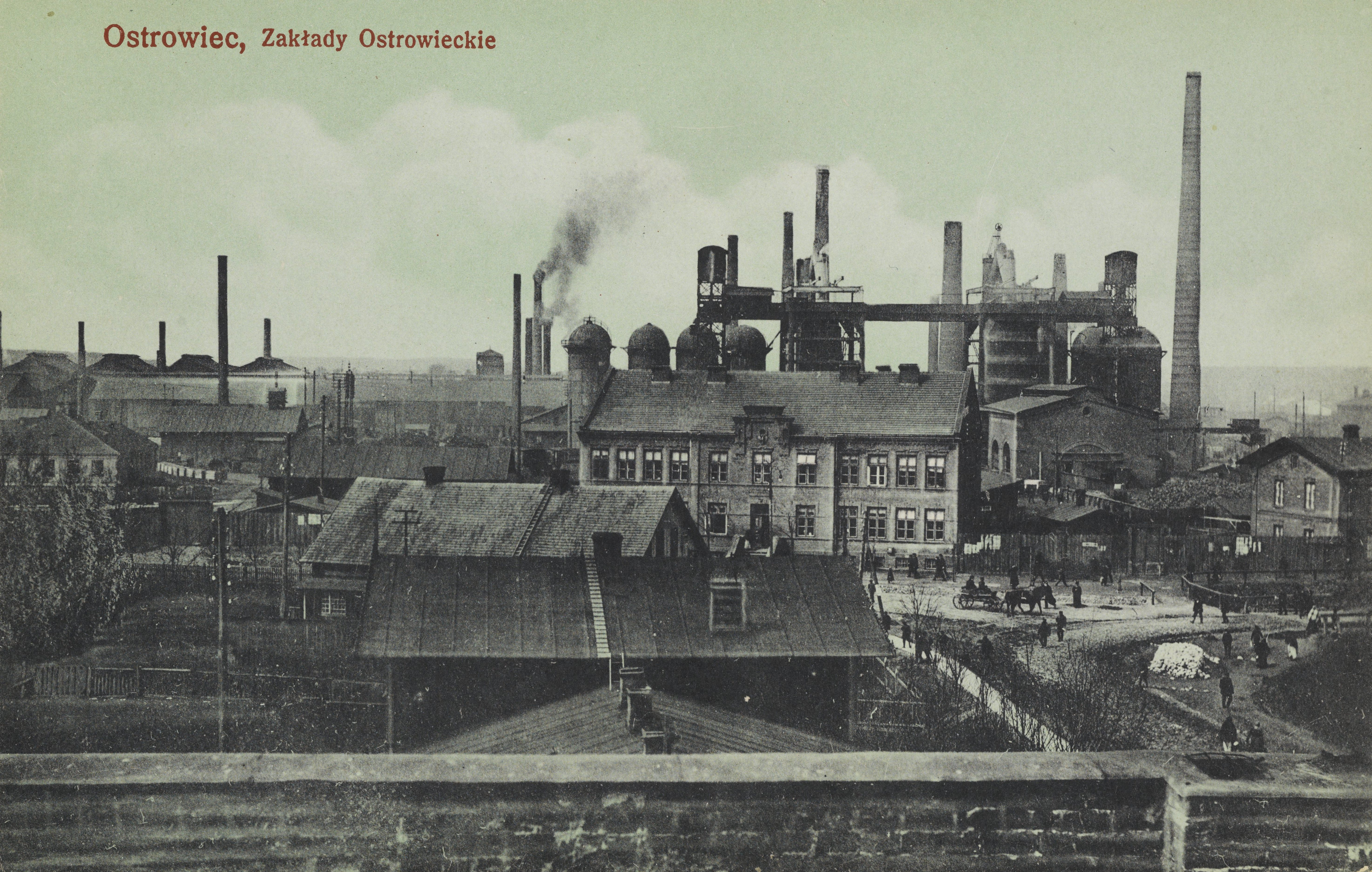
Ostrowiec Works in the early 20th century

In the late 18th and early 19th centuries, Ostrowiec emerged as a main center of Polish industry. Following the idea of Stanisław Staszic, who promoted industrialization of the Kamienna river valley, based on local deposits of coal and iron ore, numerous plants were opened in the area. In 1837 - 1839, the Klimkiewicz Steelworks was opened (named after its founder Antoni Klimkiewicz), which later came to be known as the Ostrowiec Works (Zaklady Ostrowieckie). The plant became the second largest in Congress Poland, and in its vicinity, various enterprises were opened, together with workers establishment.

Ostrowiec was one of main centers of the Revolution in the Kingdom of Poland (1905–1907). On 27 December 1905 the so-called Ostrowiec Republic was established, and for two weeks, the town and the county were ruled by the Polish Socialist Party, headed by Ignacy Boerner. The Republic was ended after the arrival of two infantry regiments of the Imperial Russian Army. The Ostrowiec Works was severely damaged during World War I, and on 3 November 1918 newly established Polish authorities took control over Ostrowiec. In the Second Polish Republic Ostrowiec developed, due to its location in Central Industrial Area. The town belonged to Opatow County, and before World War II its population was app. 30,000. In 1937 it was officially named Ostrowiec Swietokrzyski. Earlier on, the names Ostrowiec Kielecki and Ostrowiec nad Kamienna had been used.

=== World War II ===
During the German invasion of Poland, which started World War II, the Wehrmacht captured the city on 8 September 1939. Afterwards it was occupied by Germany and included within the Radom District of the General Government, formed of German-occupied central Poland. In 1940 the Germans carried out mass arrests of Poles as part of the AB-Aktion. Poles arrested in March were either deported to Nazi concentration camps or massacred in Góry Wysokie, while those arrested in June were imprisoned and tortured in Skarżysko-Kamienna and then murdered in a forest near Skarżysko-Kamienna. Germans carried out several executions and massacres in the city. On 30 September 1942, 29 Poles, including merchants, teachers and local officials, were hanged at the Market Square. In 1944, the Germans poured corrosive substances into their mass grave in attempt to cover up the crime. Most of the city's Jewish community of app. 11,000 was murdered in the Holocaust in 1943–1944.

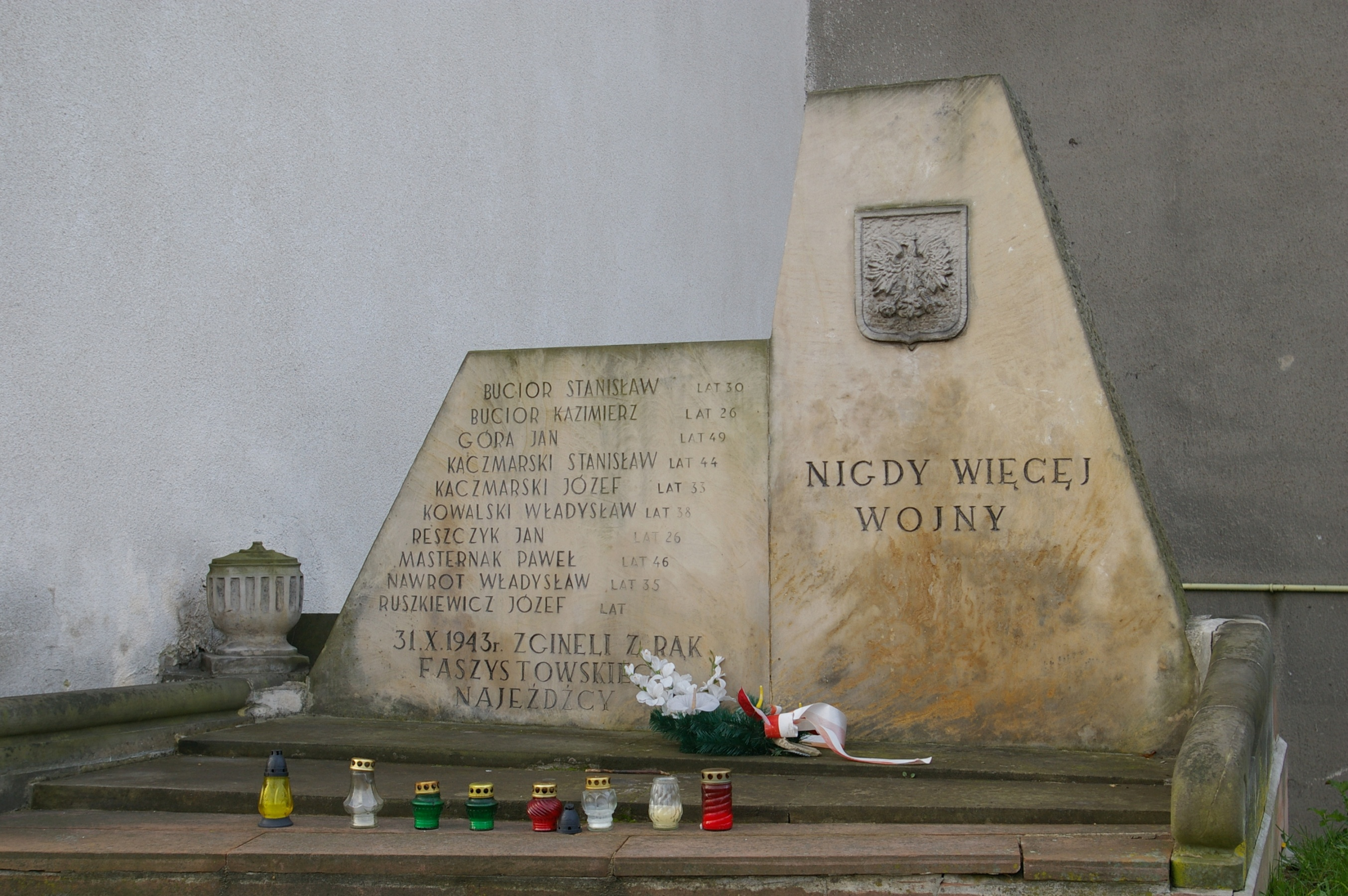
Memorials at the sites of a German-perpetrated massacre of Poles of 31 October 1943

Ostrowiec was a lively centre of the Polish resistance movement. There was underground weapons production. The Home Army published three local underground newspapers in Ostrowiec, and also other underground newspapers from Sandomierz and Kielce were distributed in Ostrowiec. Local sports clubs continued their activities underground. The underground University of the Western Lands gave secret lectures in Ostrowiec. The Polish resistance carried out acts of sabotage to disrupt German industrial production. The Union of Retaliation blew up a blast furnace in April 1942, and destroyed a railroad bridge in September 1942, causing interruptions in gas supplies and a halt to industrial production. In July 1943, the Home Army took control of one of the factories. Polish workers carried out acts of sabotage in the factories, and those at risk of arrest fled and joined partisan units in the surrounding forests. A very significant action carried out by the local Polish underground was the kidnapping of the German city commissioner Bruno Motschall. In 1943, Motschall was kidnapped in broad daylight in the city center by a Home Army unit in his own car. The Poles fled towards the nearby village of Chmielów. A German pursuit group of 60 people followed the car. Because of a car defect, the kidnappers were caught up in Chmielów, where a shootout ensued, which resulted in three Poles being killed. German troops withdraw westwards on 16 January 1945.

=== Recent period ===
Ostrowiec continued its development in the postwar period. It was administratively located in the Kielce Voivodeship until 1998. In 1954, several villages were annexed, including Denków, which itself had once been a town. In the 1970s, a new metallurgical plant was opened. In the 1990s, the metallurgical industry experienced a big crisis. The steel plant was bought in 2003 by the Spanish CELSA Group, which launched the forging of gun barrels in 2022. The city also accepted Ukrainian athletes after the Russian invasion.

In November 2026, local resident Michał Oksiński murdered three members of his family before committing the mass shooting in Kraków.

== Points of interest ==
Historic sights of Ostrowiec Świętokrzyski (examples)

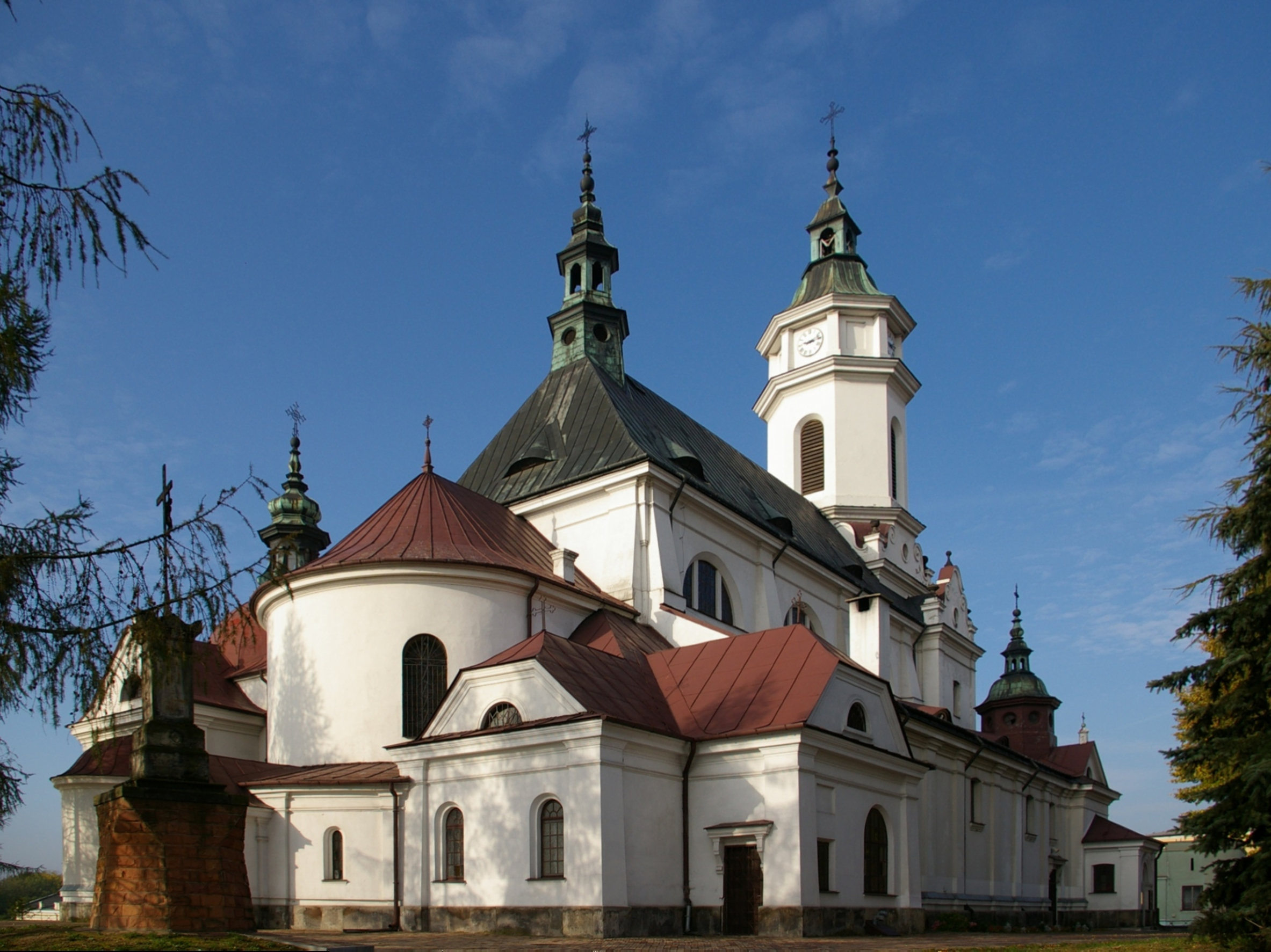
St. Michael's Collegiate church

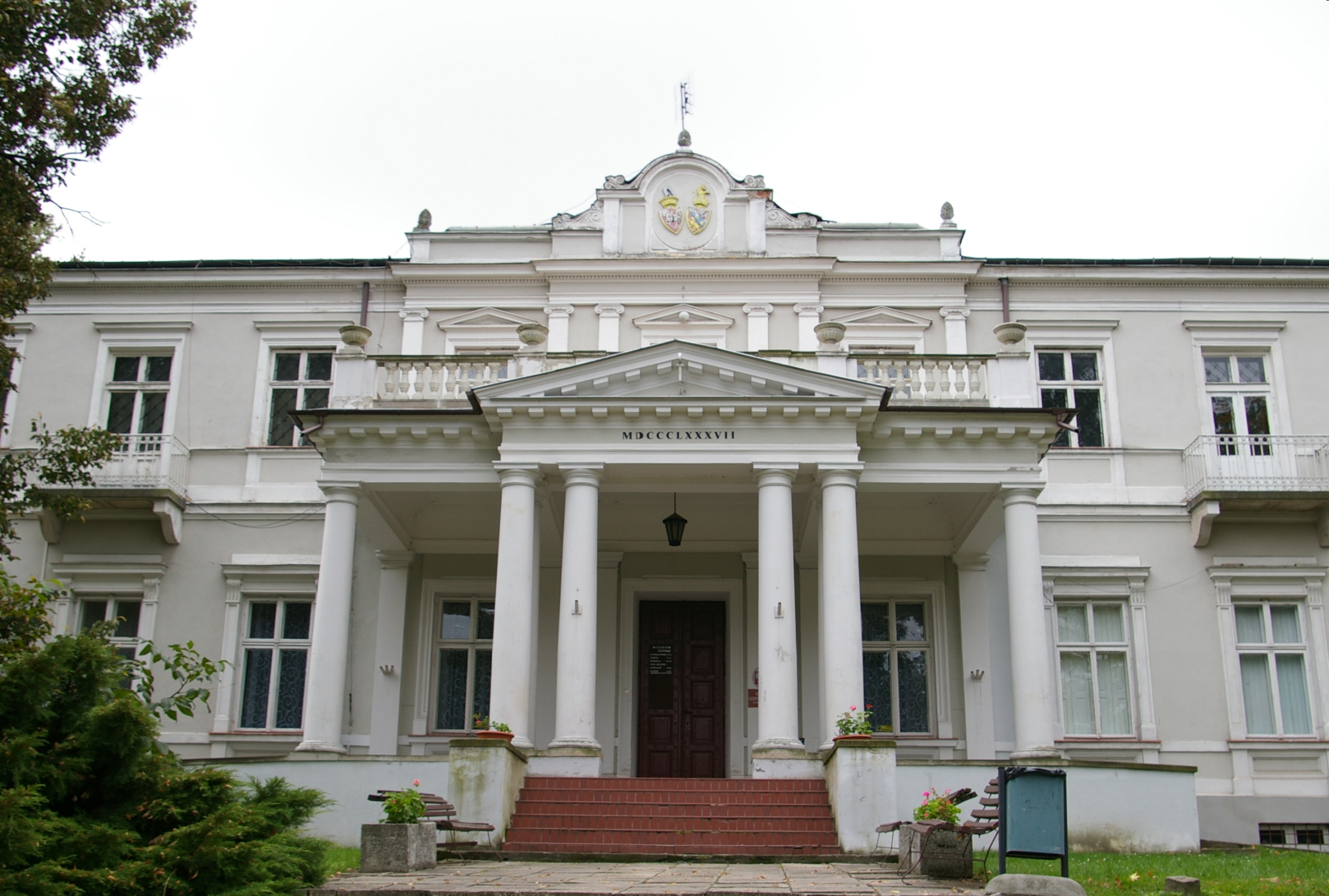
Wielopolski Palace (now housing the Historical and Archaeological Museum)

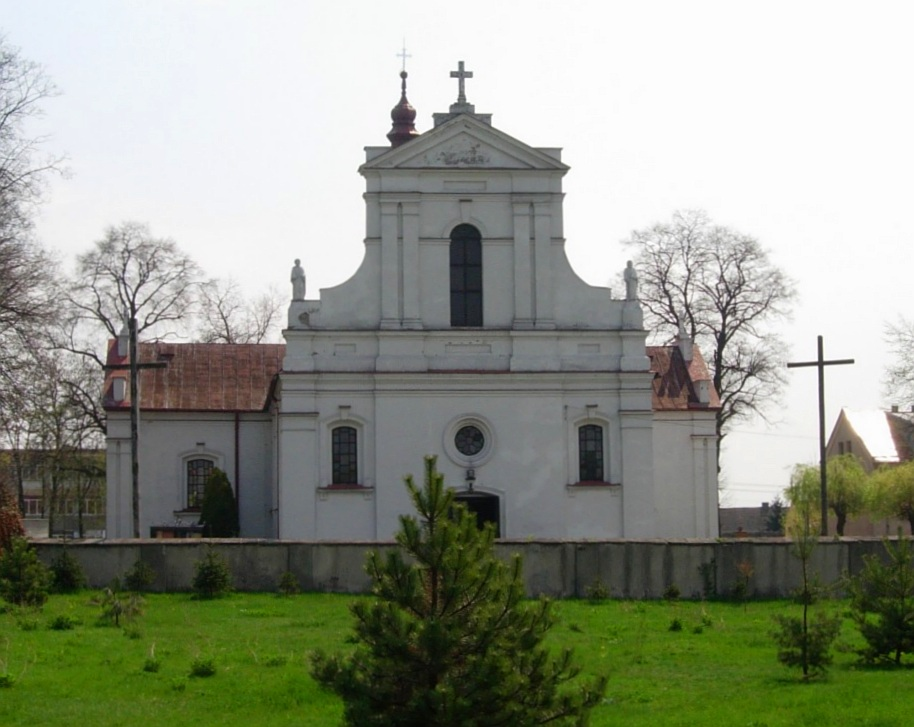
St. Stanislaus Church

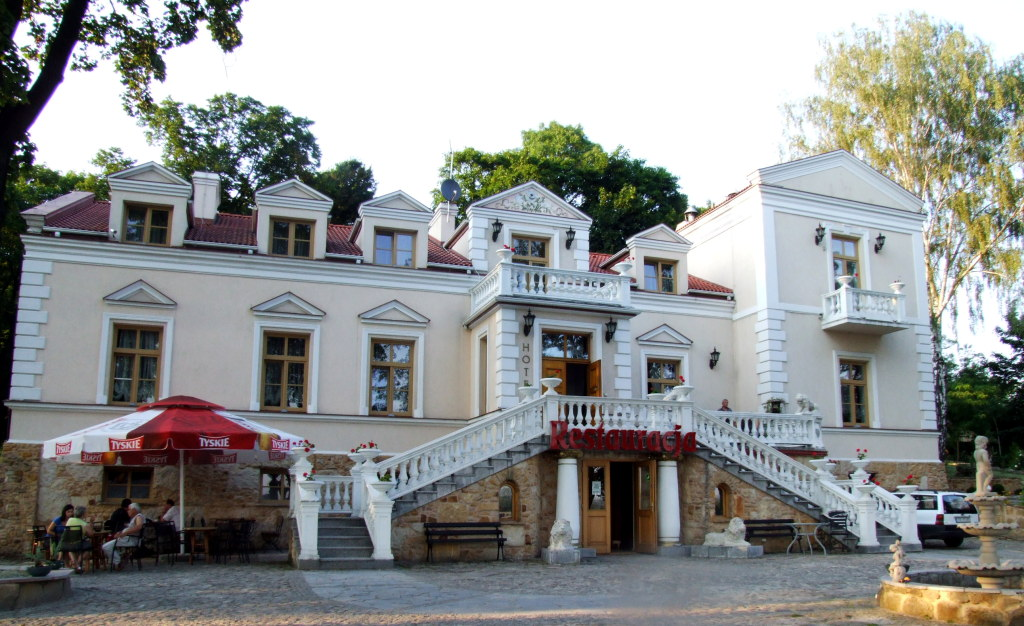
Wielopolski hunting palace

- Collegiate church of Michael the Archangel (early 17th century, remodelled in neo-Baroque style in 1924–1938),
- St. Stanislaus church in Denków (1700, with an 1806 bell tower),
- Wielopolski family park and palace in the district of Czestocice (1887–1899), now housing the Historical and Archaeological Museum
- Wielopolski family hunting palace, now a hotel
- Mountain style wooden church (1932),
- Remnants of a Jewish cemetery on a park hill,
- Late 19th century rail station,
- Post office (1925-1927),
- St. Florian roadside figure at St. Florian square (1776).
- Krzemionki Prehistoric Striped Flint Mining Region, a UNESCO World Heritage Site and Historic Monument of Poland, is located about eight kilometers north-east of the city

== Culture ==
Inhabitants of Ostrowiec are known to be involved in many culture and arts activities. The city has a variety of cultural institutions including:

- Municipal Cultural Centre
- Office of Artistic Exhibitions
- The Museum of History and Anthropology with a forest reserve in Krzemionki
- Public Library – has locations in different parts of the city
- Houses of Culture – children can get involved in the dance classes, drama classes, classes of art and modelling etc.; literature and general knowledge competitions are also organized.

Ostrowiec Świętokrzyski also boasts a musical school and the State Artistic Centre, both of which have had an important influence upon the cultural development of the city.

== Education ==
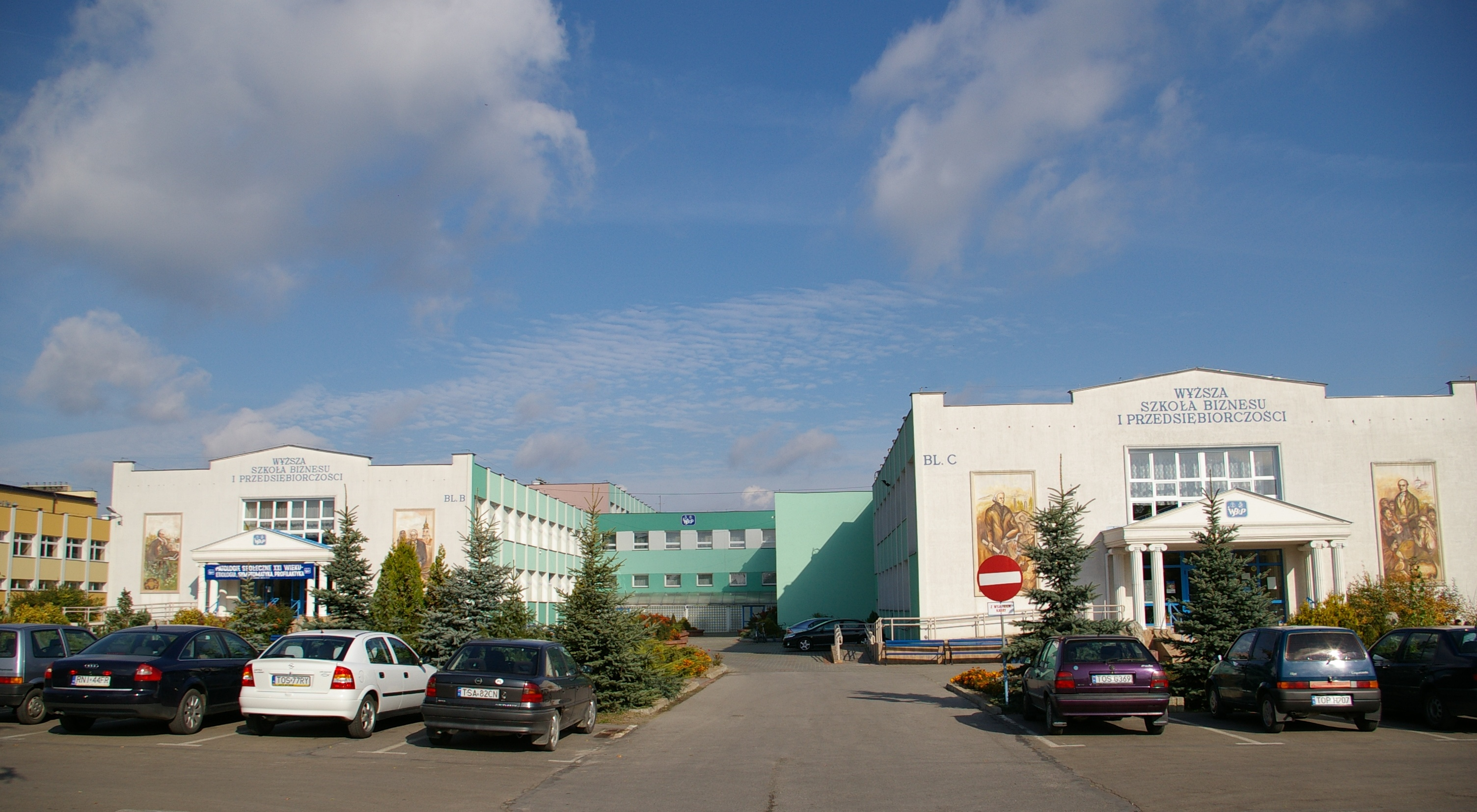
College of Business and Entrepreneurship

- Wyższa Szkoła Biznesu i Przedsiębiorczości (College of Business and Entrepreneurship in Ostrowiec Świętokrzyski)
- Catholic High School http://www.klo.ostrowiec.pl

== Sports ==
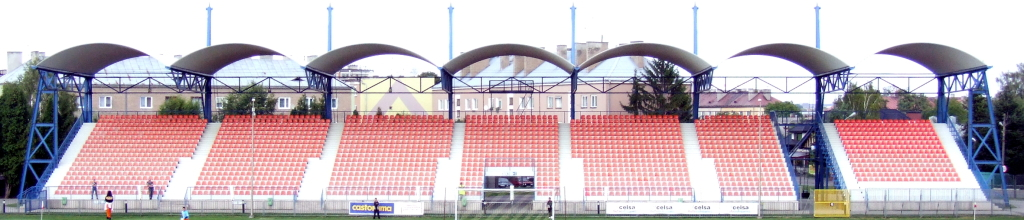
KSZO Municipal Sports Stadium

- KSZO Ostrowiec Świętokrzyski - football team, playing in the lower divisions; formerly playing in the top division
- KSZO Ostrowiec Świętokrzyski - handball team, playing in the I liga
- KSZO Ostrowiec Świętokrzyski - water polo team, playing in the Ekstraklasa, Poland's top division, as of 2026–27, nine times Polish Water Polo Champions.

== Notable people ==
- Mirosław Baka (born 1963), Polish actor
- David Beigelman (1887–1945), Polish-Jewish violinist, orchestra leader, composer of Yiddish theatre music
- Ben Berger (1897–1988), Polish-Jewish American owner of the Minnesota Lakers (later Los Angeles Lakers)
- Kazimierz Cichowski (1887-1937), Polish-Soviet communist activist, politician
- Alicja Dąbrowska (born 1956), Polish politician, member of the Sejm (2007–2019)
- Tomasz Dymanowski (born 1973), Polish footballer
- Dziarma (born 1997), Polish singer
- Piotr Gierczak (born 1976), Polish footballer, manager
- Meir Yechiel Halstock (1852–1928), Hassidic rabbi
- Mariusz Jop (born 1978), Polish footballer, manager
- Anna Kędzierska (1932–2020), Polish politician, Minister of Internal Trade and Services (1984–1985)
- Andrzej Kobylański (born 1970), Polish footballer
- Kamil Kosowski (born 1977), Polish footballer, pundit
- Rafał Lasocki (born 1975), Polish footballer, manager
- Klaudiusz Łatkowski (born 1985), Polish footballer
- Krystyna Nowakowska (1935–2019), Polish athlete, Olympic participant
- Michał Oksiński (2002–2026), 2026 Kraków shooting perpetrator
- Zbigniew Pacelt (1951–2021), Polish athlete, Olympian, coach, sport official, politician, and member of the Sejm (2005–2015)
- Artur Patek (born 1965), Polish historian
- Włodek Pawlik (born 1958), Polish composer and jazz pianist, Grammy Award winner
- Jan Piwnik (1912–1944), Polish soldier, notable member of the Home Army during World War II
- Jan Rybkowski (1912–1987), Polish film director and screenwriter
- Anthony Sadowski (c. 1669–1736), Polish-American pioneer, trader, interpreter
- Piotr Skowron (born 1985), Polish computer scientist, researcher of artificial intelligence
- Paweł Strąk (born 1983), Polish footballer
- Danuta Straszyńska (born 1942), Polish athlete, Olympian
- Magdalena Swat (born 1991), Miss Universe Poland 2018
- Grzegorz Szymański (born 1978), Polish volleyball player
- Jerzy Tracz (born 1943), Polish Olympic swimmer
- Agnieszka Warchulska (born 1972), Polish actress
- Anna Wasilewska (1958–2021), Polish politician, member of the Sejm (2015–2021)

== Twin towns – sister cities ==
Ostrowiec Świętokrzyski is twinned with the following cities:

- Bila Tserkva, Ukraine
- Gennevilliers, France
- Scunthorpe, United Kingdom
- Pineto, Italy
- Bekabad, Uzbekistan
