= Battle of Khyriv =

- Part of Polish–Ukrainian War
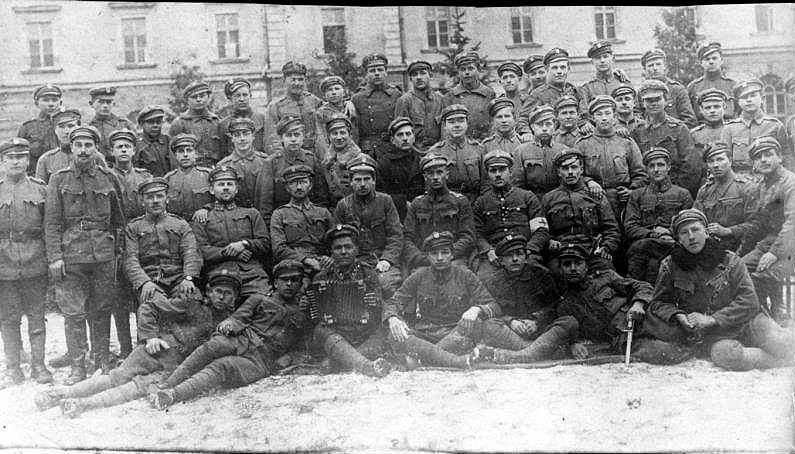
- Polish volunteers in front of the Jesuit School in Chyrów
Date	December 5 – 16, 1918
Location	Khyriv, Eastern Galicia
Result	Polish victory

Belligerents
Poland	West Ukrainian People's Republic

Commanders and leaders
Lieutenant Dudziński; Zygmunt Zieliński	Antin Kravs

Units involved
Polish Military Organization	Ukrainian Galician Army

The Battle of Khyriv was a battle of the Polish–Ukrainian War that took place on December 5 to December 16, 1918 between the Polish Military Organization and the Ukrainian Galician Army.

== The Battle ==
The city of Khyriv (Polish: Chyrów) was important in capturing Przemyśl, so both sides tried to gain control over it. From the first days of November, a Polish armored train operated on the section of the Zagórz-Ustrzyki Dolne–Krościenko–Chyrów railway. After the loss of Przemyśl, Khyriv was the main railway station of the Western Ukrainian People's Republic on the Hungarian-Galician railway, from which it was possible to control the Przemyśl–Zagórz railway, for Poles the station was important to create a second supply line for the besieged defenders of Lwów, aside from the main line from Przemyśl of the former Galician Railway of Archduke Charles Louis using the Galician Transversal Railway. On November 25, Polish troops under the command of Lieutenant Dudzińsky with 2 artillery batteries moved to Niżankowice (Ukrainian: Nyzhankovychi), Ukrainian forces retreated outside Khyriv. After the capture on November 26 by the Polish forces of Rava-Ruska, as well as the railway junction of Khyriv south of Lviv, the situation of the UGA has become much more complicated. The Poles immediately gained a significant strategic position from Khyriv and Rava-Ruska threatening both wings of the front. For the Polish side, the capture of Khyriv made it possible to supply the Przemyśl-Lviv railway, while at the same time eliminating the possibility of a Ukrainian counterattack on Przemyśl.

Ukrainian forces launched an offensive through Felsztyn (Skelivka) and Grodowice (Horodovychi) on Posada Chyrowska (Posada Khyrivska) and Chyrów (Khyriv). The battle captured Posada, after a short but fierce battle, by storming the station and the city of Khyriv on December 5, despite the fact that its number was twice smaller than the Polish forces.

Khyriv was captured by a group of Colonel Antin Kravs with two armored trains from Sambor (Sambir). Later in the battle, an enemy shell exploded in the boiler of an armored steamer, killing the fireman; he was buried in Sambor with military honors. Polish forces withdrew from Khyriv to Starzawa (Staryava) and Dobromil (Dobromyl). A night offensive was then organized, and in the late evening occupying Dobromil, at the end of the day Nowe Miasto (Nove Misto). In the morning, a hundred lieutenants Anton Tarnavsky joined the Ukrainian forces in Dobromil.

Two days later, with an order for a further attack on Niżankowice and Przemyśl; a hundred of lieutenant Tarnavsky and a hundred of chetar (platoon-leader) Kapenis marched on Niżankowice, and a centurion Osyp Stanimir with a hundred of chetar Karavans crossed the village of Grochowce (Horohivtsi) through Hujsko (Hiysko) and Sierakośce (Serakiztsi), besieged the Grochowce fort and occupied it. The armored train of the chetar Sadlich operated in the direction of Ustrzyki, its crew blew up a railway bridge. The armored train supported Berezhnytsky's riflemen attack on Przemyśl. The Polish command concentrated the overwhelming forces there, including an armored trains. In the evening, the platoon of Karavan occupied Fort Optyń in Pikulice (Pikulychy), 2 kilometers from Przemyśl. The garrison under the cover of night retreated from Niżankowice to Przemyśl.

On December 8, Kravs received reinforcements – a kurin (400 bayonets), he attacked the enemy in the direction of Przemyśl and on December 9 was 1 km from this strategically important Polish city.

At the beginning of December, General Zygmunt Zelinsky became the head of the Przemyśl Military District; almost immediately he received an order to counterattack towards Chyrów and Sambor.

On December 11, a Polish counterattack took place near Grochowce and Hermanowice (Hermanovychi), the Ukrainian counterattack from Fredropol in the direction of Darowice (Darovychi) was repulsed by the Poles, the Ukrainian forces withdrew from Fredropol to the south and south-east. Since December 13, the Polish 2nd Regiment of the Podhale Rifles of Lieutenant Karol Matzenauer fought near Khyriv.

On December 13, Kravs received an order from the Supreme Command, which surprised him. This order, he wrote in his memoirs, "forbade the initiation of any offensive on Przemyśl." He was forced to stop the operation, under pressure from the enemy to retreat to previous positions, but then did not let the Poles advance further. In this area, Kravs formed a powerful group "Khyriv", which reliably held the front. Kravs considered the decision of the command to be wrong, as he was convinced that a successful strike by the main forces on Przemyśl would force the Poles to leave Lviv.

On December 15, 1918, a battle took place near Nyzhankovychi between Ukrainian and Polish armored trains, which proved unsuccessful for the Ukrainians, and the train retreated to Khyriv. The damage was so significant that the crew was forced to abandon it, the armored train fell into the hands of the enemy. After fighting on the outskirts of Khyriv, the Poles recaptured the city on December 16.

== Bibliography ==
- Combatant News
- Сокальщина. Book of Memory of Ukraine
- Wojna 1918–1919
- Walki o Przemyśl
