= Hureczko =

- Village
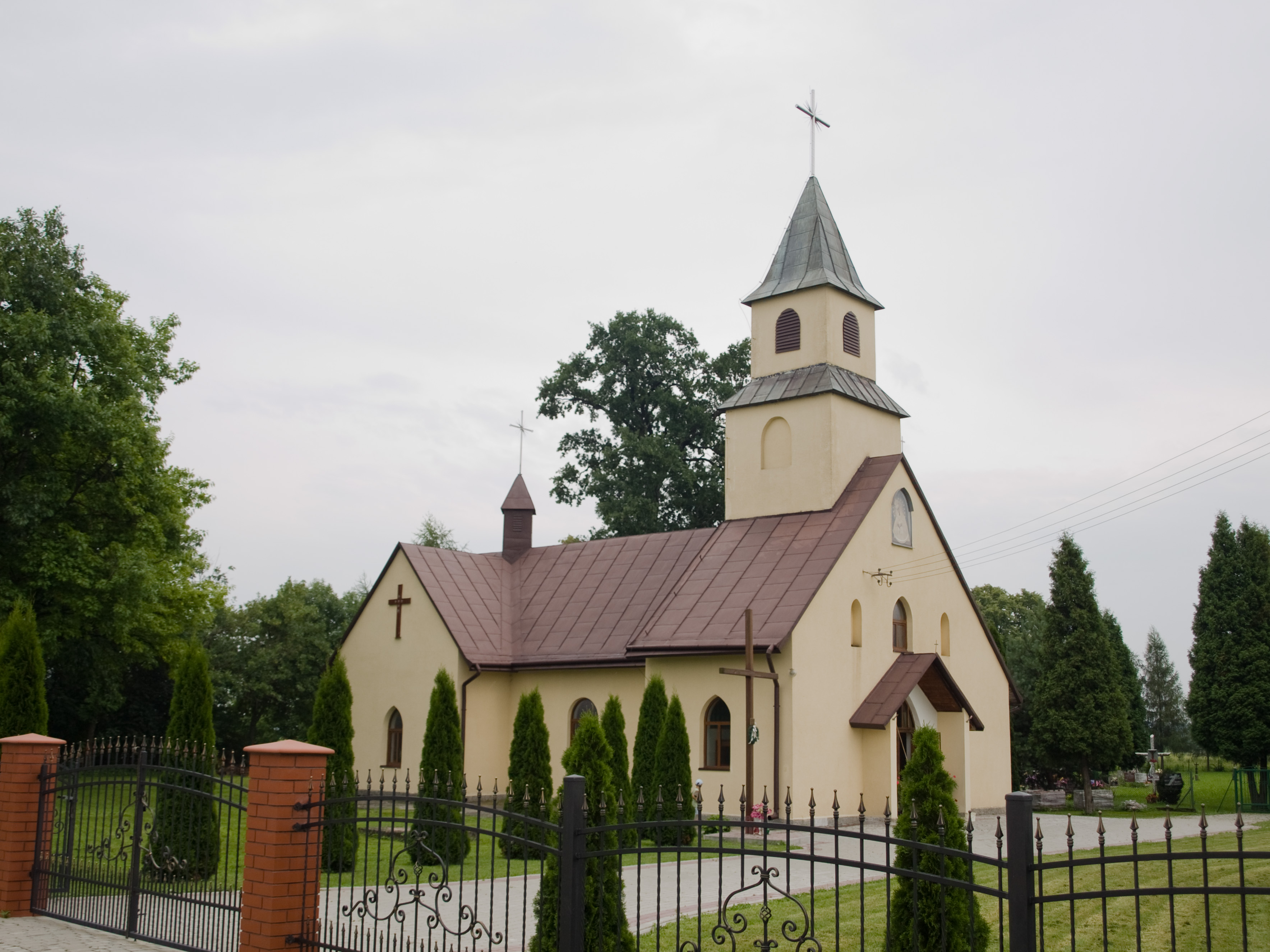
- Church of Our Lady of Ostra Brama

- Location within Poland
- Coordinates: 49°48′N 22°52′E
- Country: Poland
- Voivodeship: Subcarpathian
- County: Przemyśl
- Gmina: Medyka

Hureczko ([xuˈrɛt͡ʂkɔ]) is a village in the administrative district of Gmina Medyka, within Przemyśl County, Subcarpathian Voivodeship, in south-eastern Poland, close to the border with Ukraine.
