= Leszno, Podkarpackie Voivodeship =

Leszno
- Village
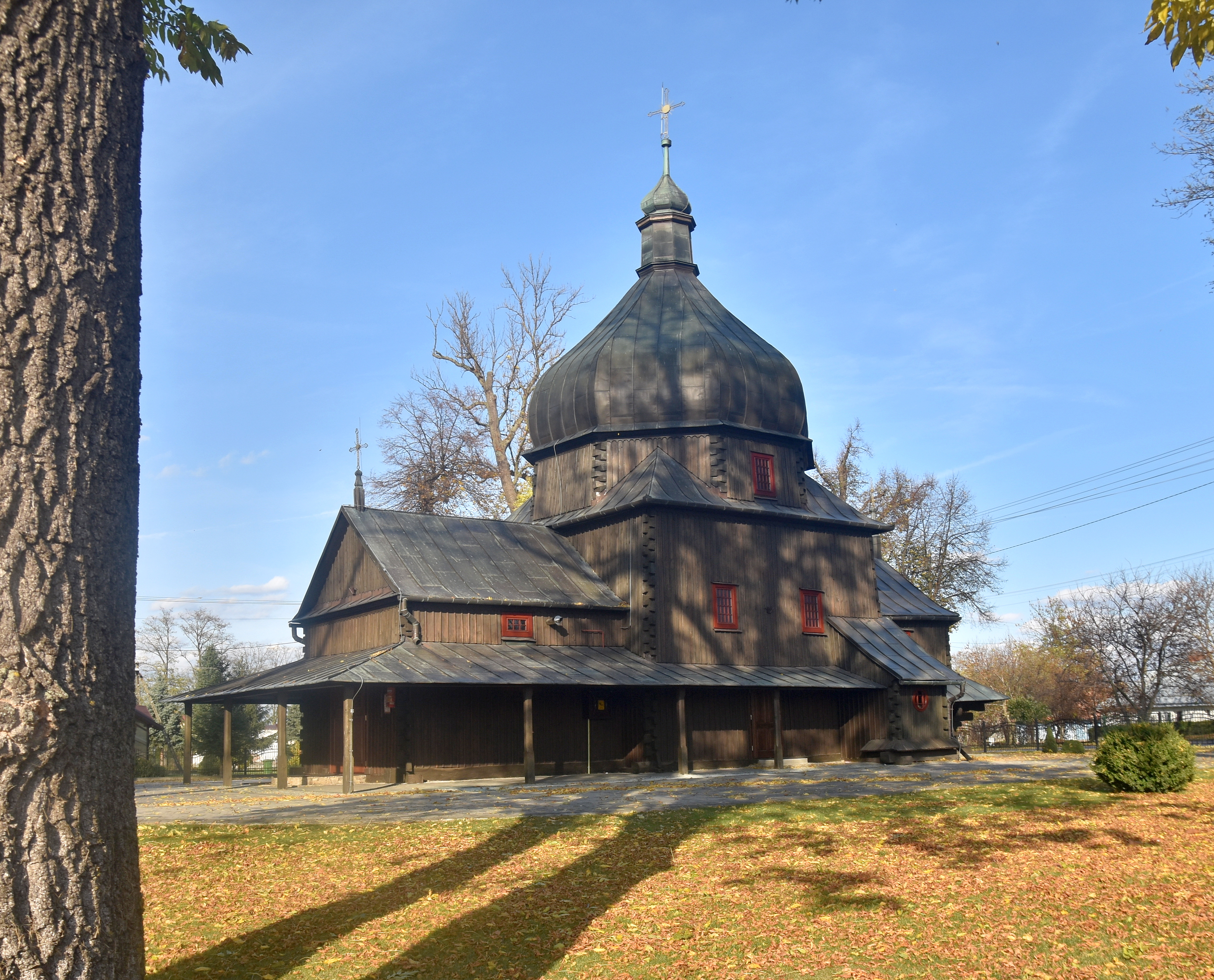
- Church of Saint Basil

- Location within Poland Location within Subcarpathian Voivodeship
- Coordinates: 49°51′N 22°57′E
- Country: Poland
- Voivodeship: Subcarpathian
- County: Przemyśl
- Gmina: Medyka

Population
  - Total: 670

Leszno ([ˈlɛʂnɔ]) is a village in the administrative district of Gmina Medyka, within Przemyśl County, Subcarpathian Voivodeship, in south-eastern Poland, close to the border with Ukraine.
