= Kupna =

- Village
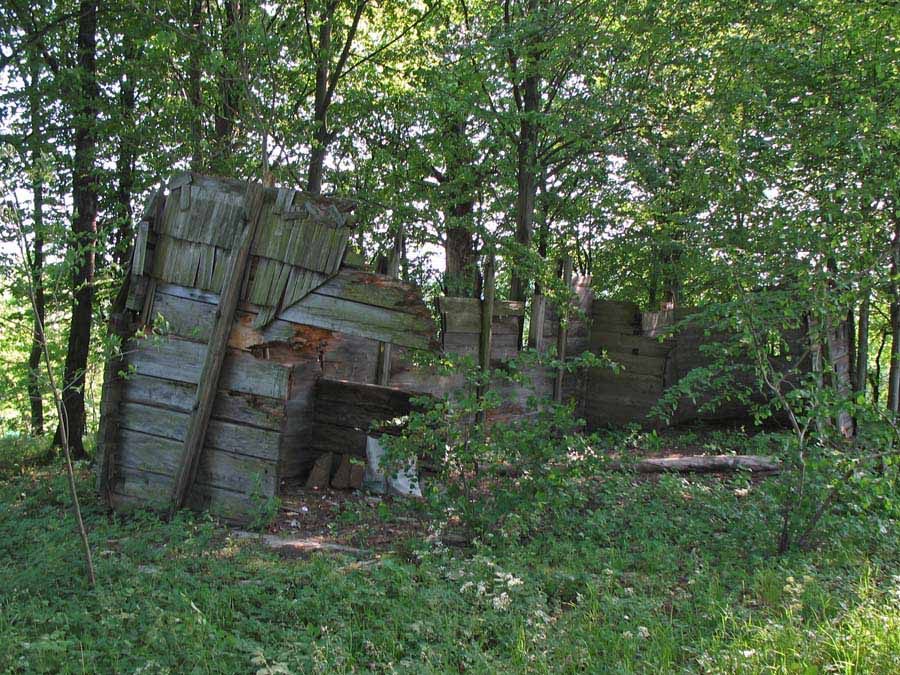
- Ruins of Greek Catholic church

- Location within Poland
- Coordinates: 49°46′N 22°34′E
- Country: Poland
- Voivodeship: Subcarpathian
- County: Przemyśl
- Gmina: Krzywcza

Kupna [ˈkupna] is a village in the administrative district of Gmina Krzywcza, within Przemyśl County, Subcarpathian Voivodeship, in south-eastern Poland.
