= Hurko =

- Village
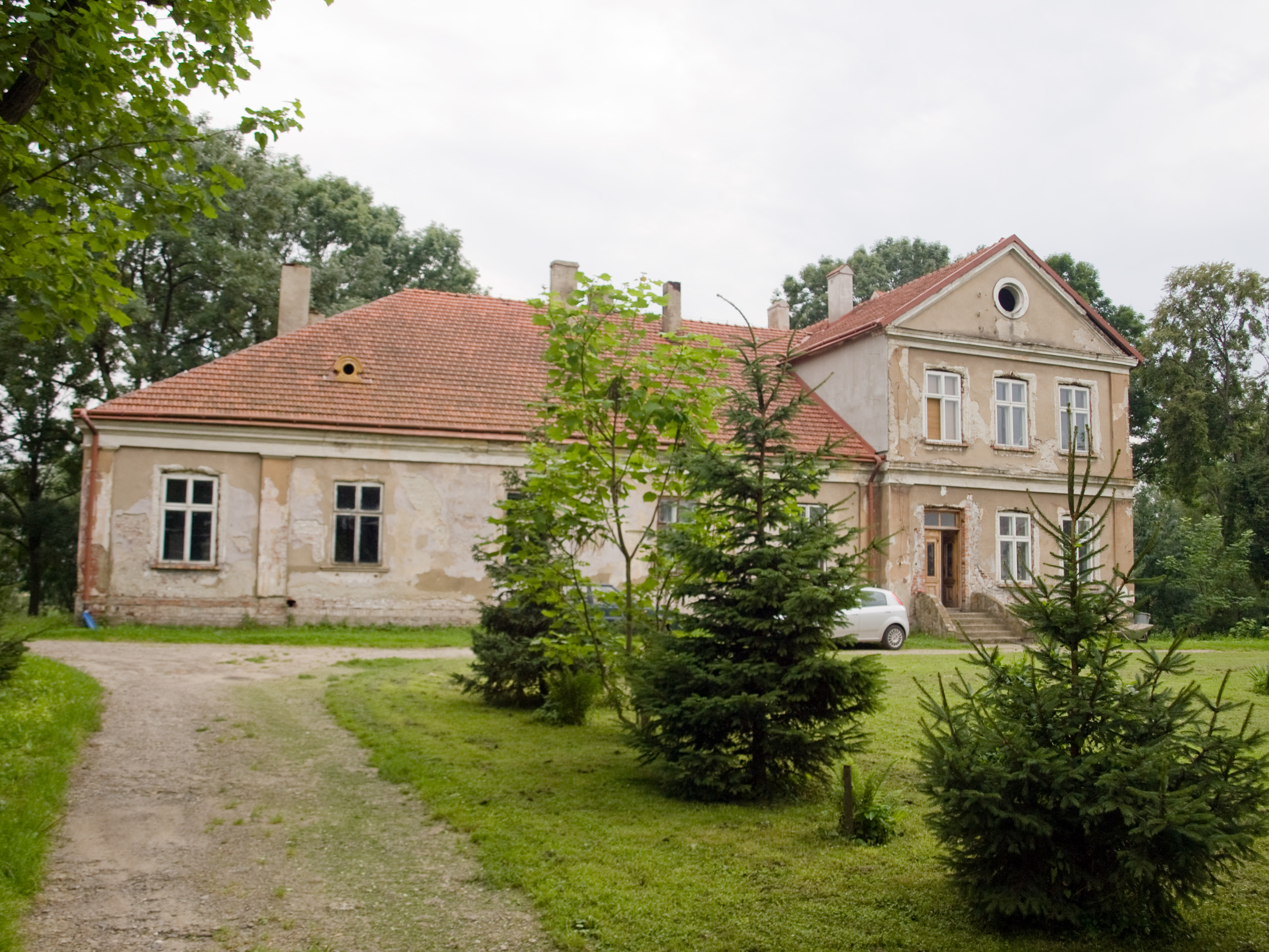
- Manor house
- Interactive map of Hurko
- Location within Poland
- Coordinates: 49°47′52″N 22°53′29″E
- Country: Poland
- Voivodeship: Subcarpathian
- County: Przemyśl
- Gmina: Medyka

Population
  - Total: 520

Hurko [ˈxurkɔ] is a village in the administrative district of Gmina Medyka, within Przemyśl County, Subcarpathian Voivodeship, in south-eastern Poland. It is close to the border with Ukraine.
