= Średnia, Podkarpackie Voivodeship =

Średnia
- Village
- Location within Poland
- Coordinates: 49°50′N 22°35′E
- Country: Poland
- Voivodeship: Subcarpathian
- County: Przemyśl
- Gmina: Krzywcza

Średnia [ˈɕrɛdɲa] is a village in the administrative district of Gmina Krzywcza, within Przemyśl County, Subcarpathian Voivodeship, in south-eastern Poland.
