= Kupiatycze =

- Village
- Location within Poland
- Coordinates: 49°42′N 22°47′E
- Country: Poland
- Voivodeship: Subcarpathian
- County: Przemyśl
- Gmina: Fredropol

Kupiatycze [kupjaˈtɨt͡ʂɛ] is a village in the administrative district of Gmina Fredropol, within Przemyśl County, Subcarpathian Voivodeship, in south-eastern Poland, close to the border with Ukraine.
