= Kormanice =

- Village
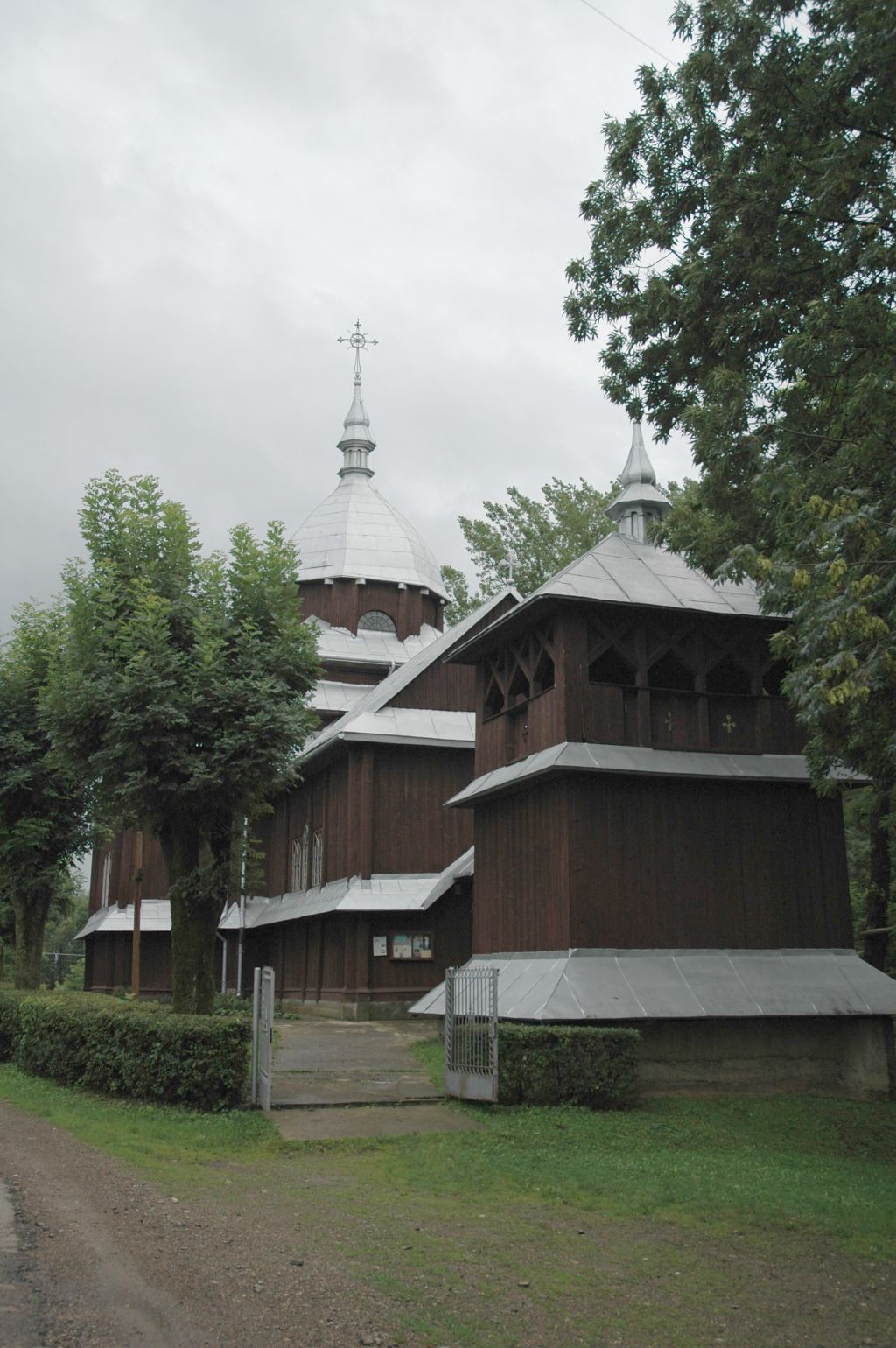
- Greek Catholic church

- Location within Poland
- Coordinates: 49°41′N 22°44′E
- Country: Poland
- Voivodeship: Subcarpathian
- County: Przemyśl
- Gmina: Fredropol

Kormanice [kɔrmaˈnit͡sɛ] is a village in the administrative district of Gmina Fredropol, within Przemyśl County, Subcarpathian Voivodeship, in south-eastern Poland, close to the border with Ukraine.
