= Kalwaria Pacławska =

- Village
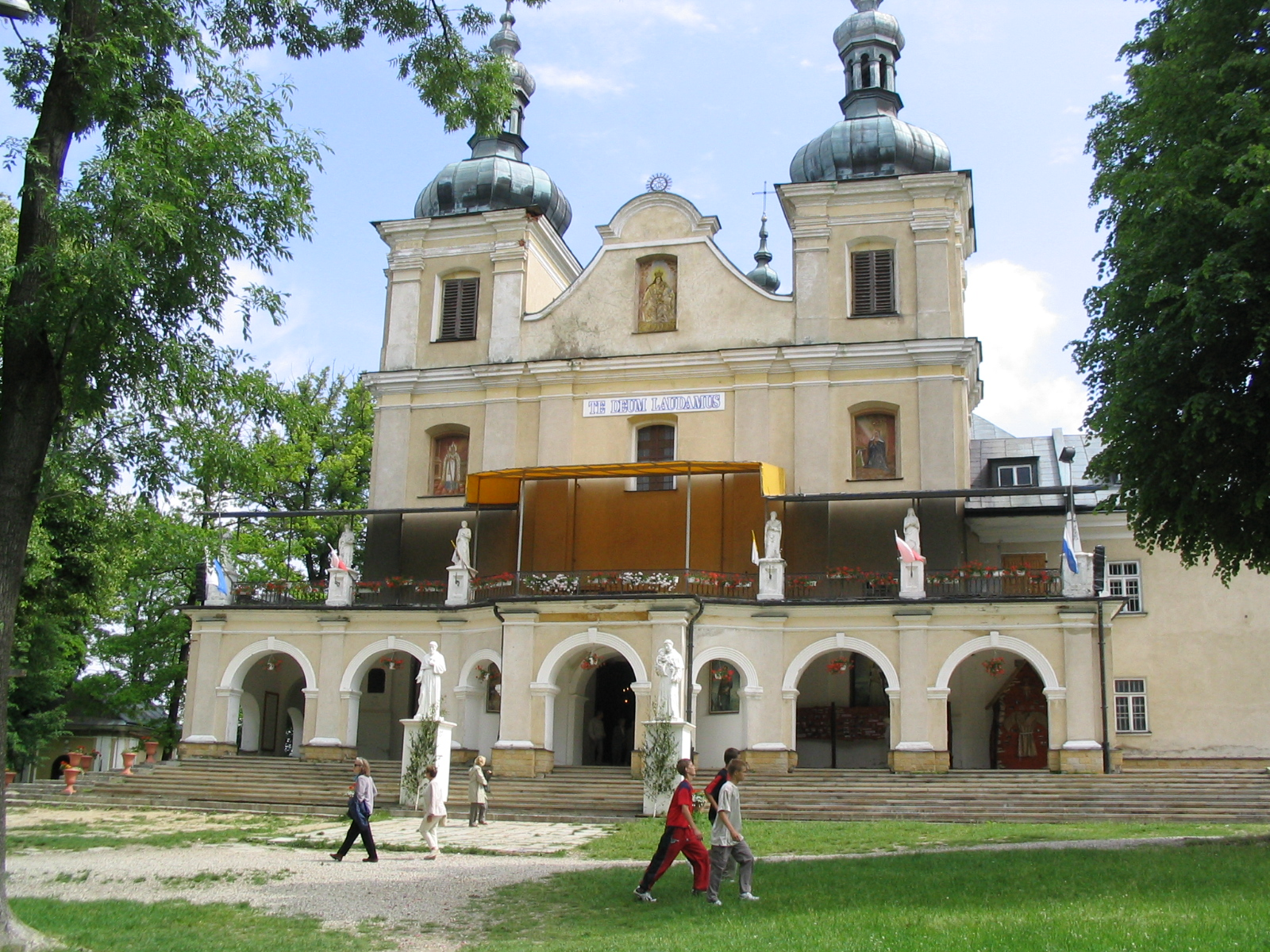
- Basilica of the Finding of the Holy Cross

- Location within Poland
- Coordinates: 49°37′54″N 22°42′22″E
- Country: Poland
- Voivodeship: Subcarpathian
- County: Przemyśl
- Gmina: Fredropol

Population
  - Total: 164

Kalwaria Pacławska (Polish: [kalˈvarja paˈt͡swafska]) is a village in the administrative district of Gmina Fredropol, within Przemyśl County, Subcarpathian Voivodeship, in south-eastern Poland, close to the border with Ukraine.

The village took its name from the big calvary that arose in the XIVth century around the Orthodox Church of Simeon Stylites. After the region fell into the control of Poland, it was transformed and developed as a Catholic religious center by Andrzej Maksymilian Fredro and became a popular pilgrimage site. It has also a miraculous image of Our Lady.
