= Sopotnik =

- Village
- Interactive map of Sopotnik
- Location within Poland
- Coordinates: 49°36′52″N 22°41′05″E
- Country: Poland
- Voivodeship: Subcarpathian
- County: Przemyśl
- Gmina: Fredropol

Sopotnik [sɔˈpɔtnik] is a village in the administrative district of Gmina Fredropol, within Przemyśl County, Subcarpathian Voivodeship, in south-eastern Poland, close to the border with Ukraine.
