= Babice, Podkarpackie Voivodeship =

Babice
- Village
- Location within Poland
- Coordinates: 49°49′N 22°28′E
- Country: Poland
- Voivodeship: Subcarpathian
- County: Przemyśl
- Gmina: Krzywcza
- Population: 310

Babice (Polish: [baˈbit͡sɛ]) is a village in the administrative district of Gmina Krzywcza, within Przemyśl County, Subcarpathian Voivodeship, in south-eastern Poland.
