= Młodowice =

- Village
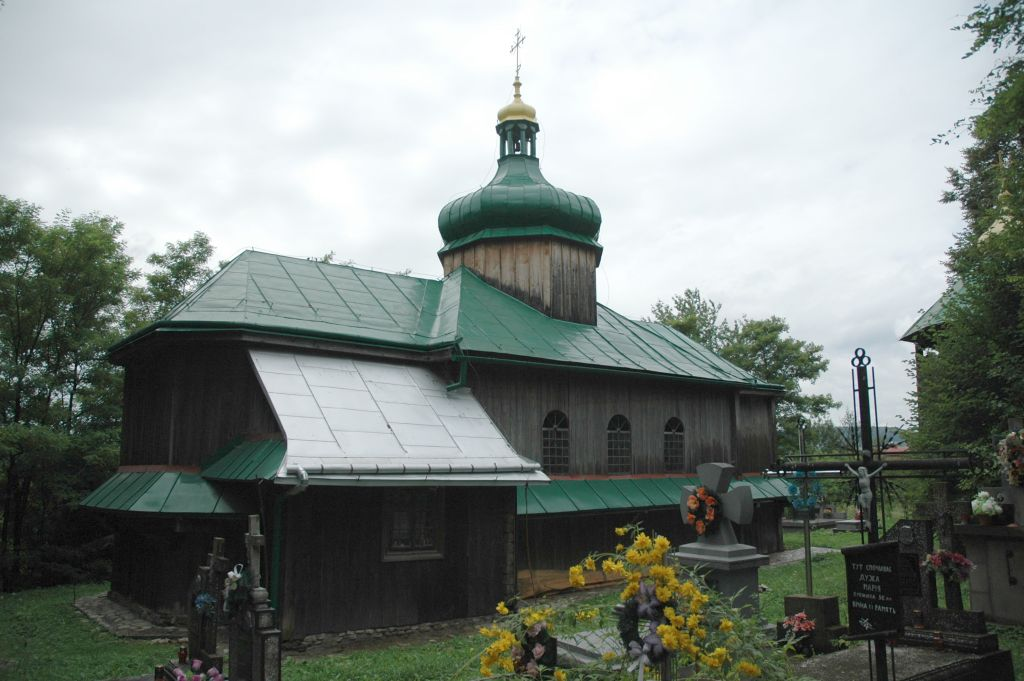
- Wooden church
- Interactive map of Młodowice
- Location within Poland
- Coordinates: 49°41′5″N 22°46′38″E
- Country: Poland
- Voivodeship: Subcarpathian
- County: Przemyśl
- Gmina: Fredropol
- Population: 340

Młodowice [mwɔdɔˈvit͡sɛ] is a village in the administrative district of Gmina Fredropol, within Przemyśl County, Subcarpathian Voivodeship, in south-eastern Poland, close to the border with Ukraine.
