= Torki =

- Village
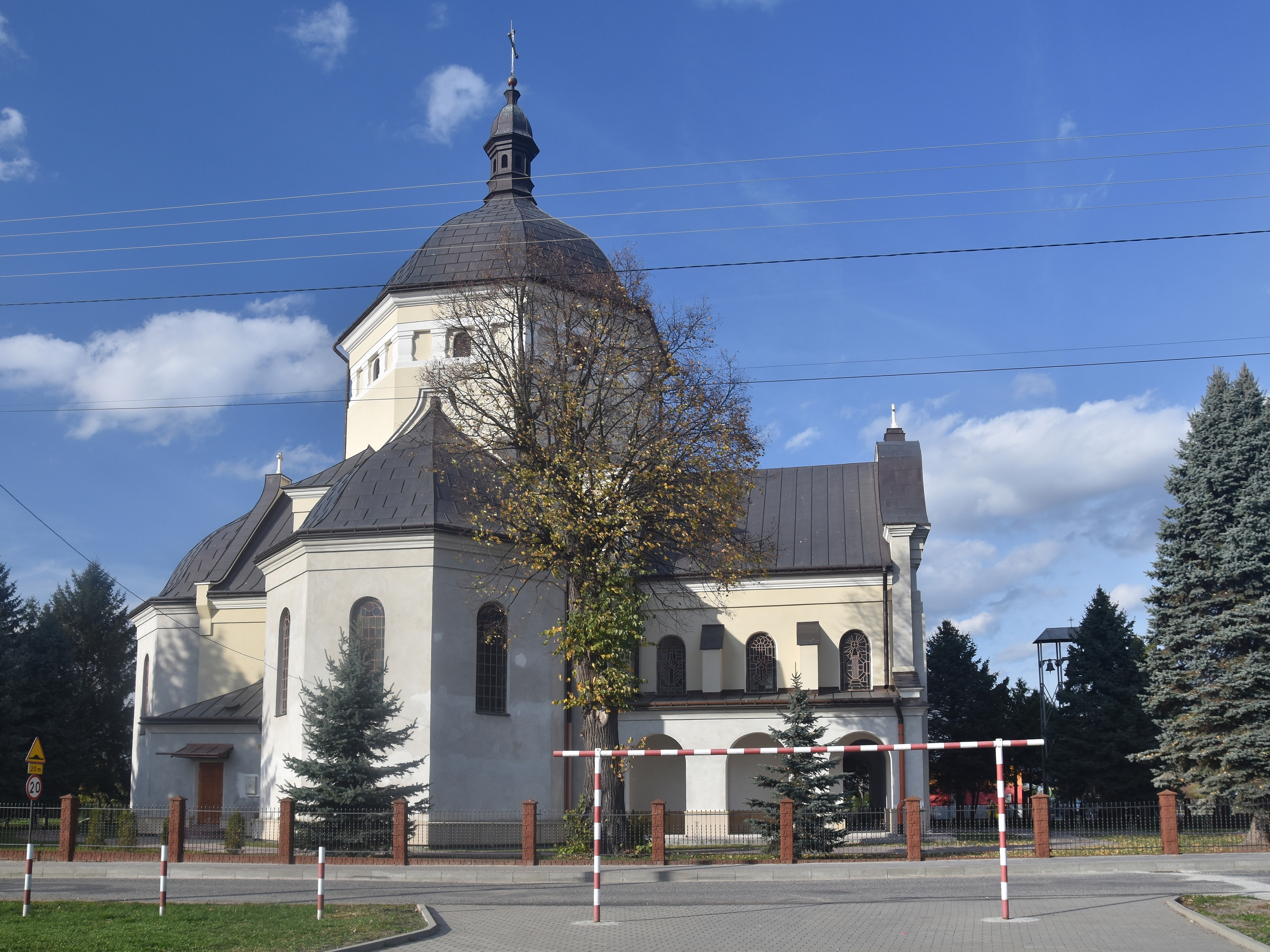
- Church of the Assumption of the Virgin Mary

- Location within Poland
- Coordinates: 49°50′N 22°56′E
- Country: Poland
- Voivodeship: Subcarpathian
- County: Przemyśl
- Gmina: Medyka

Population
  - Total: 851

Torki ([ˈtɔrki]; Ukrainian: Торки, romanized: Torky) is a village in the administrative district of Gmina Medyka, within Przemyśl County, Subcarpathian Voivodeship, in south-eastern Poland, close to the border with Ukraine.

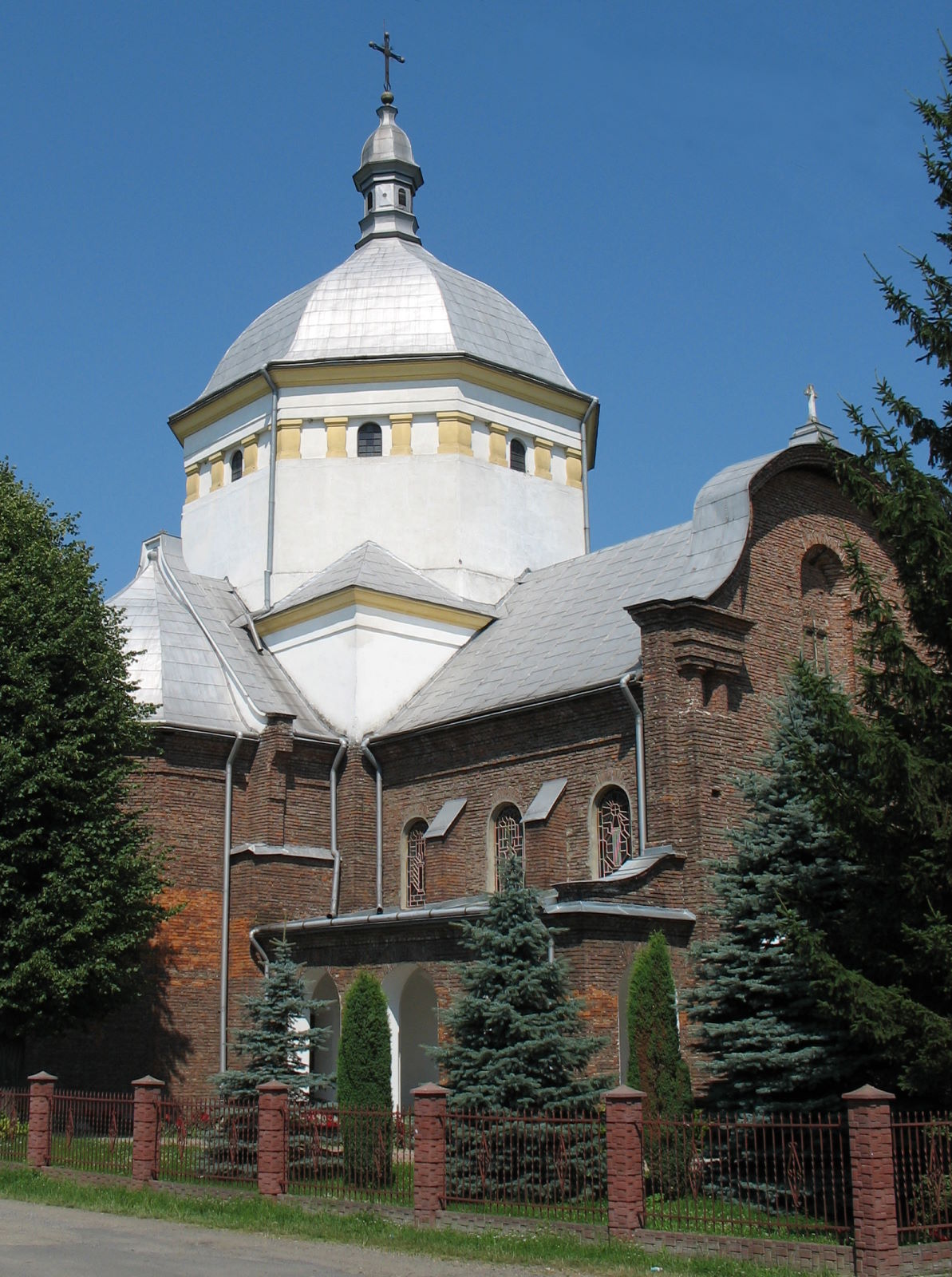
The Orthodox church before renovation

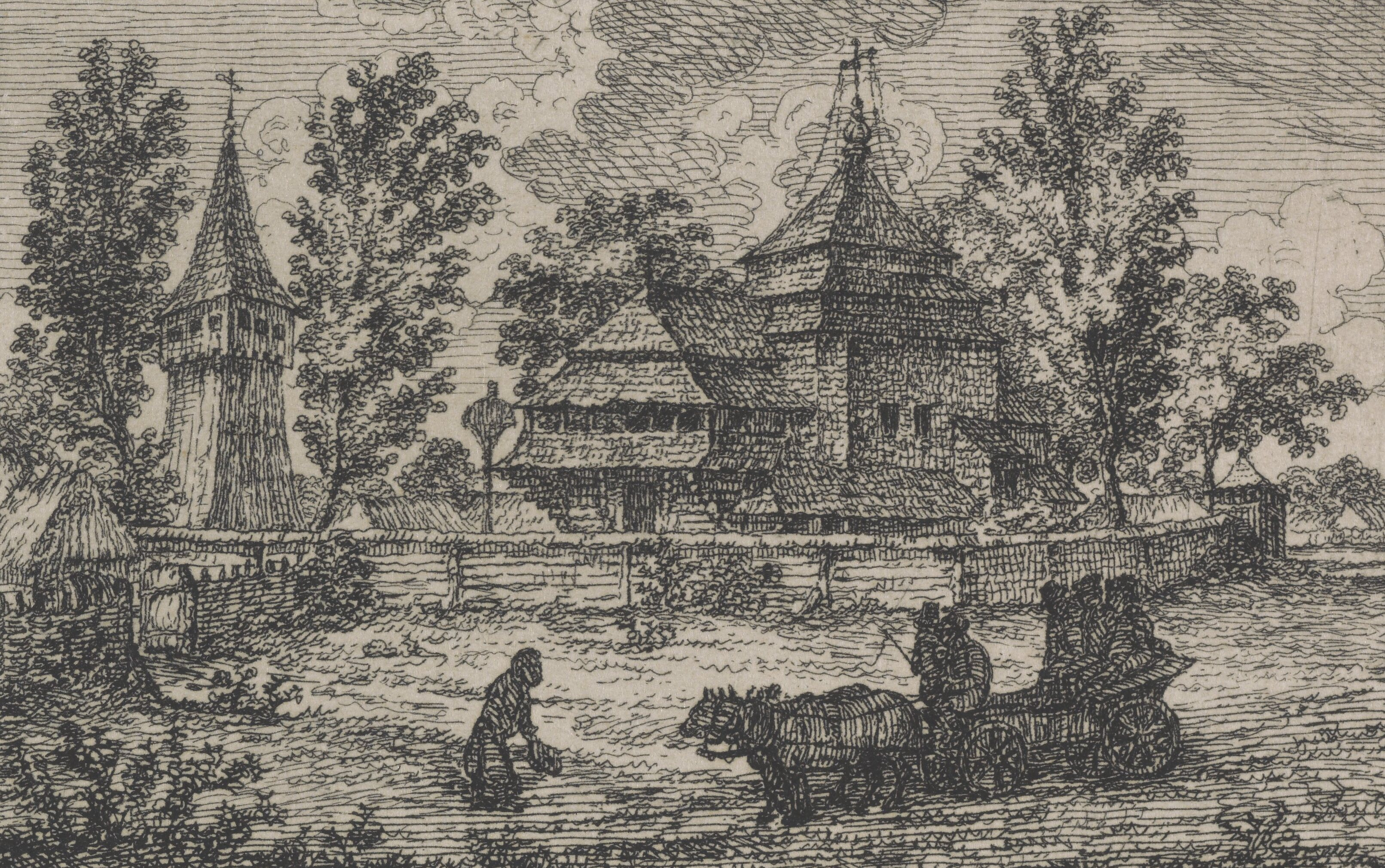
Old Orthodox church ca 1838
