= Nowosiółki Dydyńskie =

- Village
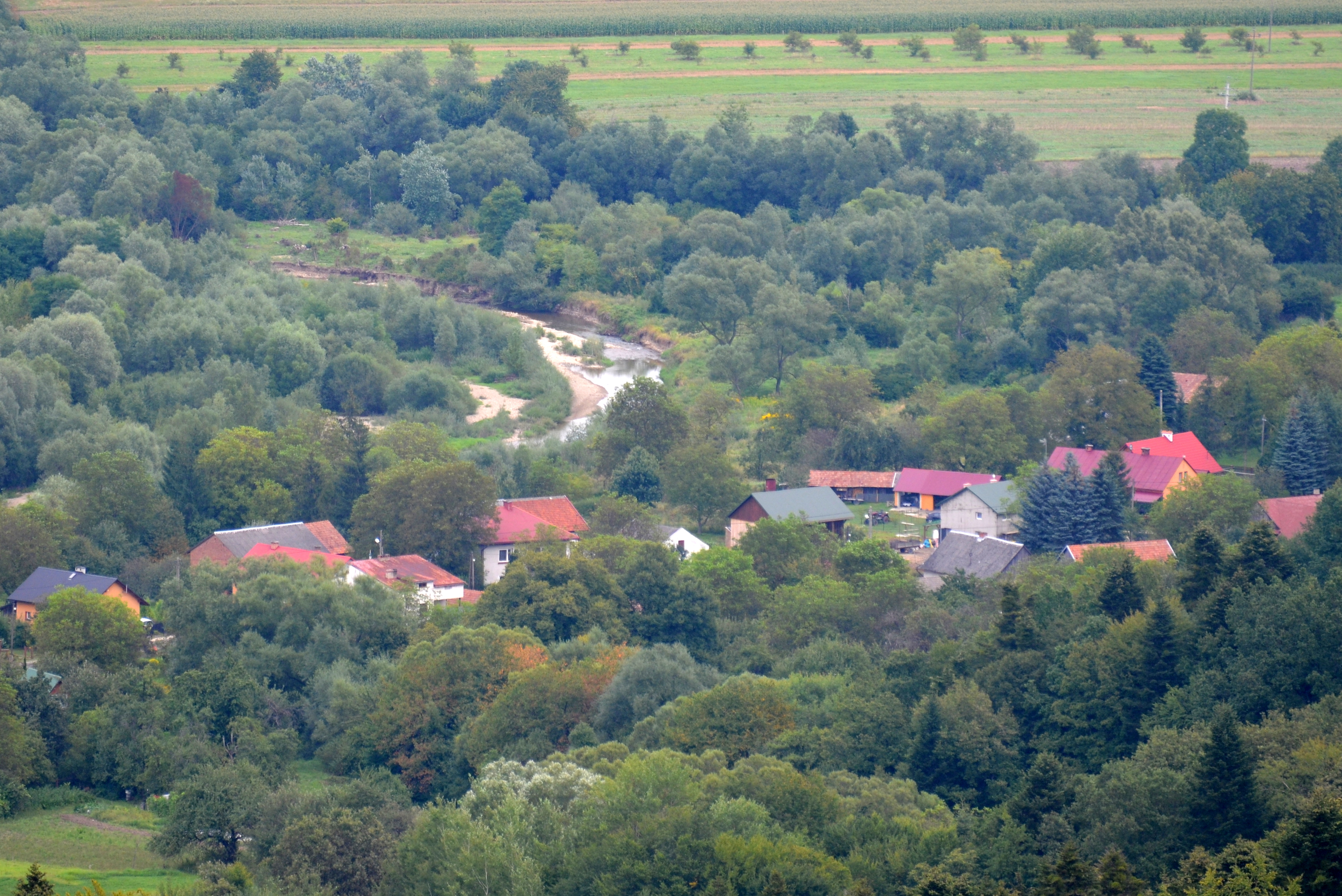
- Interactive map of Nowosiółki Dydyńskie
- Location within Poland
- Coordinates: 49°38′N 22°43′E
- Country: Poland
- Voivodeship: Subcarpathian
- County: Przemyśl
- Gmina: Fredropol
- Population (2020): 155
- Time zone: UTC+1 (CET)
  - Summer (DST): UTC+2 (CEST)
- Postal code: 37-743
- Area code: +48 16

Nowosiółki Dydyńskie [nɔvɔˈɕuu̯ki dɨˈdɨɲskʲɛ] is a village in the administrative district of Gmina Fredropol, within Przemyśl County, Subcarpathian Voivodeship, in south-eastern Poland, close to the border with Ukraine.
