= Koniuszki, Podkarpackie Voivodeship =

Koniuszki
- Village
- Location within Poland
- Coordinates: 49°43′N 22°49′E
- Country: Poland
- Voivodeship: Subcarpathian
- County: Przemyśl
- Gmina: Fredropol

Koniuszki [kɔˈɲuʂki] is a village in the administrative district of Gmina Fredropol, within Przemyśl County, Subcarpathian Voivodeship, in south-eastern Poland, close to the border with Ukraine.
