= Przemyśl Foothills Landscape Park =

Protected area in Poland

Coordinates: 49°43′N 22°29′E

- Park Krajobrazowy Pogórze Przemyskie
- IUCN category V (protected landscape/seascape)
- Interactive map of Przemyśl Foothills Landscape Park
- Location: Podkarpackie Voivodeship
- Area: 618.62 km^{2} (238.85 sq mi)
- Established: 1991

Przemyśl Foothills Landscape Park (Polish: Park Krajobrazowy Pogórza Przemyskiego) is a protected area (Landscape Park) in south-eastern Poland.

== Geography ==
The park protects an area of 618.62 square kilometres (238.85 sq mi). It was established in 1991, and is a Natura 2000 EU Special Protection Area.

The Park lies within Podkarpackie Voivodeship:

- within Przemyśl County in Gmina Bircza, Gmina Dubiecko, Gmina Fredropol, Gmina Krasiczyn, Gmina Krzywcza, Gmina Przemyśl
- within Rzeszów County in Gmina Dynów.

Within the Landscape Park are nine nature reserves.

== See also ==
- Landscape parks in Poland
- Special Protection Areas in Poland
- Natura 2000 in Poland
