= Ruszelczyce =

- Village
- Location within Poland
- Coordinates: 49°49′N 22°31′E
- Country: Poland
- Voivodeship: Subcarpathian
- County: Przemyśl
- Gmina: Krzywcza

Ruszelczyce [ruʂɛlˈt͡ʂɨt͡sɛ] is a village in the administrative district of Gmina Krzywcza, within Przemyśl County, Subcarpathian Voivodeship, in south-eastern Poland.
