= Skopów =

- Village

- Location within Poland
- Coordinates: 49°50′N 22°30′E
- Country: Poland
- Voivodeship: Subcarpathian
- County: Przemyśl
- Gmina: Krzywcza
- Time zone: UTC+1 (CET)
  - Summer (DST): UTC+2 (CEST)

Skopów [ˈskɔpuf] is a village in the administrative district of Gmina Krzywcza, within Przemyśl County, Subcarpathian Voivodeship, in south-eastern Poland.

Five Polish citizens were murdered by Nazi Germany in the village during World War II.
