= Jaksmanice =

- Village
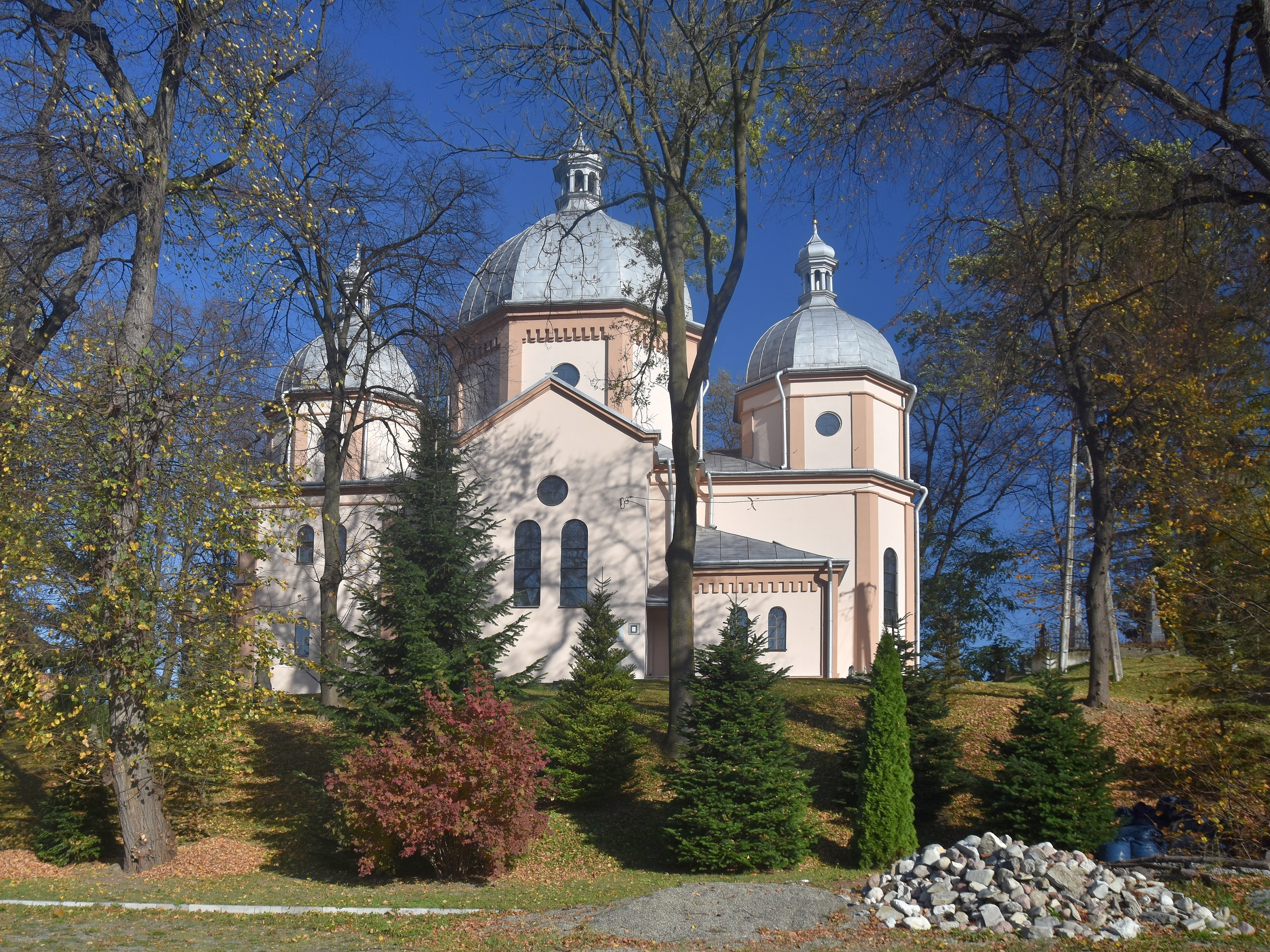
- Church of the Nativity of the Virgin Mary
- Interactive map of Jaksmanice
- Location within Poland
- Coordinates: 49°45′11″N 22°52′35″E
- Country: Poland
- Voivodeship: Subcarpathian
- County: Przemyśl
- Gmina: Medyka

Jaksmanice ([jaksmaˈnit͡sɛ]) is a village in the administrative district of Gmina Medyka, within Przemyśl County, Subcarpathian Voivodeship, in south-eastern Poland, close to the border with Ukraine.
