= Siedliska, Przemyśl County =

Siedliska
- Village
- Interactive map of Siedliska
- Location within Poland
- Coordinates: 49°45′N 22°53′E
- Country: Poland
- Voivodeship: Subcarpathian
- County: Przemyśl
- Gmina: Medyka
- Population: 640

Siedliska ([ɕɛdˈlʲiska]) is a village in the administrative district of Gmina Medyka, within Przemyśl County, Subcarpathian Voivodeship, in south-eastern Poland, close to the border with Ukraine.
