= Huwniki =

- Village
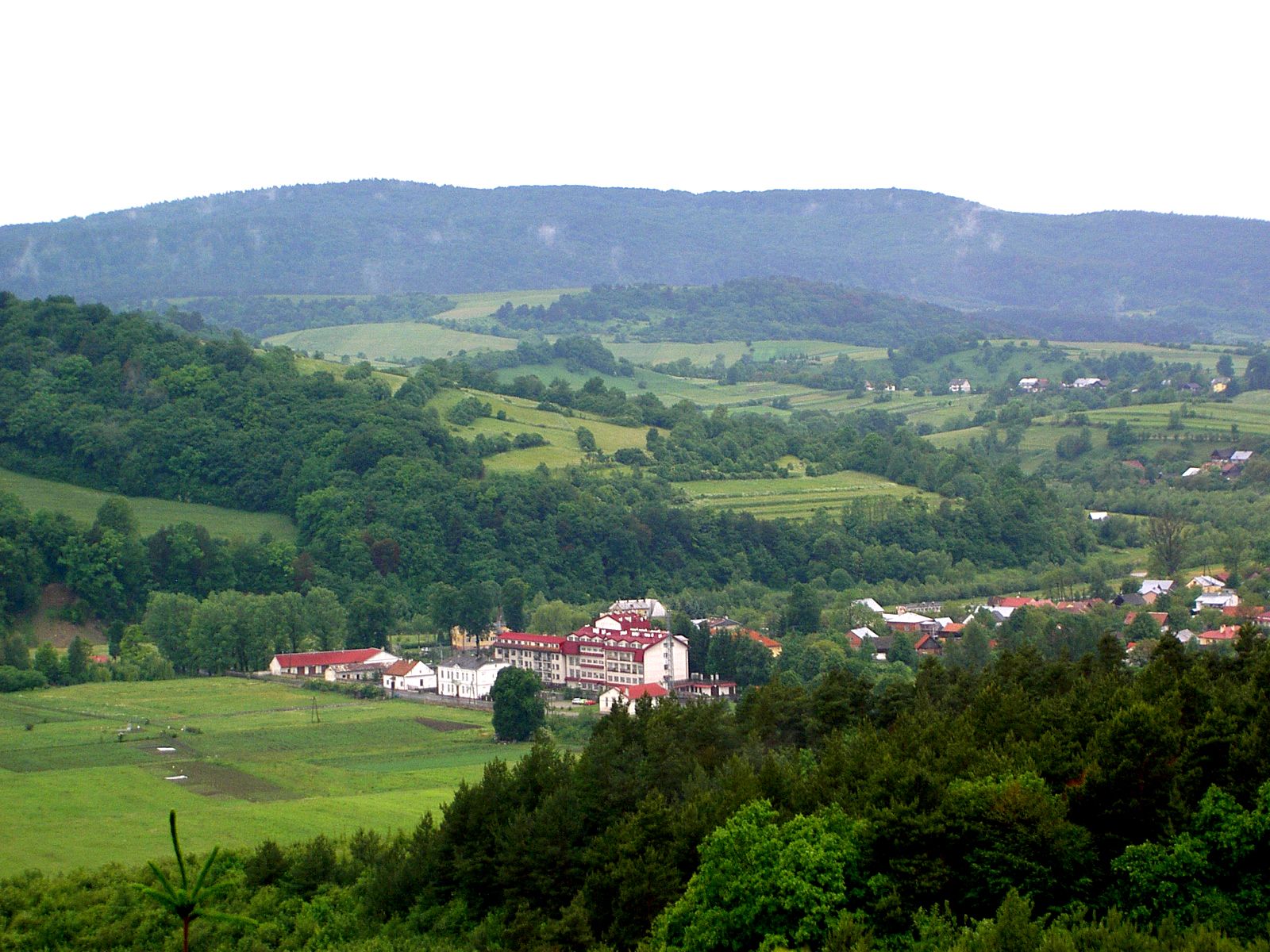

- Location within Poland
- Coordinates: 49°39′N 22°42′E
- Country: Poland
- Voivodeship: Subcarpathian
- County: Przemyśl
- Gmina: Fredropol
- Population: 677

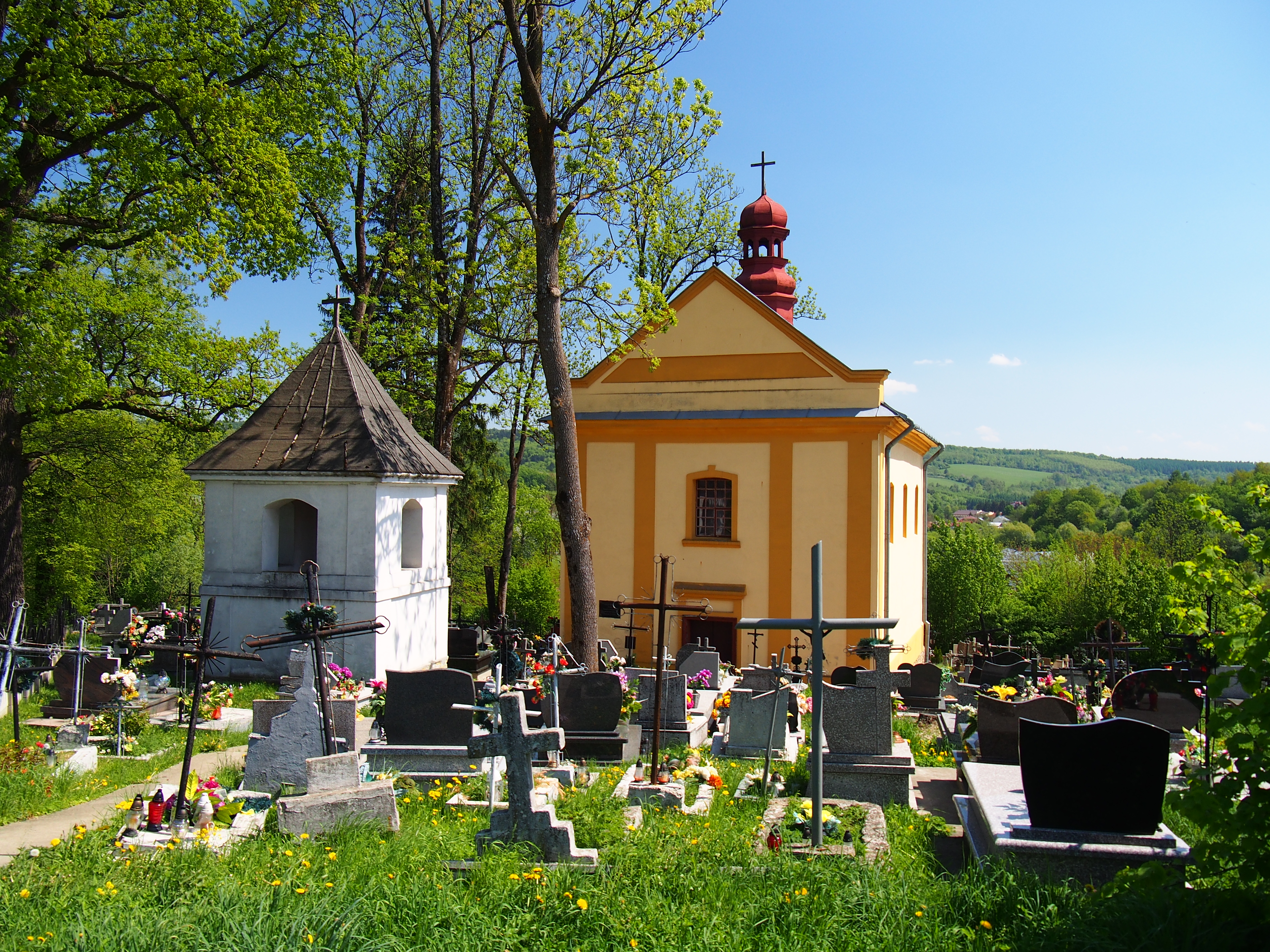
Orthodox Church of the Exaltation of the Holy Cross

Huwniki [xuvˈniki] is a village in the administrative district of Gmina Fredropol, within Przemyśl County, Subcarpathian Voivodeship (also known as Podkarpackie Voivodeship), in south-eastern Poland, close to the border with Ukraine. The name of the town in Ukrainian, Вугники, means charcoal.

Settlement in the village can be traced back to 1367 (when it was known as Uhelniki); royal records list King Casimir III the Great as entrusting the town to nobleman Stefan Wengzin. In 1507, tax records show there was already a Polish Orthodox Church parish there. During the 1800s until World War II, its population predominantly attended Eastern Catholic Churches.

During World War II in Poland, Huwniki was occupied by the Nazi army briefly in September 1939 before being voluntarily ceded to the Soviet army, then occupied by the Nazis again from June 1941 until July 1944, when the Soviets recaptured it. The town's population of 18 Jewish Poles was enslaved in the spring of 1942, and mass-murdered by Ukrainian police on 25 November 1942 at the Wiar creek near Przemyśl. After the war, as a border town with a large Orthodox population, the population was decimated by the involuntary population exchange between Poland and Soviet Ukraine.
