= Kopysno =

- Village
- Location within Poland
- Coordinates: 49°41′N 22°39′E
- Country: Poland
- Voivodeship: Subcarpathian
- County: Przemyśl
- Gmina: Fredropol
- Population: 6
- Website: http://kopysno.pl

Kopysno [kɔˈpɨsnɔ] is a village in the administrative district of Gmina Fredropol, within Przemyśl County, Subcarpathian Voivodeship, in south-eastern Poland, close to the border with Ukraine.
