= Krzywcza =

- Village
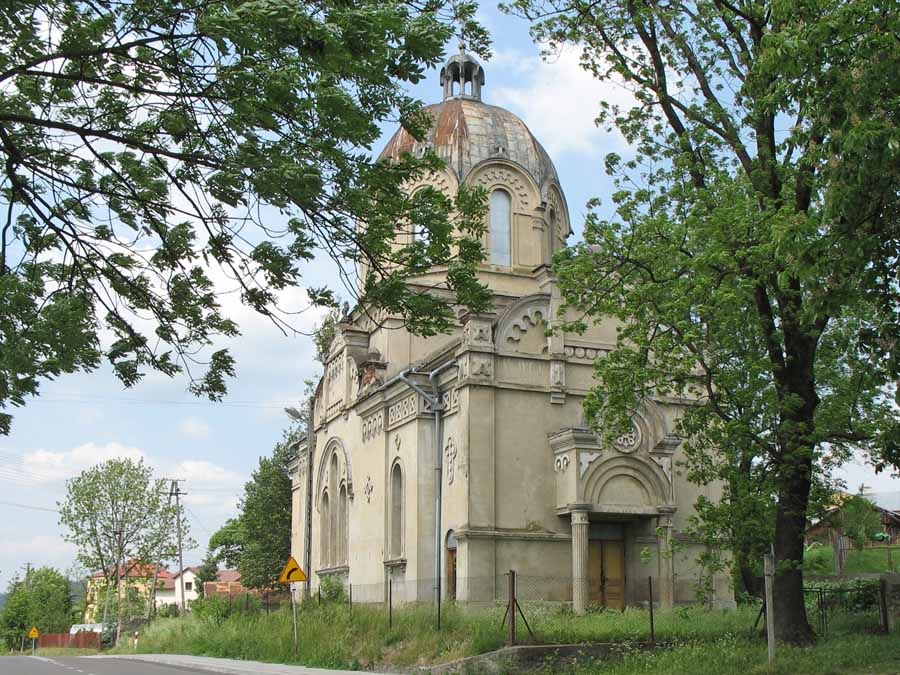
- Greek Catholic church

- Location within Poland
- Coordinates: 49°47′54″N 22°32′42″E
- Country: Poland
- Voivodeship: Subcarpathian
- County: Przemyśl
- Gmina: Krzywcza
- Population (approx.): 600

Krzywcza (Polish: [ˈkʂɨft͡ʂa]) is a village in Przemyśl County, Subcarpathian Voivodeship, in south-eastern Poland. It is the seat of the gmina (administrative district) called Gmina Krzywcza.
