= Gmina Krzywcza =

Gmina Krzywcza Krzywcza Commune
- Gmina
- Interactive map of Gmina Krzywcza
- Coordinates (Krzywcza): 49°47′54″N 22°32′42″E
- Country: Poland
- Voivodeship: Subcarpathian
- County: Przemyśl County
- Seat: Krzywcza

Area
  - Total: 94.47 km^{2} (36.48 sq mi)

Population (2013)
  - Total: 4,897
  - Density: 51.84/km^{2} (134.3/sq mi)
- Website: http://www.ugkrzywcza.pu.pl/

Gmina Krzywcza is a rural gmina (administrative district) in Przemyśl County, Subcarpathian Voivodeship, in south-eastern Poland. Its seat is the village of Krzywcza, which lies approximately 17 kilometres (11 mi) west of Przemyśl and 47 km (29 mi) south-east of the regional capital Rzeszów.

The gmina covers an area of 94.47 square kilometres (36.5 sq mi), and as of 2006 its total population is 5,048 (4,897 in 2013).

The gmina contains part of the protected area called Pogórze Przemyskie Landscape Park.

== Villages ==
Gmina Krzywcza contains the villages and settlements of Babice, Bachów, Chyrzyna, Krzywcza, Kupna, Reczpol, Ruszelczyce, Skopów, Średnia and Wola Krzywiecka.

== Neighbouring gminas ==
Gmina Krzywcza is bordered by the gminas of Bircza, Dubiecko, Krasiczyn, Pruchnik, Przemyśl, Rokietnica and Roźwienica.
