= Gmina Medyka =

Gmina Medyka Medyka Commune
- Gmina
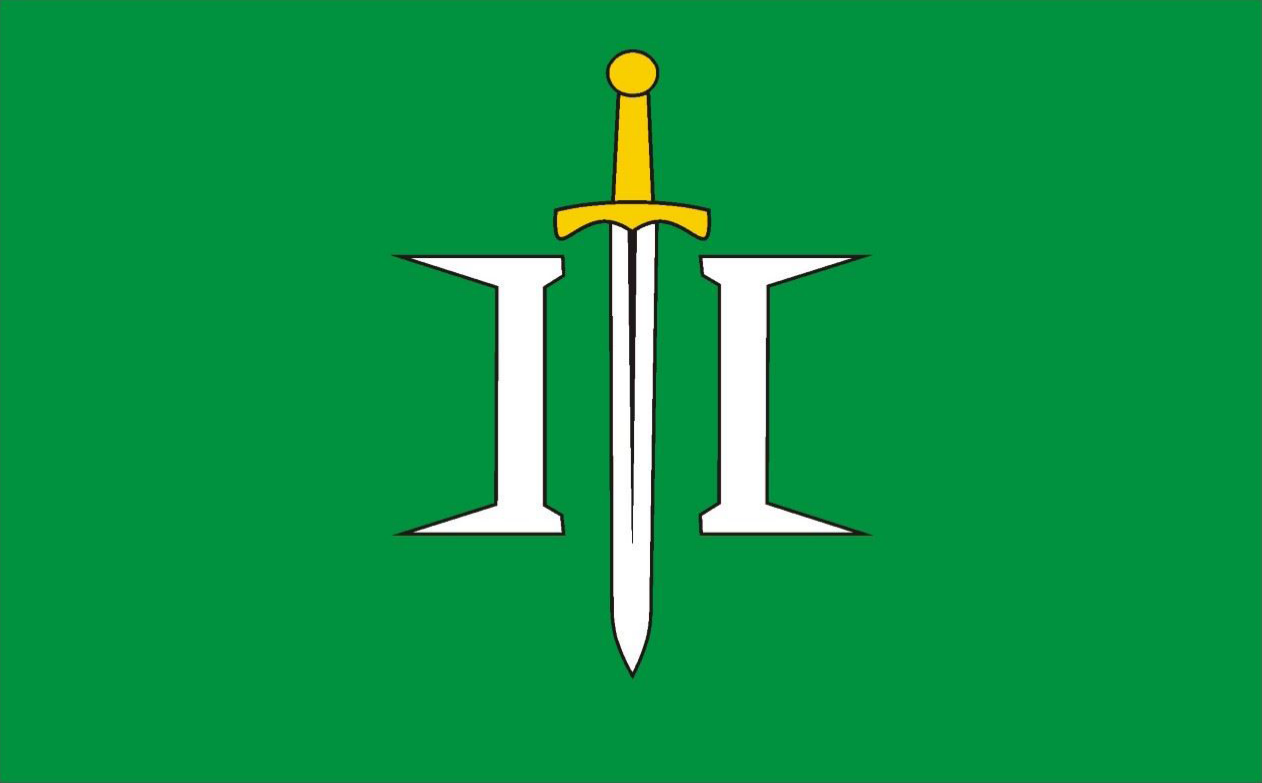
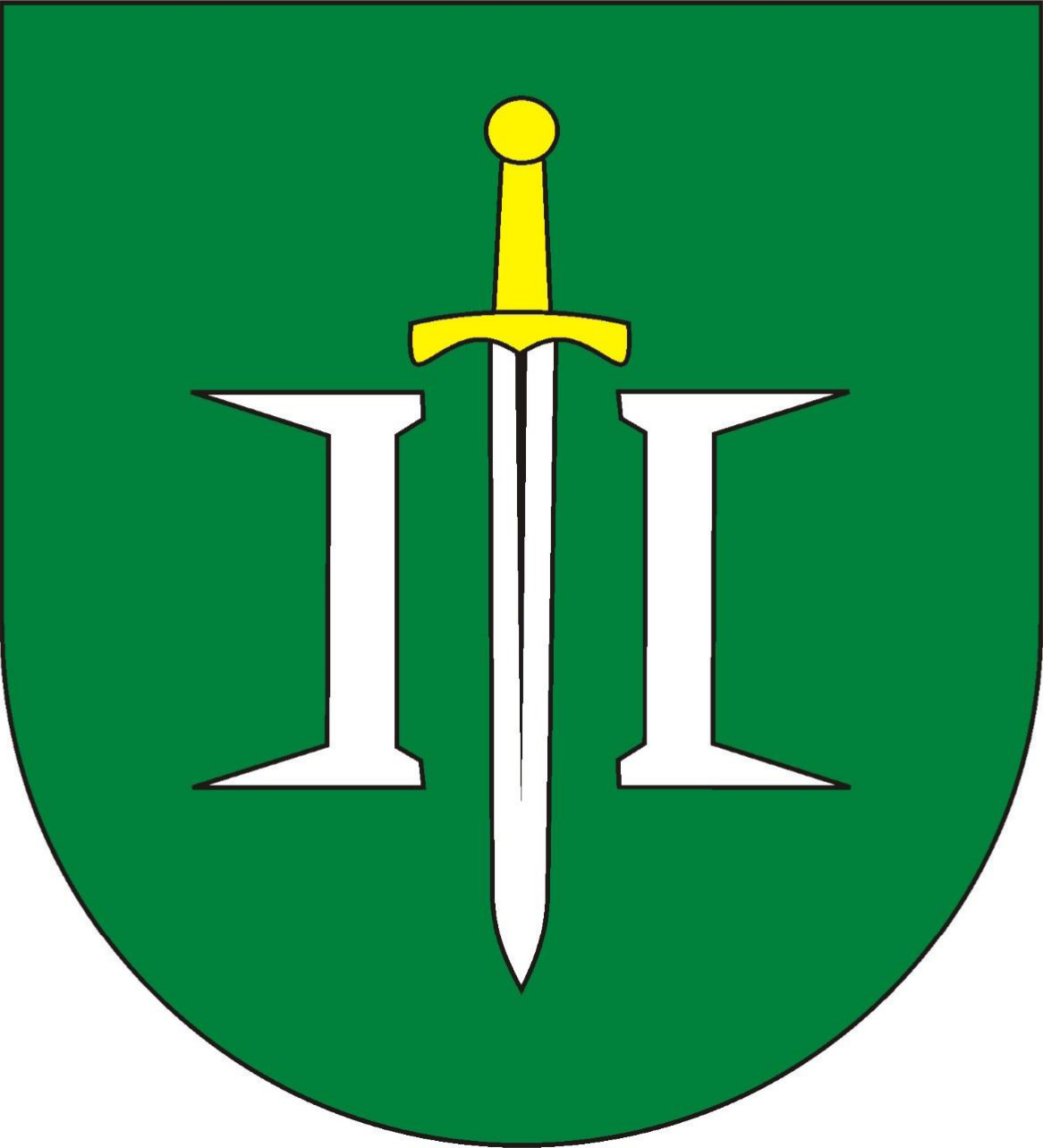
- Flag Coat of arms
- Interactive map of Gmina Medyka
- Coordinates (Medyka): 49°48′15″N 22°55′55″E
- Country: Poland
- Voivodeship: Subcarpathian
- County: Przemyśl County
- Seat: Medyka

Area
  - Total: 60.67 km^{2} (23.42 sq mi)

Population (2013)
  - Total: 6,459
  - Density: 106.5/km^{2} (275.7/sq mi)
- Website: http://www.medyka.itl.pl/

Gmina Medyka is a rural gmina (administrative district) in Przemyśl County, Subcarpathian Voivodeship, in south-eastern Poland, on the border with Ukraine. Its seat is the village of Medyka, which lies approximately 13 kilometres (8 mi) east of Przemyśl and 72 km (45 mi) east of the regional capital Rzeszów.

The gmina covers an area of 60.67 square kilometres (23.4 sq mi), and as of 2006 its total population is 5,906 (6,459 in 2013).

== Villages ==
Gmina Medyka contains the villages and settlements of Hureczko, Hurko, Jaksmanice, Leszno, Medyka, Siedliska and Torki.

== Neighbouring gminas ==
Gmina Medyka is bordered by the city of Przemyśl and by the gminas of Przemyśl, Stubno and Żurawica. It also borders Ukraine.
