= Capture of Kiev by the White Army =

Battle in 1919

- Part of the Russian Civil War, the Ukrainian War of Independence and the Ukrainian–Soviet War
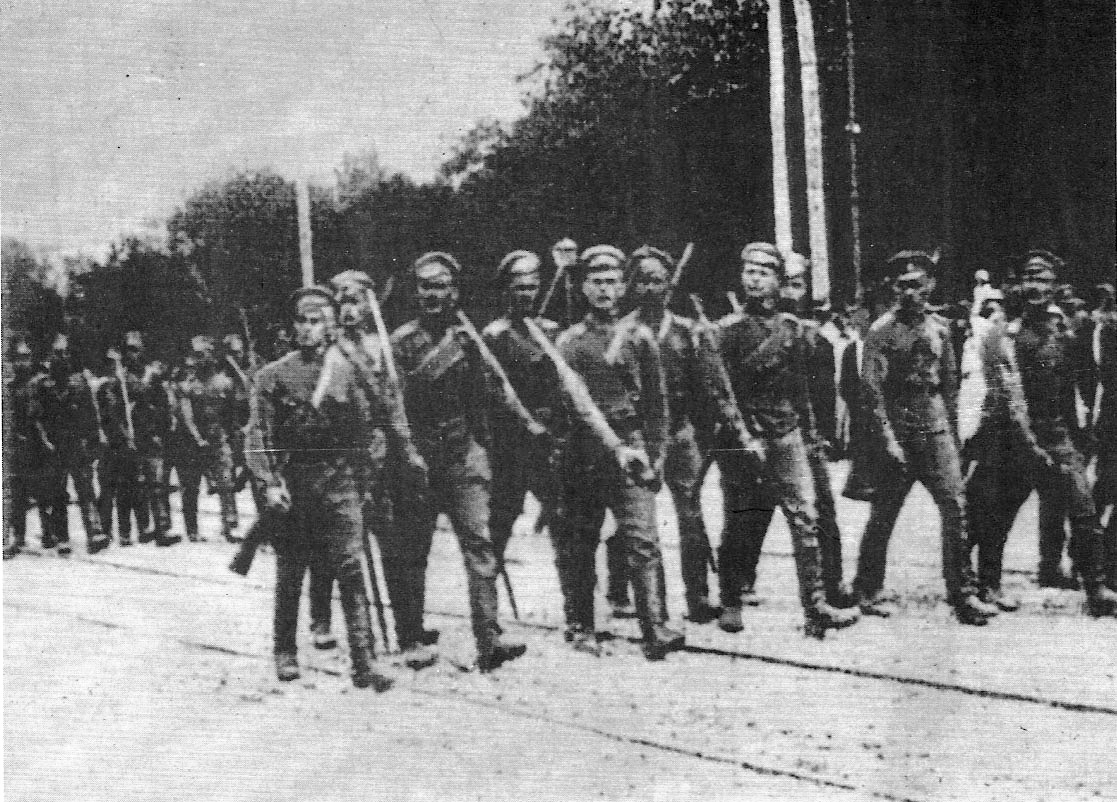
- The troops of General Bredov entering Kiev at Sophia Square, 31 August 1919
| Date | 30-31 August 1919 |
| Location | Kiev |
| Result | White Army victory |
| Territorial changes | Armed Forces of South Russia temporarily capture Kiev |

Belligerents
| Communists: Russian SFSR; Ukrainian SSR | Russian anticommunists: South Russia | Ukrainians: Ukrainian People's Republic |

Commanders and leaders
| Nikolai Semyonov; Gavril Kutyrev | Nikolai Bredov | Antin Kravs; Volodymyr Salsky |

Units involved
| Red Army: 12th Army | Armed Forces of South Russia: Kiev-Poltava Group | Ukrainian People's Army: Zaporizhian Corps; Ukrainian Galician Army: 1st Corps; 3rd Corps |

Strength
| Unknown | Up to 3,000 volunteers | Around 4,000 |

Casualties and losses
| Unknown | Unknown | 3,000 wounded or captured |

The Capture of Kiev by the White Army occurred on 30 August [O.S. 18 August] 1919 and was one of several battles fought in Kiev, the capital of Ukraine in 1919 during the Russian Civil War, in which the White Army captured the city from the Red Army without a fight.

In the course of the military operation, troops of the Ukrainian People's Army entered Kiev simultaneously with the units of the White Army, but were defeated. In Ukrainian historiography, the event has the name of the Kyiv catastrophe (Київська катастрофа).

== Prelude ==
The attack on Kiev was in support of General Vladimir May-Mayevsky's Advance on Moscow over Kursk, Orel and Tula. To secure the western flank, Nikolai Bredov was ordered to advance towards the Dnieper and Desna River and take Kiev and other Dnieper crossings in the Yekaterinoslav (Dnipro)-Bryansk sector. Anton Denikin also saw a possibility to make contact with Poland and Western Europe for support and supplies.

The White troops were under command of Lieutenant-General Nikolai Bredov and consisted of the 5th Cavalry Corps, the 7th Infantry Division and the Combined Guards Brigade with a total strength of approximately 6,000 men.

Kiev was under control of the Red Army since January 1919, but by the end of August, the state of the Red armies of the Southern Front was described as "serious". The morale of the Soviet troops was low after a series of defeats on the Southern Front.

Another player in the conflict was the pro-independence Ukrainian People's Republic of Symon Petliura with its headquarters in Vinnytsia. Despite the common Bolshevik enemy, the attitude of the Great-Russian White Army towards the Ukrainian People's Republic (Petliurists) was rather hostile. It was stated that :

the UPR can be either neutral, then they must immediately surrender their weapons and go home; or join us, recognizing our goals, one of which is a broad autonomy for the regions. If the Petliurists do not fulfill these conditions, then they must be considered as an enemy, as well as the Bolsheviks.

== The battle ==
=== Whites break the opposing Reds ===
In the first week of August 1919, the General Alexander Kutepov-led White 1st Army Corps struck at the junction of the 13th and 14th Soviet Armies. The Red Front was broken, and both armies were forced to retreat deep into Ukraine. The troops of the VSYUR wedged into the formed gap. The unified corps under the command of Bredov rushed towards Kiev, which housed the staff and logistics units of the 12th Army.

The Bolsheviks evacuated the city without a serious fight, after shooting hundreds of residents detained by the Cheka in the last days of Bolshevik power in the city.

=== Ukrainian offensive ===
Offensive of Ukrainian troops (blue) on Kyiv in August 1919; simultaneous advance of White forces is shown in green

From the west, simultaneously with the beginning of the White offensive, Ukrainian troops began their offensive.

The Ukrainian army, under the command of General Antin Kravs, consisted of the Galician Army's I and III Corps and the UPR Army's Zaporizhzhia Corps (without the 2nd Brigade), totalling up to 18,000 bayonets and sabers. Anticipating the inevitability of meeting White Army troops, Ukrainian Army commander Mykola Yunakiv ordered his forces to avoid entering into armed conflict with them. The Ukrainian Army arrived first and occupied the city by the end of 30 August, after some skirmishes with rearguard Red Army troops. On 31 August, a victory parade was planned at 16:00 on the Duma Square in the presence of Petlyura.

Due to carelessness and because intelligence reported that the White Army would not be able to be in Kiev before 3 September, not all bridges over the Dnieper had been secured. However, the White Army's vanguard had already reached the Kiev suburbs by the evening of 30 August.

=== White and Ukrainian confrontation ===
The next day, up to 3,000 volunteers began to advance towards the city center, disarming all the Ukrainian detachments they met on the way. When the Ukrainian troops marched solemnly in column to the Duma Square, the advanced sections of the volunteers, under the command of N. I. Stakelberg, entered the city over the Chain Bridge. Around noon, the Ukrainian units were in the Duma Square near the Kiev City Council, on the balcony of which the Ukrainian flag was hoisted. Having found out that White volunteers were already in Kiev, Petliura canceled his arrival in the city and gave the order to cancel the planned parade. The commander of the Galician Army, Myron Tarnavsky, also left the city. Around two o'clock in the afternoon, the volunteers arrived at Duma Square. The commander of the squadron of volunteers, introducing himself to the general, asked permission for his unit to take part in the parade and install a Russian tricolor next to the Ukrainian flag already posted on the Duma. General Anton Kravs agreed to both requests.

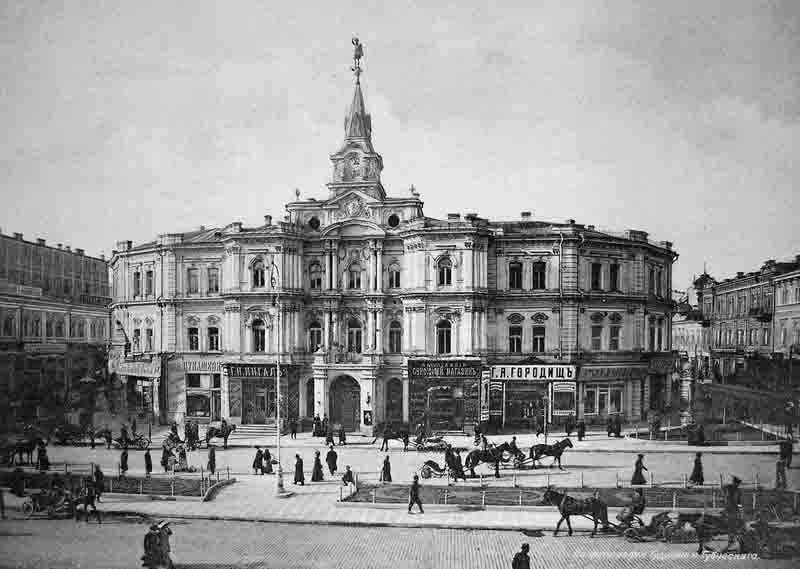
Building of the City Duma where the confrontation between the Ukrainian forces and units of the White Army started

But when Colonel Volodymyr Salsky of the Zaporizhzhia Corps arrived and saw the Russian tricolor on the Duma, he gave the order to bring that flag down. One of his soldiers climbed the balcony, tore off the Russian flag and threw it to the ground in the dust under the hooves of the horses. An enraged volunteer cavalryman tried to cut down Colonel Salsky, but was himself killed. This led to an exchange of fire between the White volunteers and the Ukrainians. Several soldiers were killed or wounded, and the Ukrainians hastily fled from Duma Square. The news of the clash spread quickly, and throughout Kiev volunteers began to disarm and take prisoner Ukrainian units. In total, up to 3,000 fighters of the Ukrainian army were disarmed or captured, including the headquarters of the III Corps. Some 4,000 Ukrainian soldiers under the command of Colonel Mikitka concentrated around the railway station, waiting for orders from their command, but none were received.

=== Negotiations and agreement ===
Territories controlled by the Ukrainian armies following their retreat from Kyiv (yellow)

Ukrainian General Kravs tried to negotiate with the White General Bredov, but Bredov stated that "Kiev, the Mother of Russian cities, was never Ukrainian and will never be, and that there can not be any negotiations with the delegation of the UPR army." Bredov demanded that Kravs immediately pull out all his Ukrainian troops from Kiev.

Ukrainian General Kravs then agreed to withdraw the Ukrainian troops from Kiev for a day's march (about 25 kilometers) to the West. The Ukrainian troops were not to undertake any hostile actions against the volunteers, and could not take more from Kiev than they brought with them. The parties mutually exchanged prisoners and returned the weapons of the disarmed detachments.

== Aftermath ==
On 4 September [O.S. 22 August] 1919, Petliura gave an order to withdraw the Ukrainian troops even further West, to the Kazatin - Zhitomir line. The wider Kiev region was occupied by the group of General Bredov, composed of the 15th and 7th divisions (up to 8,000 soldiers).

Galician Army general Myron Tarnavsky considered the Ukrainian retreat from Kyiv to be a consequence of the White Army's superior strength and the fact, that it had stronger support among the local population.

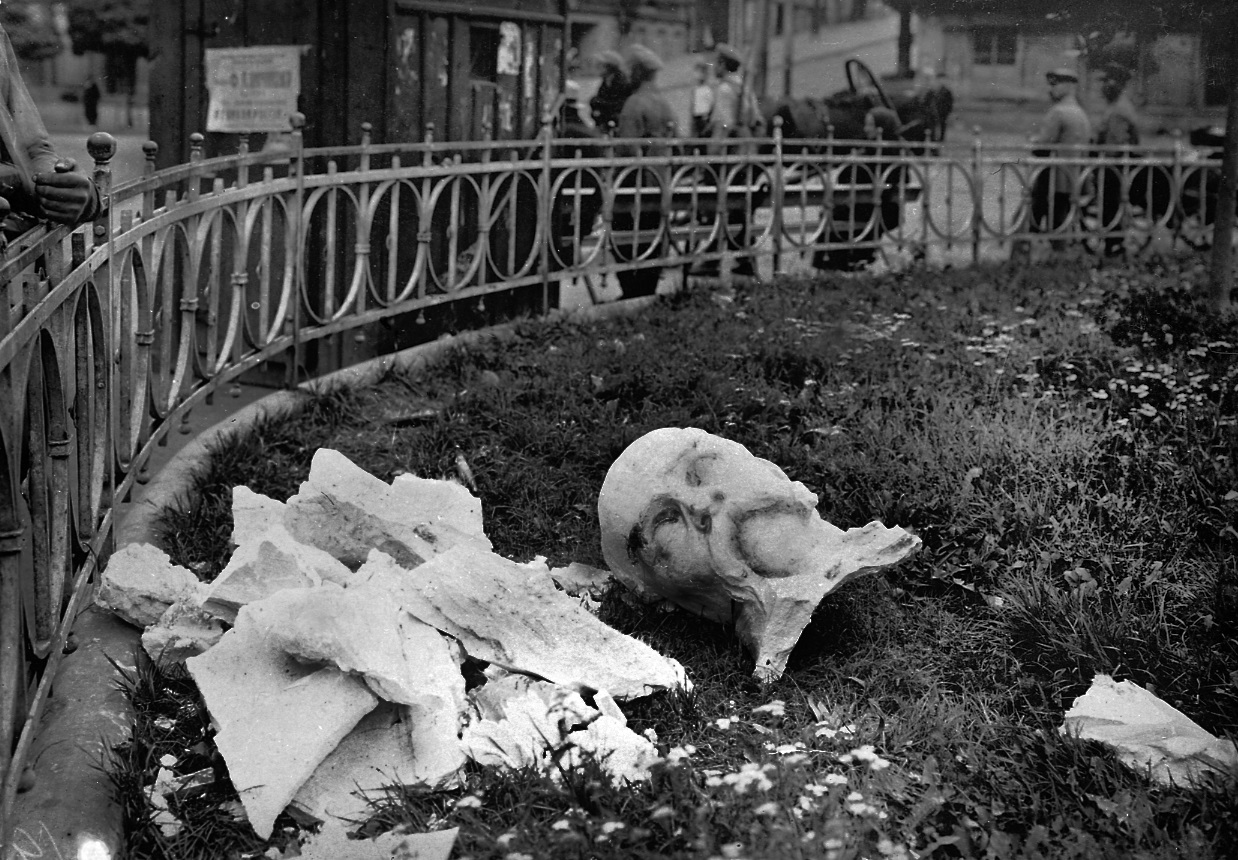
The toppled monument to Shevchenko in Kyiv, September 1919

Further negotiations were foiled, because of the Whites' inflexible goal of restoring a unified, indivisible Russia within the pre-war borders. Such conditions were absolutely unacceptable for the Ukrainian side and it was not possible to create a single anti-Bolshevik front in the southwest of Russia.

The capture of Kyiv by the Whites was followed by severe repressions against the city's Jewish and Ukrainian communities. Actively supported by the Kievlyanin newspaper, the campaign was led by members of Russian nationalist circles such as Anatoly Savenko and Vasily Shulgin. All Ukrainian language signs were removed from the streets, and a Ukrainian book shop was forced to close down. The monument to Ukrainian poet Taras Shevchenko was destroyed, although the White leadership swiftly condemned that action. On 11 September the Ukrainian Rada newspaper was closed down. Teaching in Ukrainian language was forbidden, except from private schools, which led to protests among teachers.

Kiev was retaken by the Bolsheviks in December 1919.

== See also ==
- Bibliography of the Russian Revolution and Civil War
- Outline of the Russian Revolution and Civil War
- Index of articles related to the Russian Revolution and Civil War
- The "Russian" Civil Wars, 1916–1926: Ten Years That Shook the World
- Russia in Flames: War, Revolution, Civil War, 1914–1921
- Russia in Revolution: An Empire in Crisis, 1890 to 1928
- Russia: Revolution and Civil War, 1917—1921
- The Russian Revolution: A New History
