= Antin Kravs =

Ukrainian general

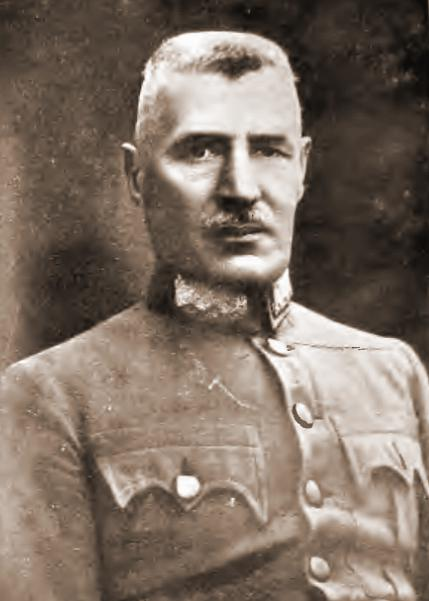
- Native name: Антін Кравс
- Born: 23 November 1871; Berehomet, Duchy of Bukovina, Austria-Hungary
- Died: 13 November 1945 (aged 73) Vienna, Austria
- Buried: Kalksburg Cemetery, Vienna, Austria
- Allegiance: Austria-Hungary; West Ukrainian People's Republic
- Branch: Austro-Hungarian Army; Ukrainian Galician Army
- Service years: General Chotar
- Conflicts: World War I Polish–Ukrainian War: Battle of Khyriv; Polish–Soviet War

Antin Kravs (Note: Ukrainian: Антін Кравс; Polish: Antin Kraws; German: Anton Kraus) (23 November 1871 – 13 November 1945) was a Ukrainian general who was most notable for commanding the 3rd Corps in the Polish-Ukrainian War.

== Biography ==
He was born on 23 November 1871, in the village of Berehomet in the family of German origin. His mother is Ukrainian.

On 1 September 1891, after graduating from the Infantry Cadet School in Vienna, he was appointed a cadet-deputy officer and incorporated into the Hungarian Infantry Regiment No. 67 in Prešov. It was only after five years (1 November 1895) that he was promoted to second lieutenant, and after another four years to lieutenant on 1 November 1899. While still serving in the Hungarian Infantry Regiment No. 67, on 1 November 1909, he was promoted to captain. In 1911 he was transferred to the Galician Infantry Regiment No. 58 in Stanisławów. In the years 1912–1913, he took part in the mobilization of the armed forces of the Austro-Hungarian Monarchy, introduced in connection with the Balkan Wars.

During the First World War, he was the commander of the 58th Stanislavivsky Regiment and the 55th Brzezany Regiment on the Russian and Italian fronts. Kravs was promoted to Major and later on, Lieutenant Colonel within the Austro-Hungarian Army.

From December 1918, he would serve in the Ukrainian Galician Army and was the active commander of the battle group "Khirov" of the 8th Sambir Brigade of the 3rd Corps of the UGA in the Polish-Ukrainian War. In the spring of 1919, just before the introduction of the Dictatorship of the Western Ukrainian People's Republic, the military circles of the Galician Army proposed appointing Kravs as Dictator since he was an experienced general and Yevhen Petrushevych had no military knowledge. In August 1919 he was commander of the III army group in the Kiev offensive operation of both GA and the Active Armies, with which he occupied Kyiv on August 30 and held it until August 31, 1919 (he was forced to leave the capital due to misunderstandings in orders with the Chief Ataman of the UPR Petliura).

In the autumn of 1919 he was commander of the 3rd Corps on the Bolshevik and Denikin fronts. In 1920, he was commander of the Chuga Brigade, joined the Army of the Ukrainian People's Republic, commander of the group that in August 1920 broke through (through Pokuttya and the Carpathians) to Czechoslovakia, was in the camps of interned UGA units in Liberec. From 1924 in Vienna, Kravs was an activist of UGA veterans' societies, author of memoirs "For the Ukrainian cause." In 1941 he became a member of the Ukrainian General Council of Combatants.

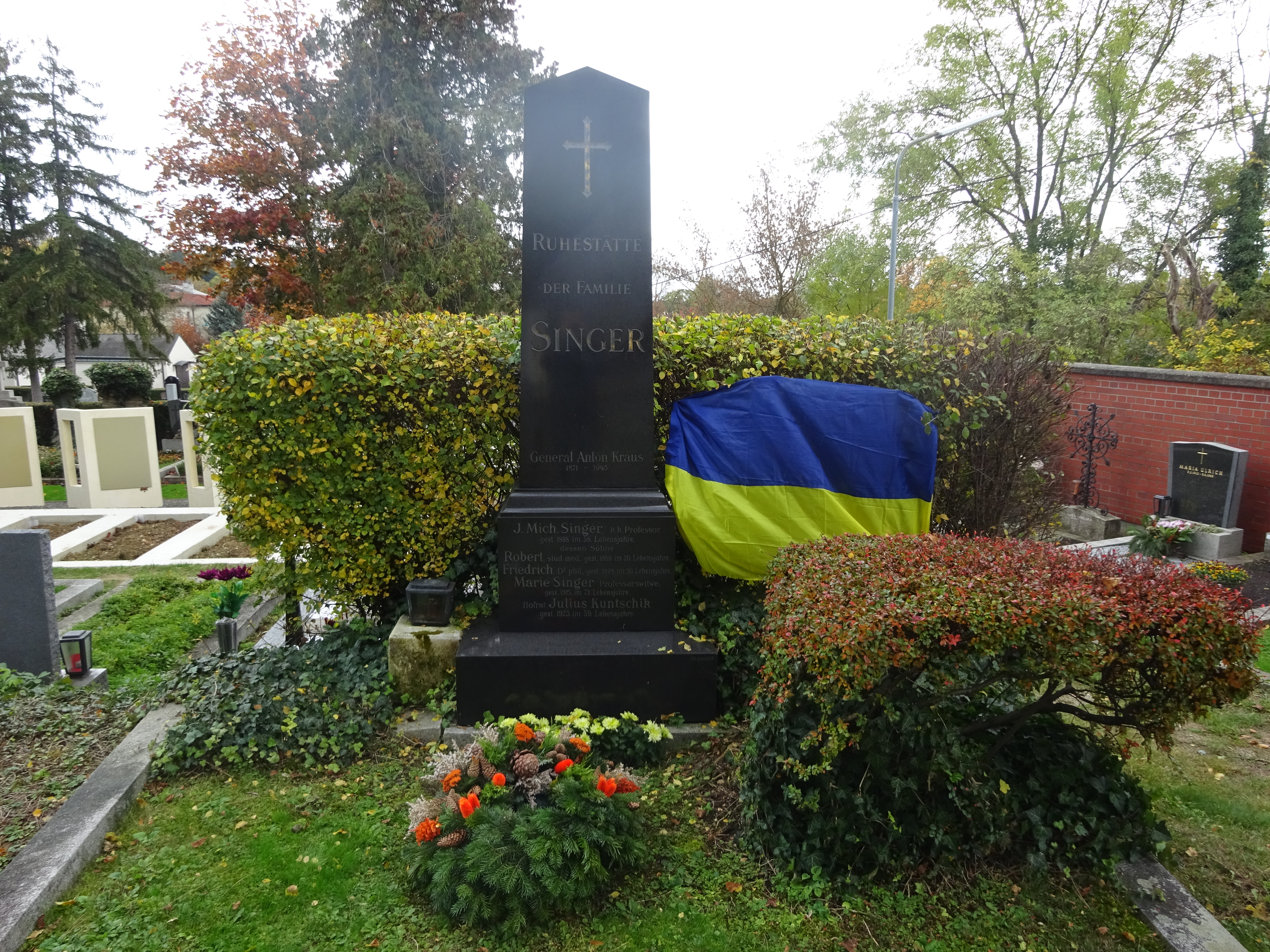
Tomb of Antin Kravs in Kalksburg Cemetery

He died on 13 November 1945, in Vienna and buried in Vienna at the Kalksburg Cemetery (grave location: Gruppe 9 Nummer 19).

== Legacy ==
General Kravs is depicted in the film The Secret Diary of Symon Petliura. However, according to Kyiv historian Andriy Rukkas, his figure is depicted incorrectly as his surname is distorted to Krevs. The film also presents both false information about the military unit with which Kravs allegedly dealt in the Carpathians, and the absurdity about the incomprehensible solitary travels and meetings with Petliura.

== Works ==
- A. Kravs For the Ukrainian cause. Memories of III. U.G.A. after crossing Zbruch. – Lviv: Publishing Cooperative "Red Viburnum", 1937. – 100 p.

== Bibliography ==
- Schematismus für das k.u.k. Heer und für die k.u.k. Kriegsmarine für 1892 (in German). Vienna: Nadworna i Państwowa Drukarnia. January 1892.
- Schematismus für das k.u.k. Heer und für die k.u.k. Kriegsmarine für 1896 (in German). Vienna: Nadworna i Państwowa Drukarnia. December 1895.
- Schematismus für das k.u.k. Heer und für die k.u.k. Kriegsmarine für 1900 (in German). Vienna: Nadworna i Państwowa Drukarnia. December 1899.
- Schematismus für das k.u.k. Heer und für die k.u.k. Kriegsmarine für 1910 (in German). Vienna: Nadworna i Państwowa Drukarnia. December 1909.
- Schematismus für das k.u.k. Heer und für die k.u.k. Kriegsmarine für 1912 (in German). Vienna: Nadworna i Państwowa Drukarnia. December 1911.
- Schematismus für das k.u.k. Heer und für die k.u.k. Kriegsmarine für 1914 (in German). Vienna: Nadworna i Państwowa Drukarnia. February 1914.
- Ranglisten des kaiserlichen und königlichen Heeres 1916 (in German). Vienna: Nadworna i Państwowa Drukarnia. 1916.
- Ranglisten des kaiserlichen und königlichen Heeres 1917 (in German). Vienna: Nadworna i Państwowa Drukarnia. 1917.
- Ranglisten des kaiserlichen und königlichen Heeres 1918 (in German). Vienna: Nadworna i Państwowa Drukarnia. 1918.
- Kravs Antin in: Encyclopedia of the History of Ukraine: Vol. 5. Editor: VA Smoliy (chairman) and others. NAS of Ukraine. Institute of History of Ukraine. – Kyiv 2008, Ed. "Scientific thought". ISBN 966-00-0632-2.
- Encyclopedia of Ukraine
- Kravs Antin // Довідник з історії України — 2-ге вид. — К., 2001. — pp. 362–363.
- Kovalenko Sergey. Kravs Antin / Black Cossacks: the history of the regiment. 2nd edition. – Kyiv: Stix Publishing House, 2015. – 368 p.
- Naumenko K. Ye . Kravs Antin
- Hussar. Yu. General-Chetar from Beregomet / Yuhym Gsar // Nimchych, 2016. – P.105.
