= Sierakośce =

- Village
- Interactive map of Sierakośce
- Location within Poland
- Coordinates: 49°40′N 22°46′E
- Country: Poland
- Voivodeship: Subcarpathian
- County: Przemyśl
- Gmina: Fredropol
- Website: http://www.sierakosce.republika.pl/

Sierakośce [ɕɛraˈkɔɕt͡sɛ] is a village in the administrative district of Gmina Fredropol, within Przemyśl County, Subcarpathian Voivodeship, in south-eastern Poland, close to the border with Ukraine.
