= Gmina Fredropol =

Gmina Fredropol Fredropol Commune
- Gmina
- Coat of arms
- Interactive map of Gmina Fredropol
- Coordinates (Fredropol): 49°42′N 22°45′E
- Country: Poland
- Voivodeship: Subcarpathian
- County: Przemyśl County
- Seat: Fredropol

Area
  - Total: 159.68 km^{2} (61.65 sq mi)

Population (2013)
  - Total: 5,554
  - Density: 34.78/km^{2} (90.09/sq mi)
- Website: http://www.gminafredropol.home.pl/

Gmina Fredropol is a rural gmina (administrative district) in Przemyśl County, Subcarpathian Voivodeship, in south-eastern Poland, on the border with Ukraine. Its seat is the village of Fredropol, which lies approximately 10 kilometres (6 mi) south of Przemyśl and 66 km (41 mi) south-east of the regional capital Rzeszów.

The gmina covers an area of 159.68 square kilometres (61.7 sq mi), and as of 2006 its total population is 5,400 (5,554 in 2013).

The gmina contains part of the protected area called Pogórze Przemyskie Landscape Park.

== Villages ==
Gmina Fredropol contains the villages and settlements of Aksmanice, Borysławka, Darowice, Fredropol, Gruszowa, Huwniki, Kalwaria Pacławska, Kłokowice, Kniażyce, Koniusza, Koniuszki, Kopysno, Kormanice, Kupiatycze, Leszczyny, Makowa, Młodowice, Nowe Sady, Nowosiółki Dydyńskie, Pacław, Paportno, Posada Rybotycka, Rybotycze, Sierakośce, Sólca and Sopotnik.

== Neighbouring gminas ==
Gmina Fredropol is bordered by the gminas of Bircza, Krasiczyn, Przemyśl and Ustrzyki Dolne. It also borders Ukraine.
