= Fredropol =

- Village
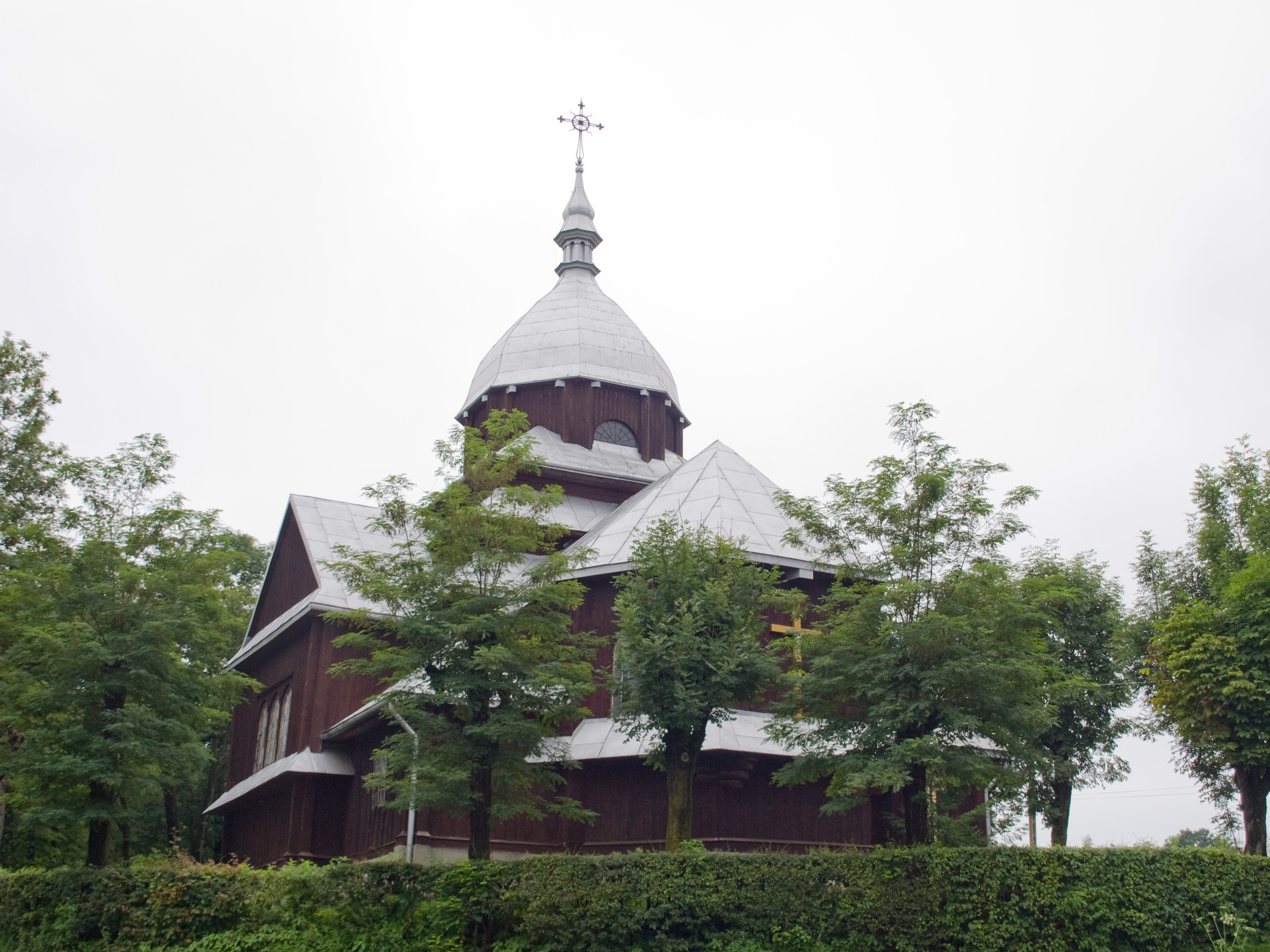
- Former Greek Catholic, currently Roman Catholic church
- Interactive map of Fredropol
- Location within Poland
- Coordinates: 49°42′N 22°45′E
- Country: Poland
- Voivodeship: Subcarpathian
- County: Przemyśl
- Gmina: Fredropol

Population
  - Total: 600

Fredropol [frɛˈdrɔpɔl] is a village in Przemyśl County, Subcarpathian Voivodeship, in south-eastern Poland, close to the border with Ukraine. It is the seat of the gmina (administrative district) called Gmina Fredropol.
