= Posada Khyrivska =

Posada Khyrivska Посада Хирівська
- neighborhood
- Interactive map of Posada Khyrivska
- Country: Ukraine
- Oblast: Lviv oblast
- City: Khyriv

Posada Khyrivska, (Ukrainian: Посада Хирівська), a neighborhood in Khyriv. Former village incorporoated into the city of Khyriv in 1931, the development of this area is mostly low-rise.

== History ==
the village Posada Khyrivska became a part of Khyriv on March 30, 1931. Before that it was considered a suburban area of the city despite having been officially included only in 1931.

== Etymology ==
while the true origins of the name are not known or lost, it can be assumed that the name derives from the ukrainian word ( Посад ), which means a settlement of craftsmen.
