= Przemyśl County =

Przemyśl County Powiat przemyski
- County
- Flag Coat of arms

- Location within the voivodeship
- Coordinates (Przemyśl): 49°47′N 22°46′E
- Country: Poland
- Voivodeship: Subcarpathian
- Seat: Przemyśl
- Gminas: Total 10: Gmina Bircza; Gmina Dubiecko; Gmina Fredropol; Gmina Krasiczyn; Gmina Krzywcza; Gmina Medyka; Gmina Orły; Gmina Przemyśl; Gmina Stubno; Gmina Żurawica

Area
  - Total: 1,213.73 km^{2} (468.62 sq mi)

Population (2019)
  - Total: 74,234
  - Density: 61.162/km^{2} (158.41/sq mi)
- Car plates: RPR
- Website: www.powiat.przemysl.pl

Przemyśl County (Polish: powiat przemyski) is a unit of territorial administration and local government (powiat) in Subcarpathian Voivodeship, south-eastern Poland, on the border with Ukraine. It came into being on January 1, 1999, as a result of the Polish local government reforms passed in 1998. Its administrative seat is the city of Przemyśl, although the city is not part of the county (it constitutes a separate city county).

The county covers an area of 1,213.73 square kilometres (468.6 sq mi). As of 2019 its total population is 74,234.

== Neighbouring counties ==
Apart from the city of Przemyśl, Przemyśl County is also bordered by Bieszczady County to the south, Lesko County to the south-west, Sanok County, Brzozów County and Rzeszów County to the west, and Przeworsk County and Jarosław County to the north. It also borders Ukraine to the east.

== Administrative divisions ==
The county is subdivided into 10 gminas. These are listed in the following table, in descending order of population.

Gmina	Type	Area (km^{2})	Population (2019)	Seat
Gmina Żurawica	rural	95.4	12,984	Żurawica
Gmina Przemyśl	rural	108.4	10,628	Przemyśl *
Gmina Dubiecko	urban-rural	154.3	9,186	Dubiecko
Gmina Orły	rural	70.1	8,882	Orły
Gmina Bircza	rural	254.5	6,582	Bircza
Gmina Medyka	rural	60.7	6,546	Medyka
Gmina Fredropol	rural	159.7	5,514	Fredropol
Gmina Krasiczyn	rural	127.2	5,188	Krasiczyn
Gmina Krzywcza	rural	94.5	4,843	Krzywcza
Gmina Stubno	rural	89.1	3,881	Stubno
* seat not part of the gmina

== Rural landscape pictures ==
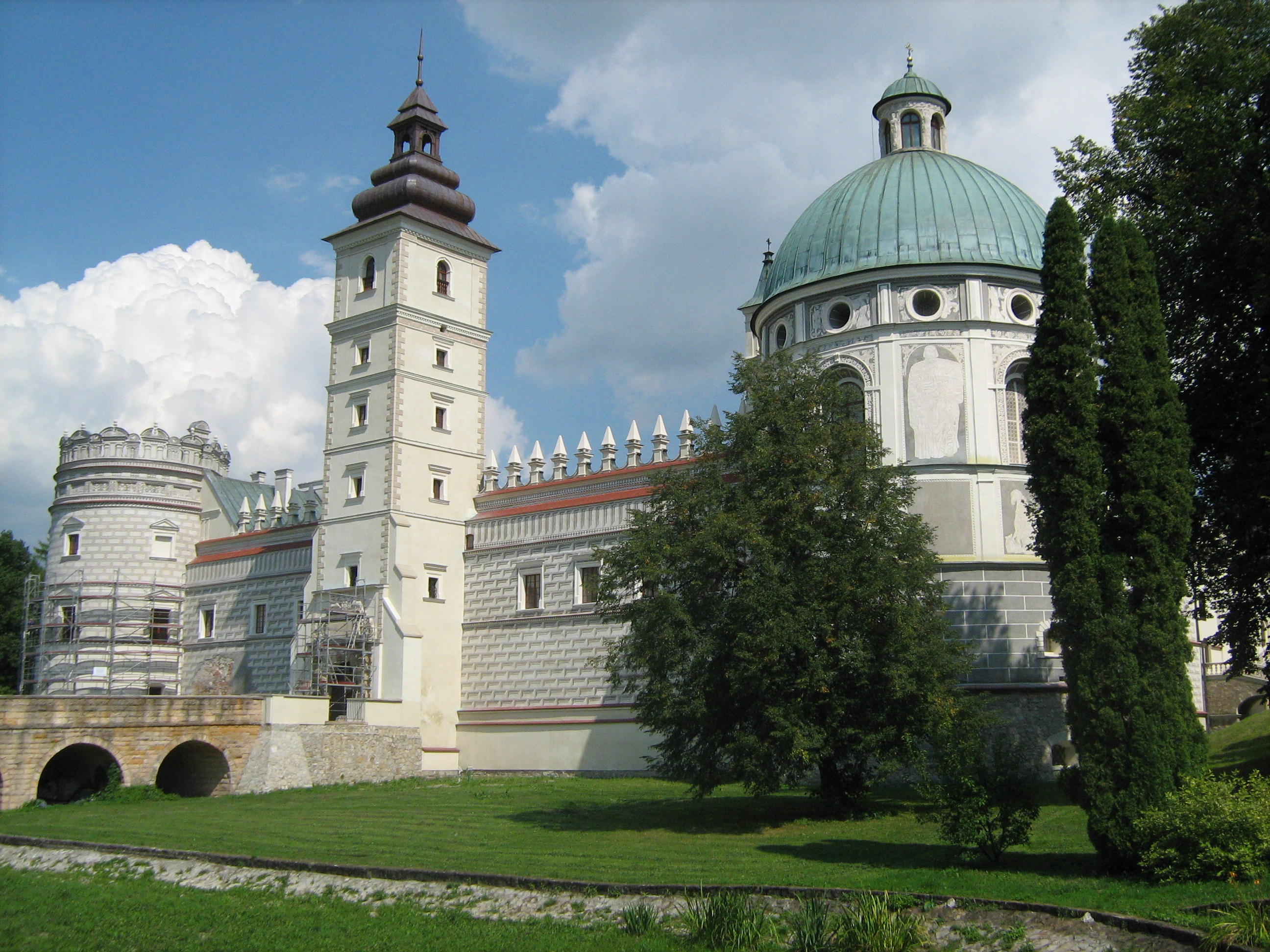

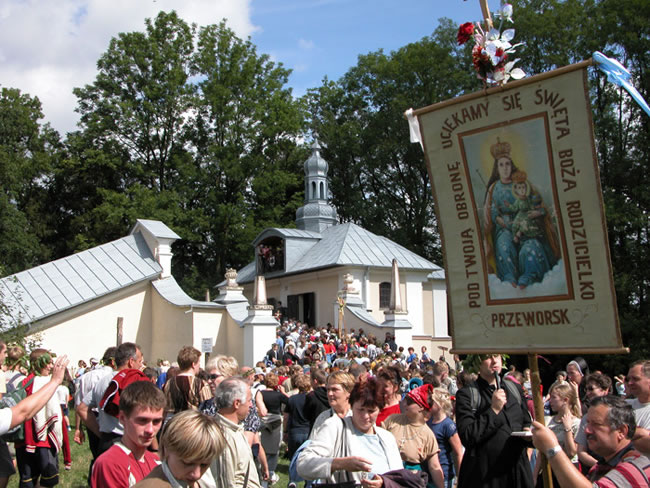

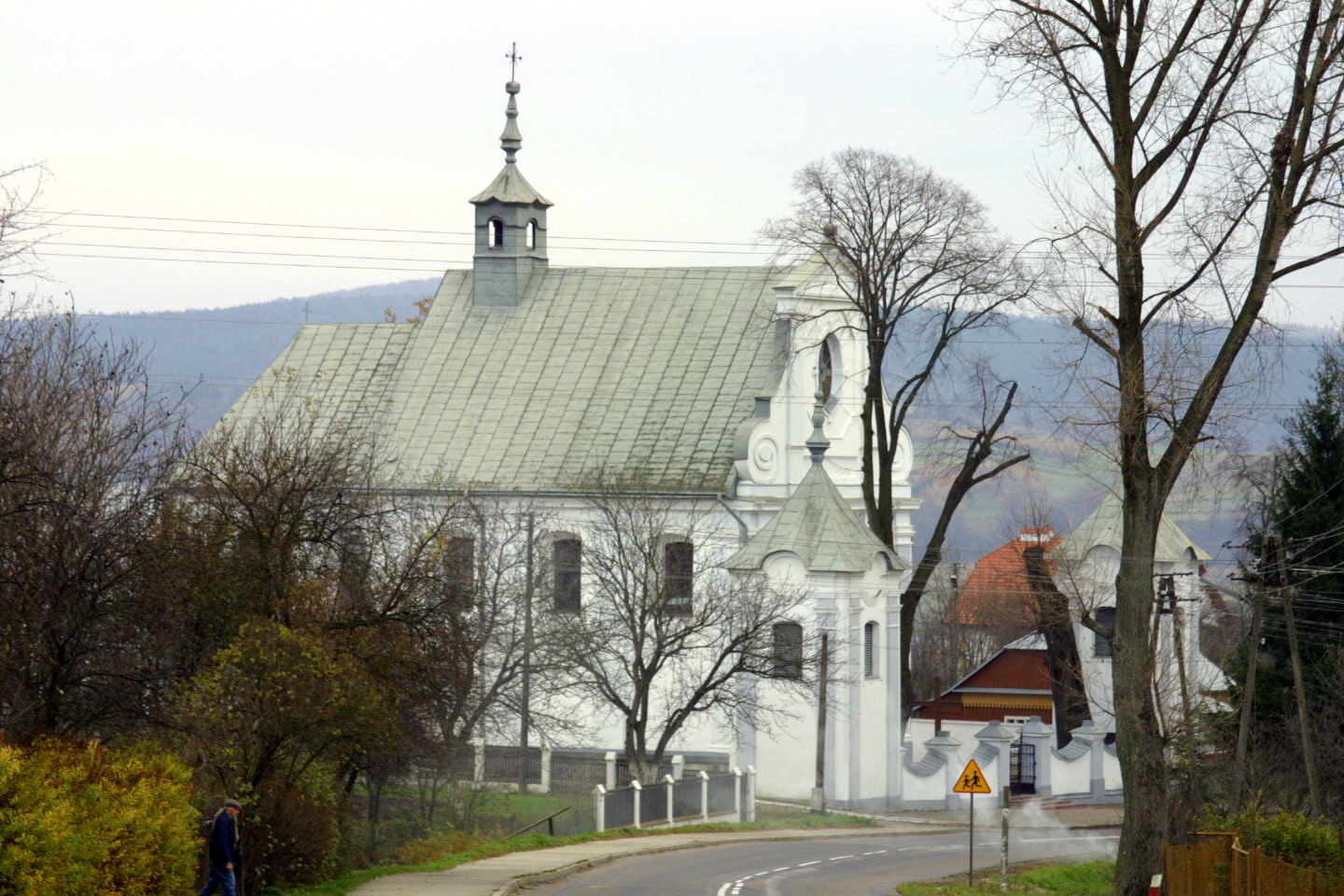

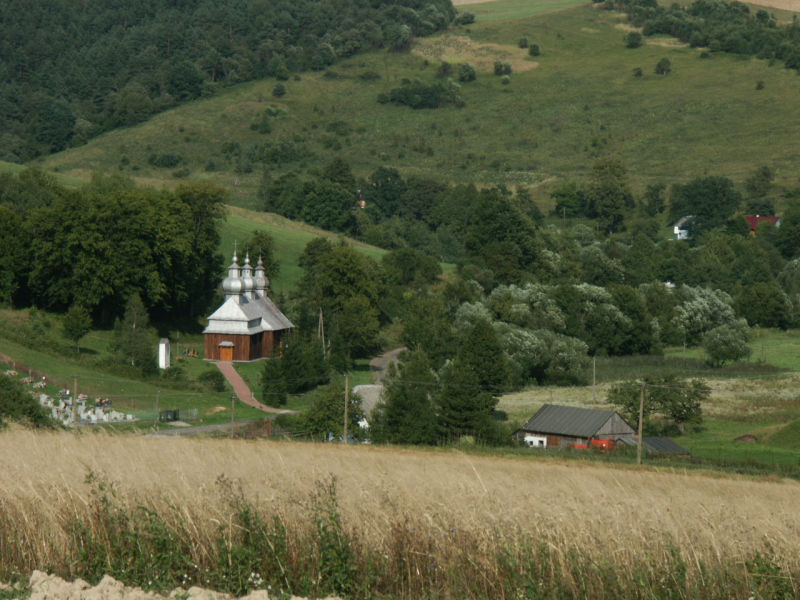

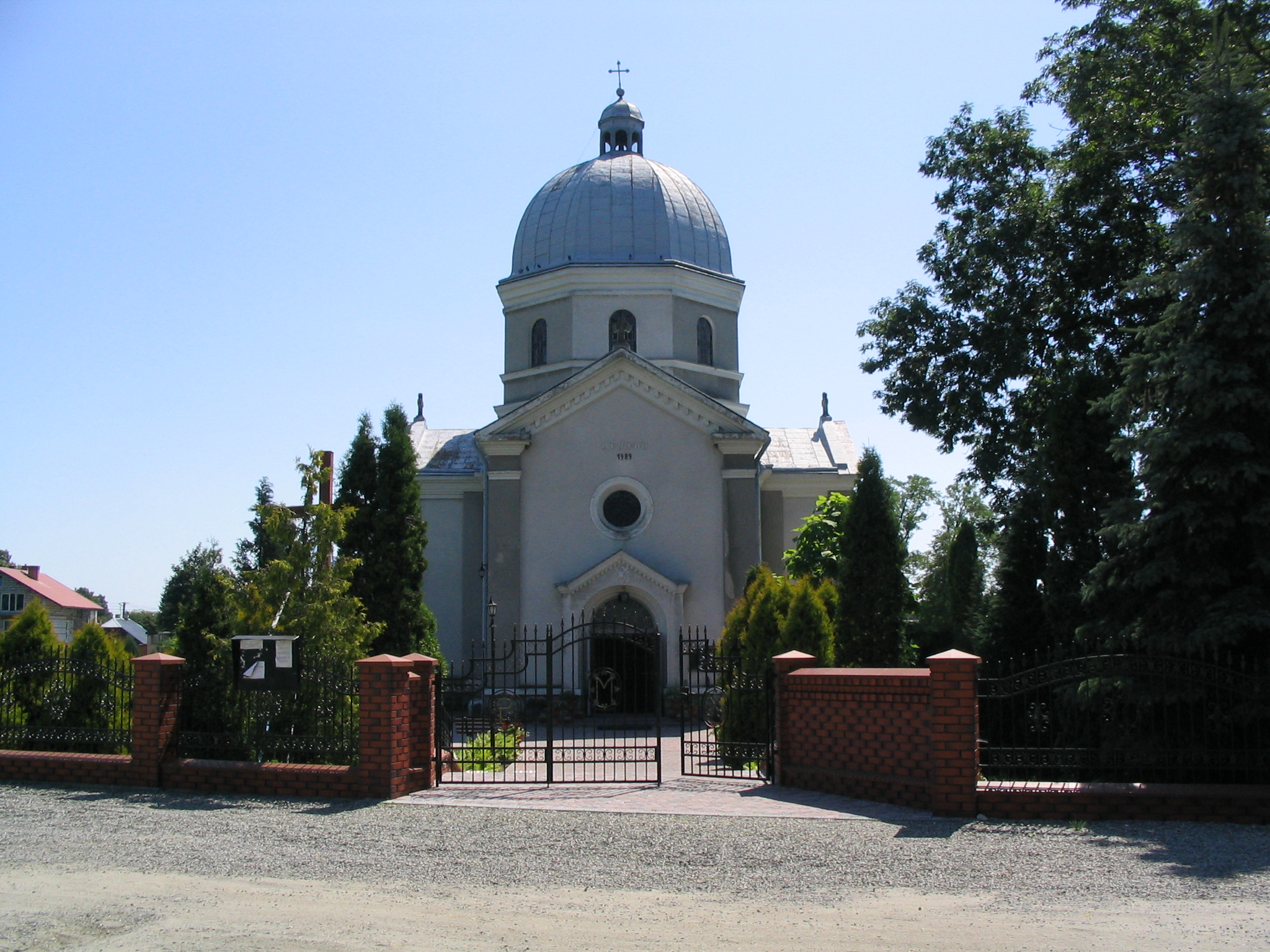

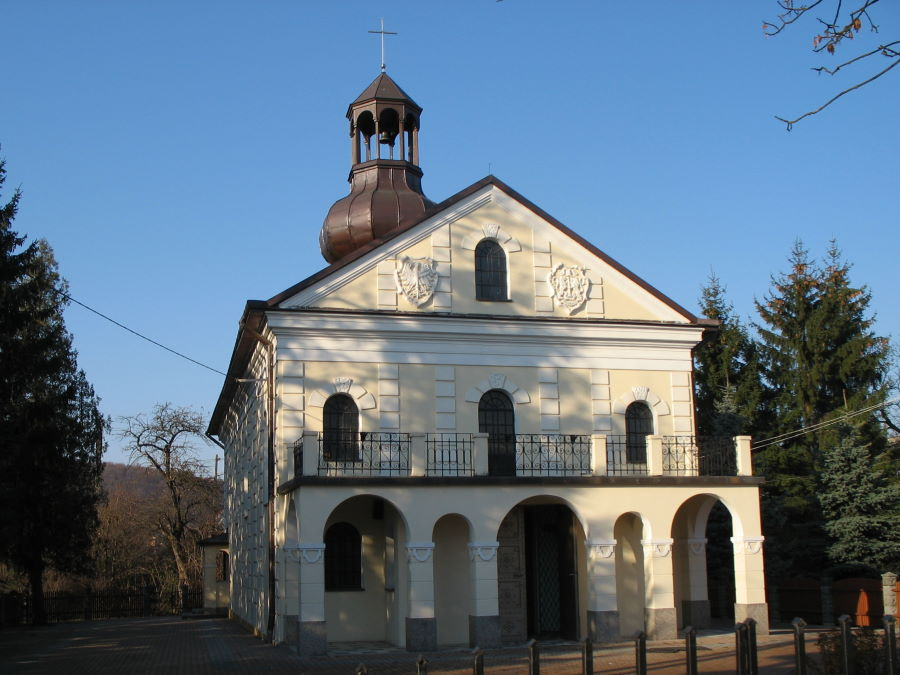

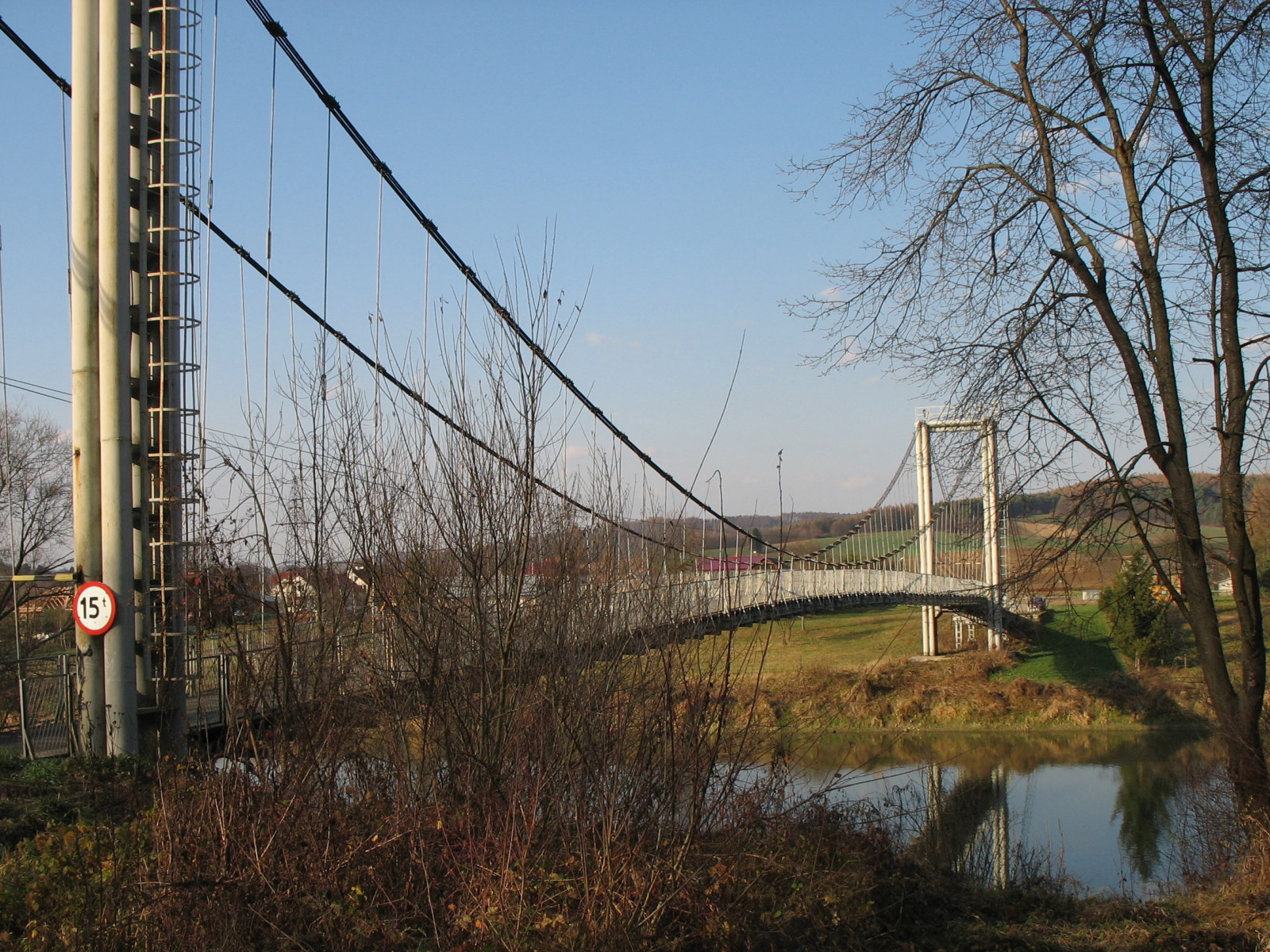

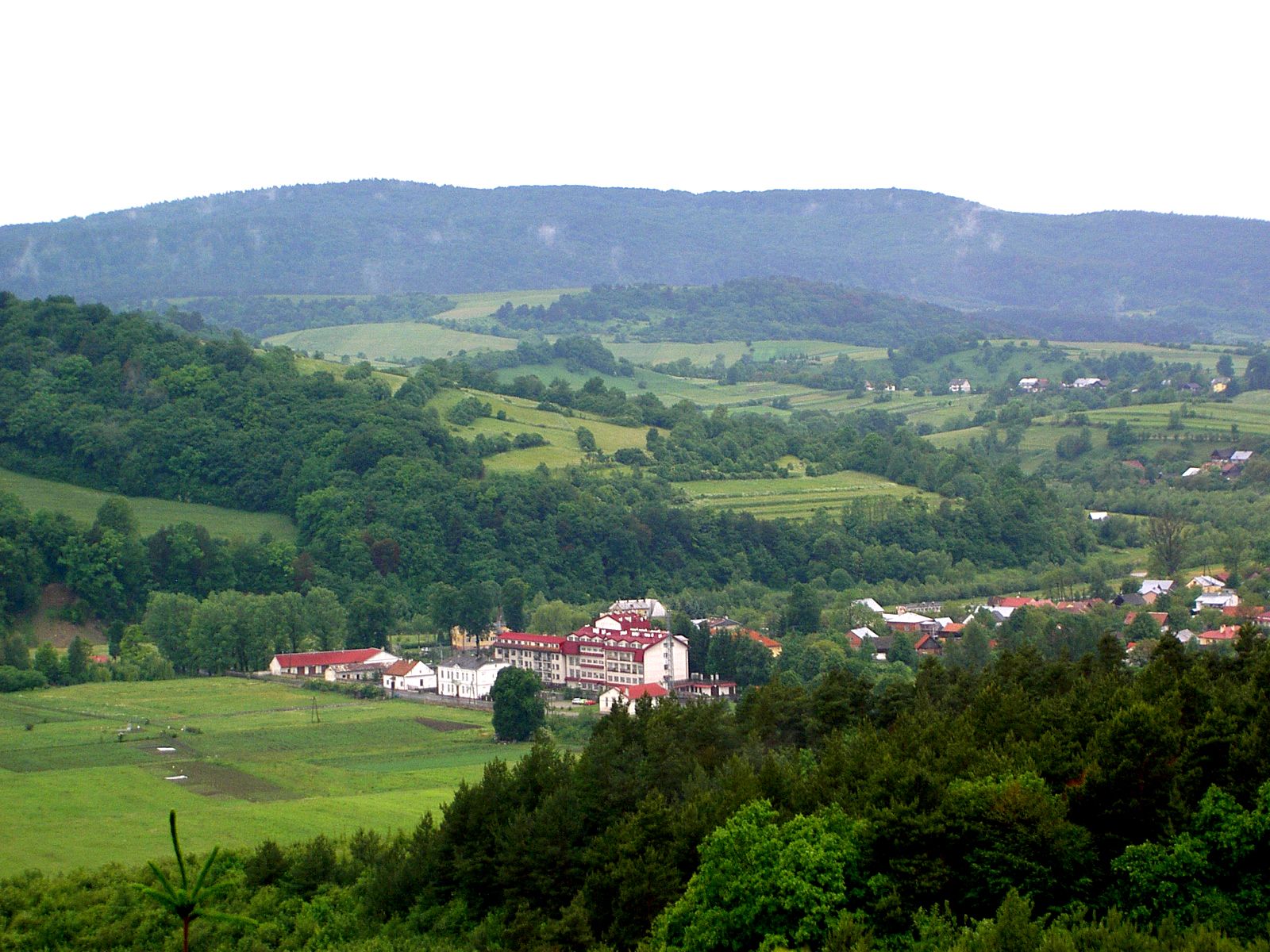

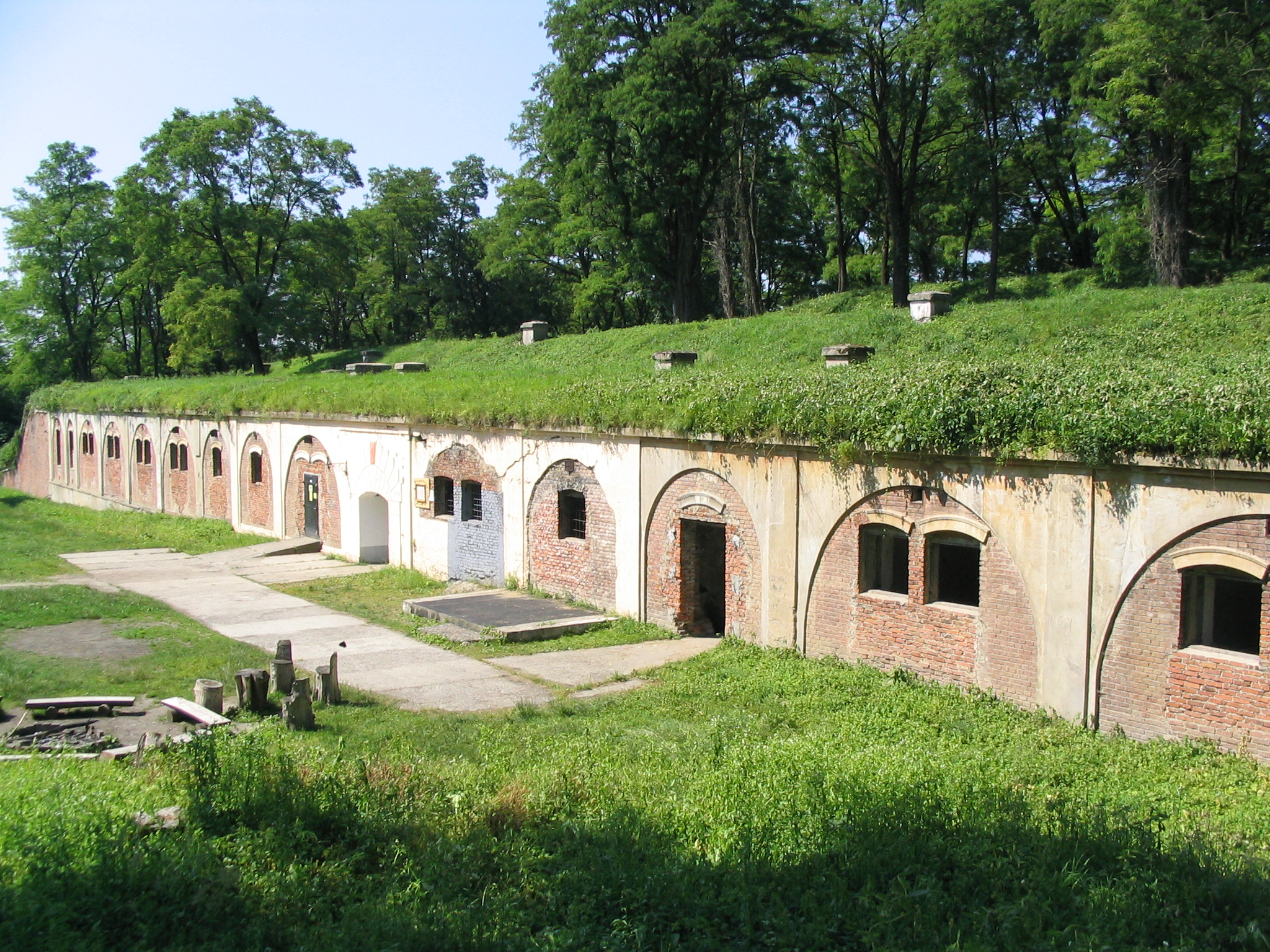
