= Cross of the Defence of Lwów =

Cross of the Defence of Lwów Krzyż Obrony Lwowa
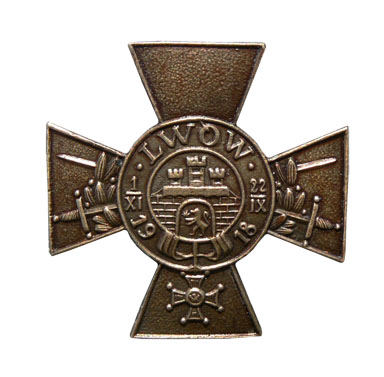
- Obverse of the Lwów Defence Cross with swords
- Established: 1918
- Country: Polish Second Republic

Cross of the Defence of Lwów (Polish: Krzyż Obrony Lwowa) – Is a Polish commemorative badge awarded for defending the city of Lviv from the 1–22 November 1918 during the Polish-Ukrainian War.

== Description ==
The badge is made from brass, in the centre of the cross, the coat of arms of Lviv are displayed. Inscription on the border: Lwow 1XI–22XI1918. On the lower arm of the cross, attached to the border with a ribbon. Its width and height is 40mm.

It was designed by Eugeniusz Marian Unger.

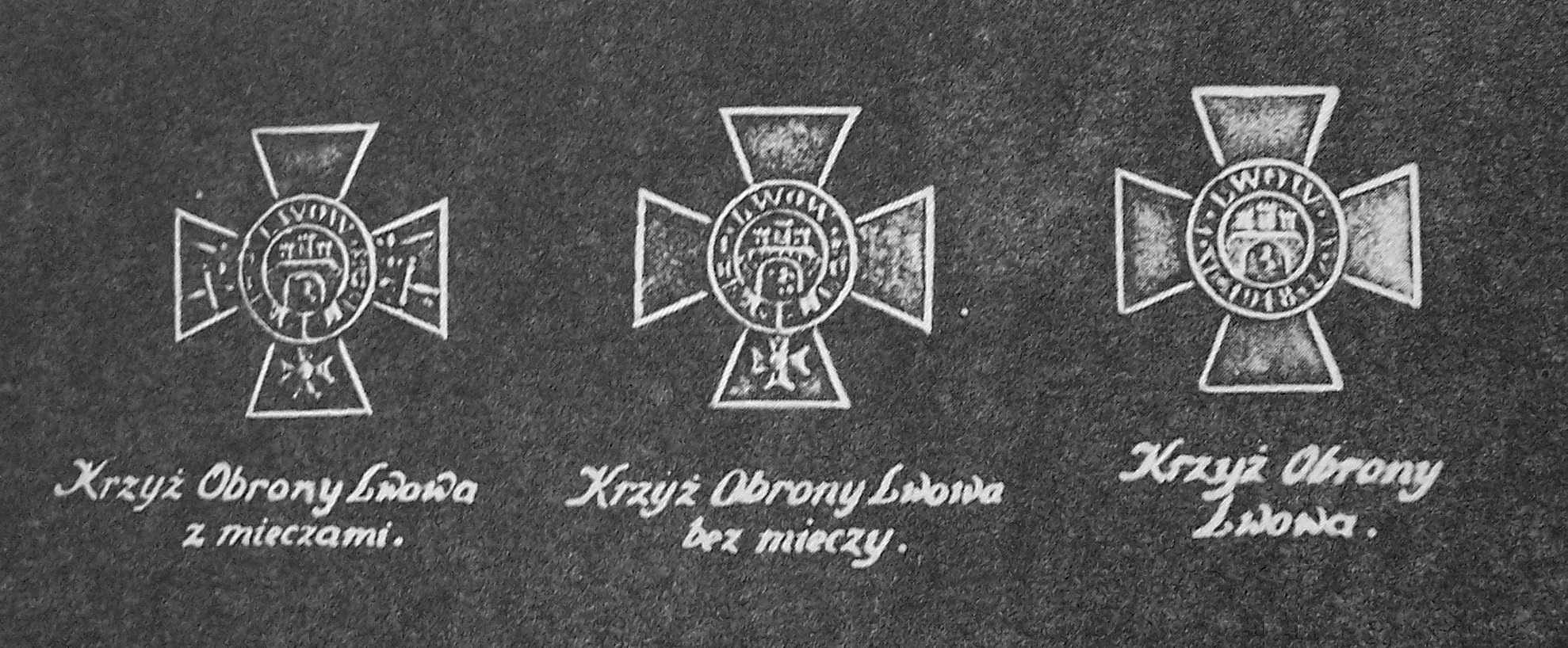
Different types of Cross of the Defence of Lwów from left to right: with swords, without swords and standard cross.

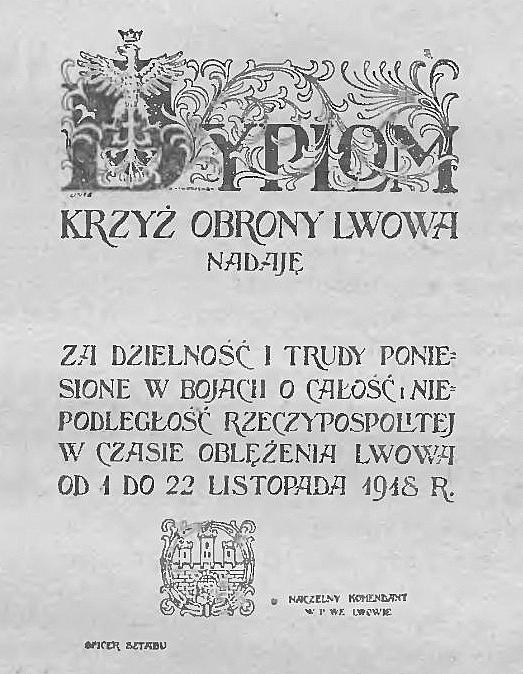
Diploma that would be given alongside the cross

== History ==
By order of 29 November 1918, the operational commander of the Polish Army "East", General Tadeusz Rozwadowski, established the "Defence of Lviv" commemorative badge in memory of the defence and relief of Lviv. The badge was designed by Warrant Officer Roman Woynicz-Horoszkiewicz, and awarded by the Supreme Military Command for Eastern Galicia.

The Cross of Defence of Lviv was awarded from 1919 (the decoration was received at the Artillery Inspectorate of the General District ‘Lviv’).

There were two types of decorations: the Cross of the Defence of Lviv with swords and the Cross of the Defence of Lviv without swords.

In the 1920s The chairman of the Chapter of the Cross of Defence of Lviv was Colonel Czesław Mączyński. and until 1939 the president of the Chapter of the Cross of Defence of Lviv was Major Lesław Węgrzynowski. Captain Tadeusz Michał Nittman, was also a member of the Chapter.

In March 1936, the Lviv Defence Association announced that the only commemorative badge for the period of fighting in defence of Lviv from 1 to 22 November 1918 was the Cross of the Defence of Lviv. In November 1936, the Chapter of the Cross of the Defence of Lviv passed a resolution to place the cross as a votive offering in the Church of Our Lady of the Gate of Dawn in Lviv.

On 25 May 1922, the Cross of the Defence of Lviv was unveiled at the Lviv railway station, which was the first Polish defence post in the city (the inscription on the monument reads: Fourth section of the defence of Lviv). On the fourth anniversary of the fighting, on 22 November 1922, an image of the Cross of the Defence of Lviv was unveiled on the façade of the building of St. Mary Magdalene School No. 11 in Lviv. On the fifth anniversary of the liberation of Lviv in November 1923, an emblem depicting the Cross of the Defence of Lviv was unveiled on the building of the cadet school in Lviv. On the sixth anniversary of the defence of Lviv at the end of 1924, the Cross of the Defence of Lviv was unveiled on the building of the then State Railway Directorate (now Lviv Railways). In 1931, the Cross of the Defence of Lviv was unveiled on the front wall of the TSL community centre in Lewandówka. As part of the celebrations marking the 16th anniversary of the liberation of Lviv on 22 November 1934, the Cross of the Defence of Lviv was placed in the building of the Jan and Andrzej Śniadecki State Secondary School No. XI in Lviv. On 11 November 1935, a commemorative plaque and the Cross of the Defence of Lviv were placed on the building of the Żółkiewski Girls' School. During the celebrations of the 17th anniversary of the relief of Lviv on 22 November 1935, the city's coat of arms, together with the Order of Virtuti Militari and the Cross of the Defence of Lviv, were unveiled on the Lviv City Hall building.

On the 20th anniversary of the battles for Lviv, in 1938, a resolution of the Lviv City Council changed the names of a number of streets in Lviv, introducing new patronages commemorating the defence of Lviv and its outstanding participants, while miniatures of the Cross of the Defence of Lviv were placed on the information plaques of these streets.

As part of the celebrations of the 50th anniversary of the defence of Lviv, organised by the Lviv émigré community in London on 2–3 November 1968, A commemorative badge marking the 50th anniversary of the Defence of Lviv, designed by Bogdan Sienicki, was issued, featuring a miniature replica of the Cross of the Defence of Lviv. On the occasion of the 60th anniversary of the defence of Lviv in 1978, activists from the Lviv Circle in London presented distinguished individuals with miniature Crosses of the Defence of Lviv along with certificates.

On 29 September 1981, the initiators of the creation of the Cross of the Defenders of Lviv approached General Mieczysław Boruta-Spiechowicz (the last living member of the Chapter of the Cross of the Defence of Lviv) for approval of the new decoration, who on 7 October 1981 approved the application for its establishment. The design of the cross was based on the Cross of the Defence of Lviv, but there were some differences: the symbol of Kotwica appeared on the upper arm, and the laurel leaves around the coat of arms were replaced with thorn branches.

== See also ==
- Commemorative badge "Orlęta"
- Lwów Eaglets
- Cemetery of the Defenders of Lwów
