= Commemorative badge "Orlęta" =

Commemorative badge "Orlęta" Odznaka pamiątkowa 'Orlęta'
- obverse

Awarded by General Tadeusz Rozwadowski
- Established: 18 March 1919; Approved 13 December 1921
- Country: Second Polish Republic
- Eligibility: Awarded to the Lwów Eaglets for the Defense of Lwów
- Status: Discontinued in 1928
- Founder: General Tadeusz Rozwadowski
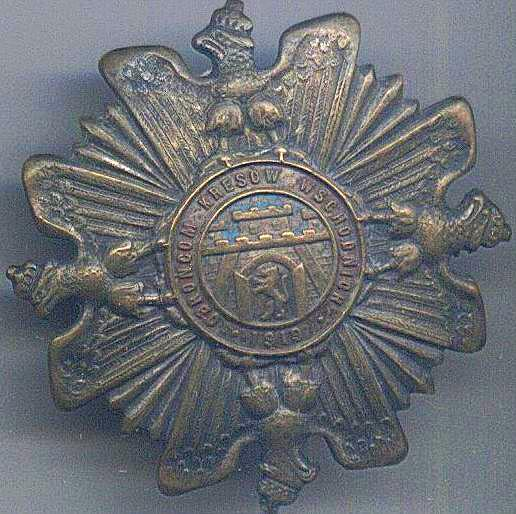
- obverse

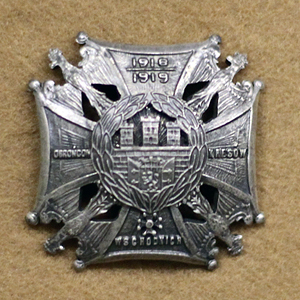
Commemorative badge ‘Orlęta’ (Note: It came in two varieties – enamelled for officers and non-commissioned officers, and un-enamelled for privates.)

The Commemorative badge ‘Orlęta’ (Polish: Odznaka pamiątkowa „Orlęta”) is a Commemorative badge awarded during the Second Polish Republic, to the Lwów Eaglets in the Defense of Lviv and the Eastern Borderlands during the Polish-Ukrainian War.

== Description ==
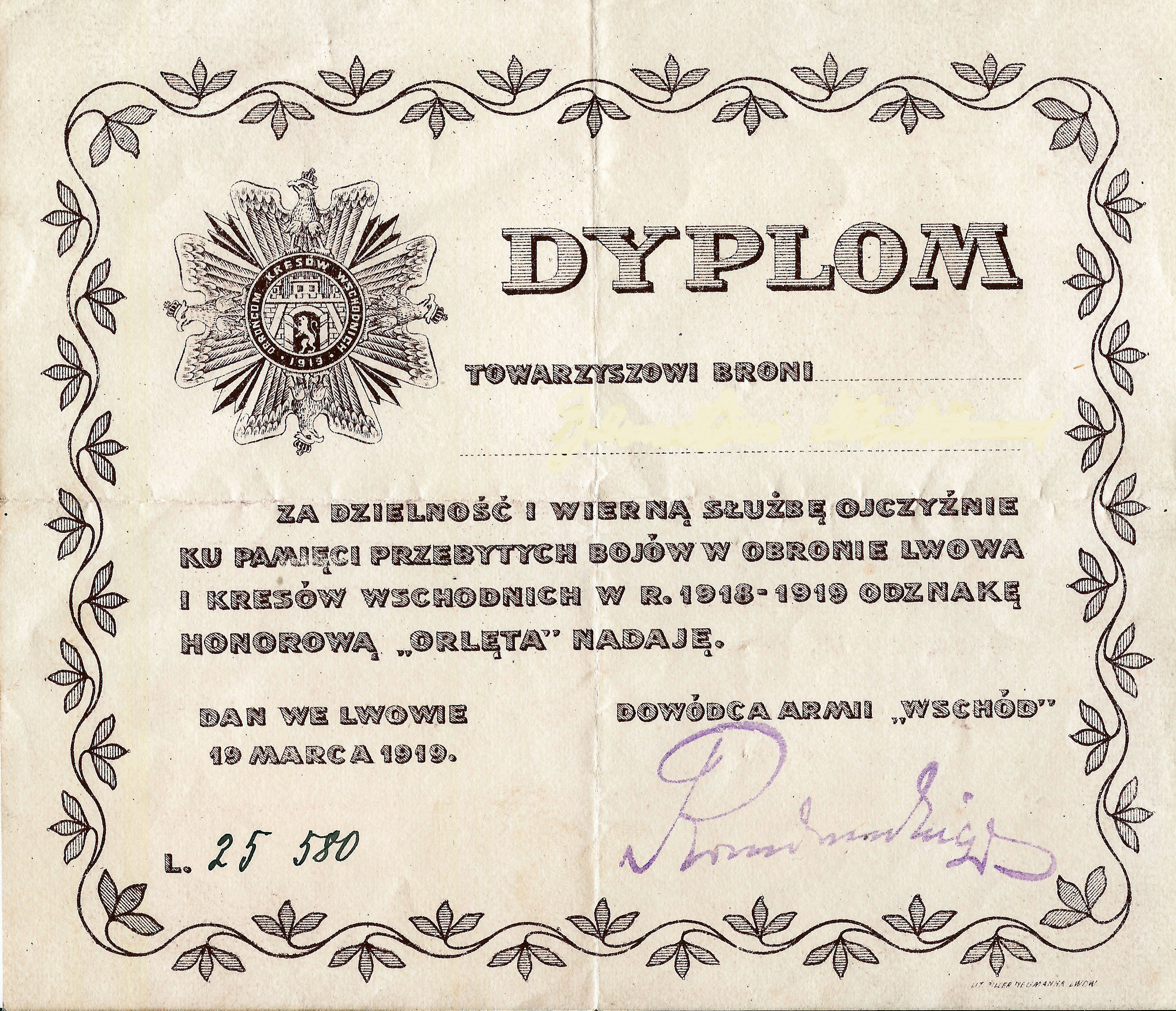
Diploma award that would be given alongside the badge.

The badge depicts four stylised silhouettes of eaglets forming the arms of a cross, with rays between them. In the centre of the badge, in a round medallion, is the coat of arms of Lviv, surrounded by the inscription ‘OBROŃCOM KRESÓW WSCHODNICH’ (Defenders of the Eastern Borderlands).

It was pressed from brass sheet metal, silver-plated and patinated. The badge is slightly convex. Its width and height is 44,4mm.

Everyone who received the badge also received a certificate of award signed personally by General Tadeusz Rozwadowski.

== History ==
The decoration was awarded for fighting in Defence of Lviv during its siege (for the period after 1–22 November 1918, for which the Cross of the Defence of Lwów was awarded) and for fighting for the Eastern Borderlands. The badge was established on 18 March 1919 by the commander of the ‘East’ Army, General Tadeusz Rozwadowski, for active military service in Eastern Galicia performed under his command until 19 March 1919. Rozwadowski general awarded the badge personally, along with his signature on the diploma. The badge was approved in the Journal of Orders of the Ministry of Military Affairs No. 49, item 872, dated 13 December 1921. After the death of General Rozwadowski in 1928, no one was authorised to award it. The badge was often the only reward that women involved in the defence of Lviv could hope for in various fields, not necessarily on the front line (including nurses and volunteers responsible for provisions and supplies).

The first badge design was created by T. Łuczyński and the second by Lesław Węgrzynowski. The badge was made by Władysław Buszek.

In a resolution dated 21 March 1936, the Provincial Board of the Federation of Polish Defenders of the Fatherland established a liquidation committee for the commemorative badge ‘Orlęta’.

In January 1938, the ‘Orlęta’ badge registry began operating at 5 Szopena Street in Lviv.

== See also ==
- Recipients of the commemorative badge Orlęta
- Lwów Eaglets
- Cemetery of the Defenders of Lwów
- Cross of the Defence of Lwów
