= Battle of Przemyśl (1918) =

Battle of the Polish-Ukrainian War

- Part of Polish–Ukrainian War
Date	November 2–12, 1918
Location	Przemyśl, Galicia (now Poland)
Result	Polish victory

Belligerents
(Ukraine) West Ukrainian People's Republic	(Poland) Second Polish Republic

Commanders and leaders
	Stanisław Puchalski; Julian Stachiewicz

Strength
Unknown (several hundreds)	Several dozens (initial); 1,367 men plus 379 reinforcements sent from Kraków (Final)

Casualties and losses
Several dozens dead and wounded	Several dozens dead and wounded

The Battle of Przemyśl was a struggle between Ukrainian and Polish militias and regular troops for the control over the city of Przemyśl in former Austro-Hungarian Galicia and local river crossings on the San river, from 2 to 12 November 1918, during the Polish-Ukrainian War.

== Background ==
In 1918 the city of Przemyśl (Ukrainian: Peremyshl) formed a part of the Austrian province Kingdom of Galicia and Lodomeria and was its third biggest city after Kraków and Lviv (Polish: Lwów, German: Lemberg). It was also the biggest Austro-Hungarian fortress north of the Carpathians (and the site of a 1914-1915 famous siege in World War I), and contained key road and railway crossings on the San River, linking Kraków and Lwów (Lviv).

Many nationalities lived in Galicia, but Poles were dominant, next followed by Ukrainians with a significant Jewish minority. Galicia was divided into eastern and western parts, with Przemyśl itself and its county belonging to Eastern Galicia. The western part was overwhelmingly Polish while the eastern part was ethnically more mixed. Ukrainians dominated the rural areas, while ethnic Poles were a majority in the cities, which also contained a substantial Jewish minority. There were also many Polish villages in the eastern part; Poles were the majority in the countryside around Przemyśl, Lviv and Ternopil. At the turn of the 20th century Poles constituted 88.7% of the population of Western Galicia, Jews 7.6%, Ukrainians 3.2%, Germans 0.3% and others 0.2%. The population data for Eastern Galicia was Ukrainians 60.5%, Poles 27.0%, Jews 11.7%, Germans 0.3% and others 0.5%.

According to the Austro-Hungarian census of 1910, Przemyśl had 54,692 permanent inhabitants, of whom 47% were Roman Catholics, 30% Jews and 22% Greek Catholics. 87% of the inhabitants of Przemyśl spoke Polish.

In the waning days of the Habsburg Empire, both Polish and Ukrainian populations were preparing to form their own separate states in the former Austrian territories. The mixed ethnic populations resulted in large parts of Galicia being perceived as Polish or Ukrainian simultaneously, which was the main reason for the coming conflict.

== Conflict ==
Due to the collapse of the Habsburg monarchy, the soldiers garrisoning Przemyśl's fortress deserted in droves, and those not taking part in revolutionary activities were in the process of returning to their homelands. This, along with the disintegration of civil authority, created a vacuum in government. Polish, Jewish and Ukrainian areas of the city began to form their own militias, to protect their respective populations.

On the night of October 29 Gen. Stanislaw Puchalski, recently appointed by the Polish Regency Council to command Polish forces in Galicia, arrived in the city with the task of organizing Polish military forces and a civil administration. In response to what they perceived as a coming Polish takeover, approximately 600 mostly Ukrainian soldiers from the former Austro-Hungarian 9th Infantry Regiment, stationed in nearby Żurawica and led by Ukrainian nationalists supporting the Ukrainian National Rada (UNR) movement, marched into the city, seizing military strongpoints and interning non-Ukrainian military personnel. Soon afterward, however, most of the Ukrainian troops left the city and headed home.

On the night of October 31/November 1, 1918, the Ukrainian National Rada in Lviv issued a proclamation in the name of the Ukrainian state in Galicia. Immediately afterward Ukrainian forces attempted to seize Lviv, resulting in the uprising of Lviv's Polish majority, which continued into 1919. Ukrainian nationalists also attempted a takeover of Przemyśl, but they lacked sufficient troops to accomplish that goal and soon halted the action. The ongoing battle in Lviv and the attempt to seize Przemyśl further contributed to the antagonisms between Ukrainian and Polish residents in the city. Polish fighters from Polish Military Organisation (POW) began to seize the city's key points, such as the railroad station. By the end of November 1 most of Przemyśl's crucial areas were in Polish hands.

To forestall further clashes, cease-fire talks were started between the two sides. The Poles were represented by Aleksander Skarbek and Zygmunt Lasocki, while the Ukrainians were represented by Volodymyr Zahaikevych. An agreement was soon reached, and a bilateral commission was created to govern the city. The commission was composed of four Polish and four Ukrainian members and also included one representative of Przemyśl's Jewish community. A mixed Polish-Ukrainian-Jewish police force was formed to maintain order within the city. However, this did not stop the growing tensions, which eventually resulted in demonstrations and sporadic clashes that resulted in injuries and deaths on both sides.

On the night of November 3/4, 220 armed Ukrainian farmers from the nearby villages of Medyka, Nehrybka, Pikulice and Sielec arrived in Przemyśl. Supported by the local Ukrainian militia and a group of 30 Ukrainian Sich Riflemen, they drove Polish forces out of the city center, and by 4:00 a.m. the Ukrainians controlled the eastern half of the city. They captured Puchalski and his staff and placed them in custody. The city's west bank known as the Zasanie, was still in Polish hands, defended by POW soldiers led by Lt. Leon Kozubski, together with a mixed force of volunteers—mostly scouts—students and youngsters. They were later dubbed the "Przemyśl Eaglets" (Polish: Orlęta Przemyskie), in honor of the more famous Lwów Eaglets.

On November 4 a cease-fire was signed in which the Ukrainians agreed to release detained Polish officers, including Gen. Puchalski, and turn over a portion of food rations from the fortress' stores to the Polish side. The San River was to form a provisional demarcation line. The armistice was not kept very long, however, and clashes between both sides continued, including a Ukrainian attempt to cross the river on November 6. On November 10 approximately 400 Polish reinforcements from Kraków (the so-called "San Group") with four artillery pieces arrived by train, commanded by Julian Stachiewicz. The armored train Śmiały also accompanied the troops. On November 11 an ultimatum was issued by the Polish leadership in which they demanded that the Ukrainian forces withdraw from Przemyśl, effectively ceding control of the city to the Poles. The ultimatum was rejected, and at noon on November 11 Polish forces unleashed an artillery barrage on the Ukrainian-controlled right bank of the San. This was followed by Polish forces using the bridges across the river—which the Ukrainians had failed to blow up—to assault the city. By that evening the Poles had taken over the main railway station, the market square and most of the town itself. By November 12 all Ukrainian forces had either withdrawn from or had been driven out of the city.

The successful takeover of Przemyśl enabled the Poles to send reinforcements to the besieged Lviv—which up to that time was virtually cut off from central Poland—via the Przemyśl-Lviv railway line, enabling them to eventually free the city.

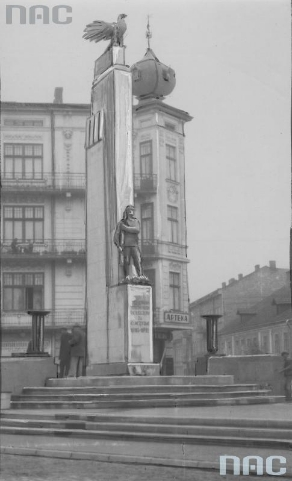
Monument to the Przemyśl Eaglets first erected in 1938

== Sources ==
- Michał Klimecki - "Polsko-ukraińska wojna o Lwów i Galicję Wschodnią 1918-1919", Warszawa 2000, ISBN 83-7233-145-6.
- Obrona Przemyśla w 1918 roku (in Polish).
