= Pikulice =

- Village
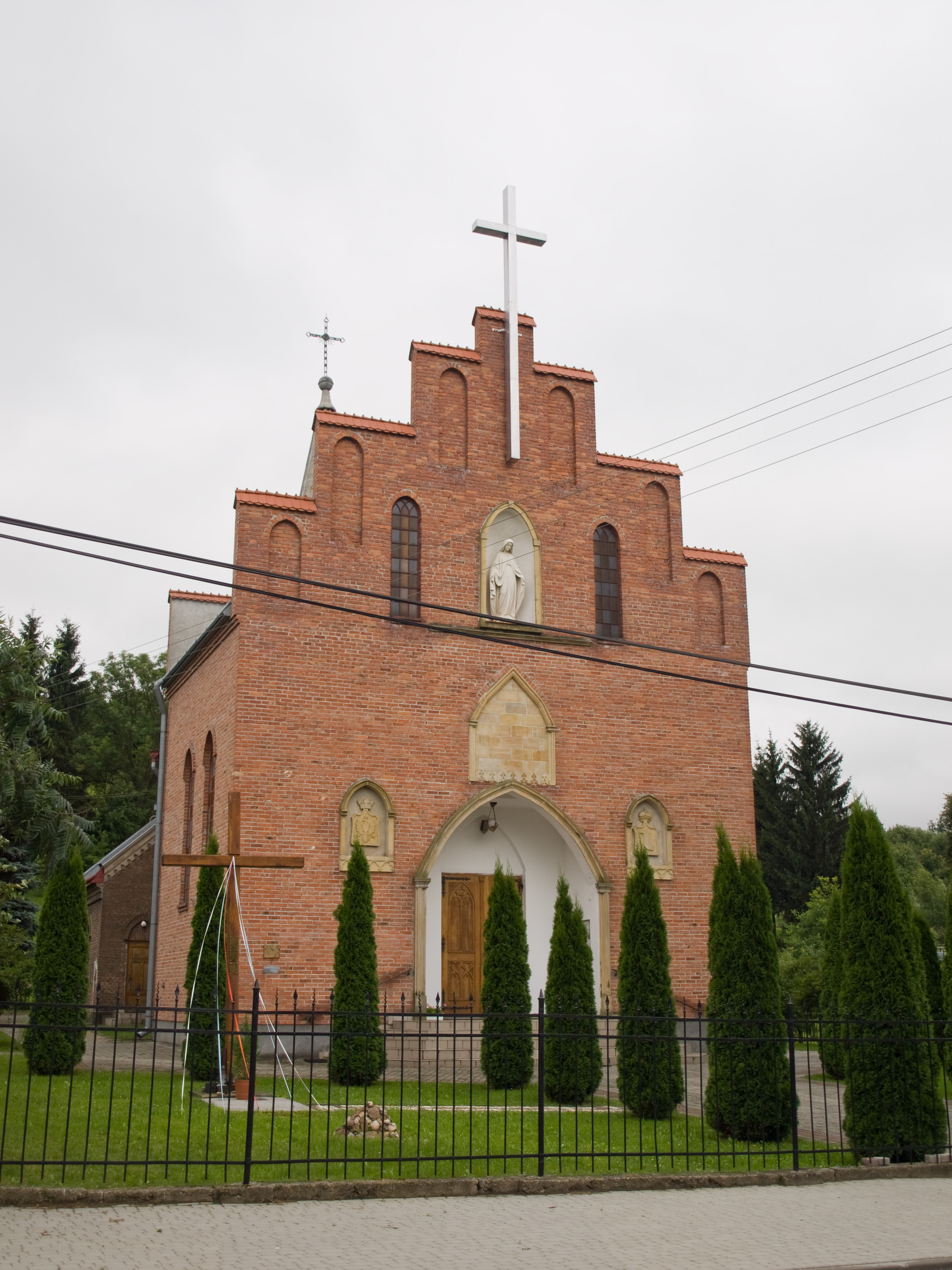
- Church of Blessed Jakub Strzemię

- Location within Poland
- Coordinates: 49°45′N 22°47′E
- Country: Poland
- Voivodeship: Subcarpathian
- County: Przemyśl
- Gmina: Przemyśl
- Time zone: UTC+1 (CET)
  - Summer (DST): UTC+2 (CEST)
- Vehicle registration: RPR

Pikulice [pikuˈlit͡sɛ] is a village in the administrative district of Gmina Przemyśl, within Przemyśl County, Subcarpathian Voivodeship, in south-eastern Poland, close to the border with Ukraine.

== Geography ==
Pikulice is situated by the streams Jawor and Wisla, which enter the Wiar River. To the east is Nehrybka, to the southeast Hermanowice, to the southwest Grochowe, and to the west Kruhel Wielki.

== History ==
In the 14th century, the lands of Pikulice belonged to Przemyśl and the city's Roman Catholic bishop. In 1389, Władysław II Jagiełło granted the city one hundred Franconian fiefs. The following century, the village was incorporated by the starosta of Przemyśl, this according to a document dated October 29, 1408. Władysław II Jagiełło freed the residents of the village from all taxes and weights. In 1418, Ivan of Obychow, the Rus starosta and the castellan of Szremsk, carried out royal orders to distinguish between the city outskirts and the villages Pikulice, Grochowe, Witoszyńce, and Koniuchy.

Austria, following the First Partition of Poland in 1772, granted Pikulice along with other surrounding villages to Count Ignacy Cetner. South of Pikulice, in Bakończyce, manorial-estate buildings still stand. The last owner of the estate and local assets was Princess Karolina Emilia Lubomirska. Following World War I, Poland regained independence and control of the village.

Under German occupation during World War II, the German army carried out the first local mass executions of Jews on September 16 and 19, 1939, at several places in the outskirts of Przemyśl, including Pikulice. The German administration operated a subcamp of the Stalag 327 prisoner-of-war camp at the pre-war Polish Army barracks in Pikulice, with mass graves of Italian POWs unearthed in 1961.

Soviet-installed Polish communist authorities rounded up and deported most of the Ukrainian population in the summer 1945 to Soviet Ukraine. On November 15, 1945, Ukrainian partisans burned down most of the village buildings. The remaining Ukrainians, some fifteen, were resettled in Western Poland in May 1947.

== Religion ==
The first mention of a local parish church dates from 1507. A Basilian monastery was in Pikulice in the 16th century.

The Roman Catholic villagers belonged to the parish in Przemyśl until a neo-Gothic stone church and belfry were erected for their spiritual needs in Pikulice in 1912. The Greek Catholic villagers had their own parish in nearby Nehrybka, and an affiliate church in Pikulice, The Greek Catholic church in Pikulice was originally a wooden structure constructed around 1830. In 1841, this church building was replaced by another wooden structure, which, in 1903, was reconstructed as a masonry building. The church was named the Nativity of the Blessed Virgin Mary. It was demolished in the 1950s following the resettlement of the remaining Ukrainian population to Soviet Ukraine. The Roman Catholic Church of the Sacred Heart of Jesus and Blessed Jakub Strzemię remains. The façade of this church is decorated with an emblem displaying the Polish eagle, the crest of the Lubomirski family, and the figure of Saint John the Baptist, who is the patron saint of Przemyśl.

== Population ==
The population of Pikulice, in the mid 16th century, in 1565, counted 36 peasant families, one miller, two innkeepers, and one Orthodox priest.

Two centuries later, in 1785, under Austrian rule, the population numbered 330 individuals of which the large majority (88%) were Greek Catholics. There numbered 291 Greek Catholics, 25 Roman Catholics, and 14 Jews.

By 1880, according to the Austrian census, the village's population had nearly doubled to 672 residents, of them,105 were Roman Catholics. Two decades later, in 1900, the inhabitants numbered 959. Of this total, 630 were Greek catholics, 202 were Roman Catholics, and 127 were Jewish.

The village population declined following World War I. In 1921, the Polish census listed 151 houses and 875 inhabitants: 607 Greek Catholics, 199 Roman Catholics, and 68 Jews.

In 1938, the population of Pikulice numbered 1390: 750 Ukrainians, 230 Poles, 250 Polish colonists, 100 Latynnyky (Ukrainian Roman Catholics), and 60 Jews.

== Landmarks ==
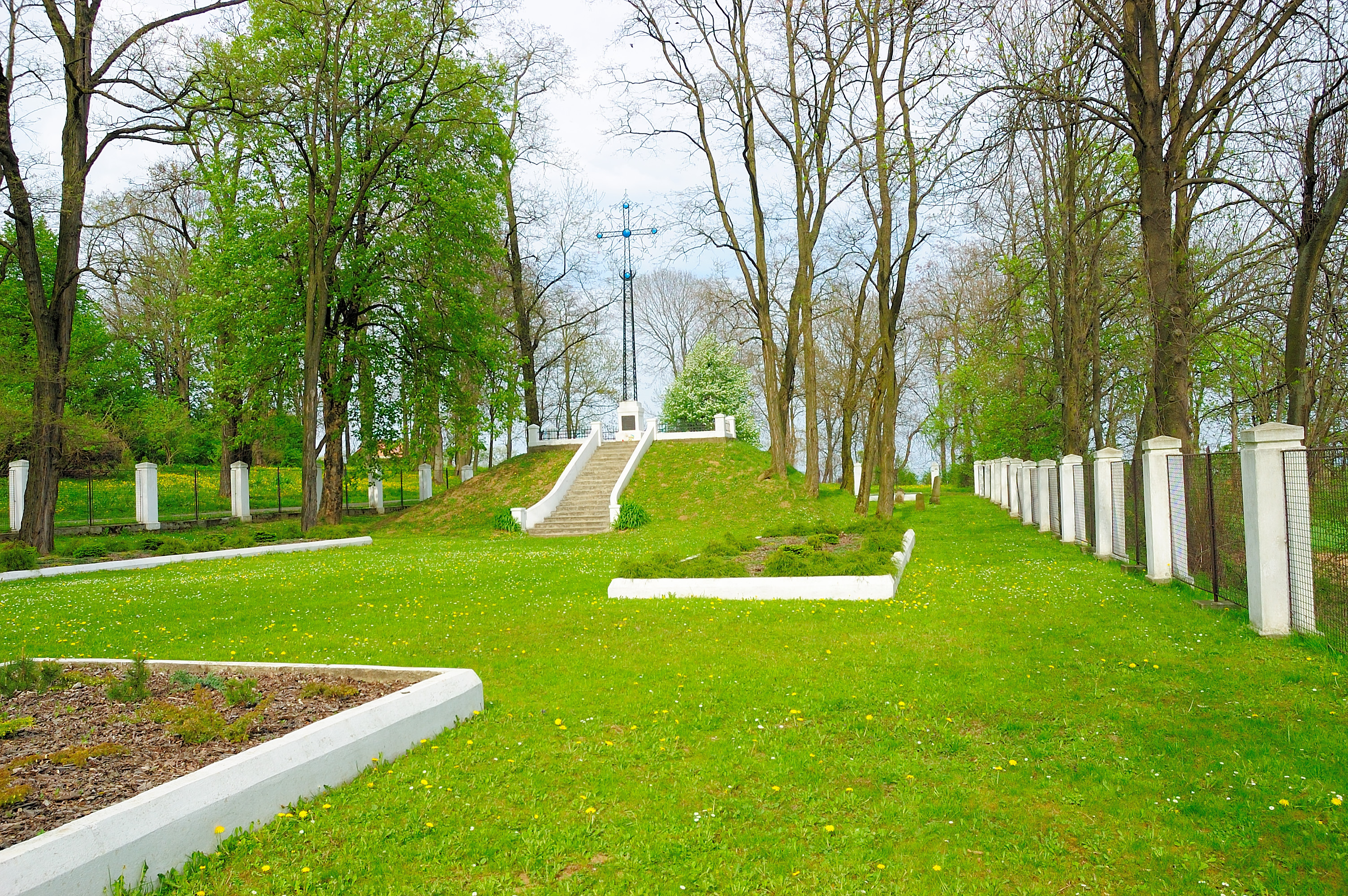
Ukrainian War Cemetery in Pikulice, Poland

To the north of Pikulice's center, there stands a monument which honors the memory of the soldiers of the Ukrainian Galician Army who participated in the Polish-Ukrainian War of 1918–1919. Polish authorities interned them as prisoners of war at a makeshift camp and detention center located in former Austrian barracks. Several thousand of them died between 1919 and 1920 from outbreaks of typhus and diphtheria. They were buried in mass graves at an Austrian war cemetery. Under communist Poland, this cemetery was destroyed in the 1960s. It was reconstructed in the 1980s. In 2000, 47 former soldiers of the Ukrainian Insurgent Army were exhumed from mass graves in Bircza and reburied at the Ukrainian military cemetery. In a tradition dating back to the 1921, Ukrainians, since 1990, hold an annual mourning procession from Przemyśl's city center to the Pikulice graveyard on the Sunday after Pentecost.

Atop the burial mound at the cemetery there is erected an iron cross created by the local Ukrainian artist Olena Kulchytska and reconstructed in 1990.
