= Leopold Lis-Kula =

Polish army colonel

Leopold Lis-Kula (nom de guerre Lis "Fox") was a Colonel of Infantry of the Polish Army, and recipient of the Virtuti Militari. Lis Kula was born on 11 November 1896, in the village of Kosina near Łańcut (Austrian Galicia), and died on 7 March 1919, in the village of Torczyn near Lutsk, Volhynia, during the Polish–Ukrainian War.

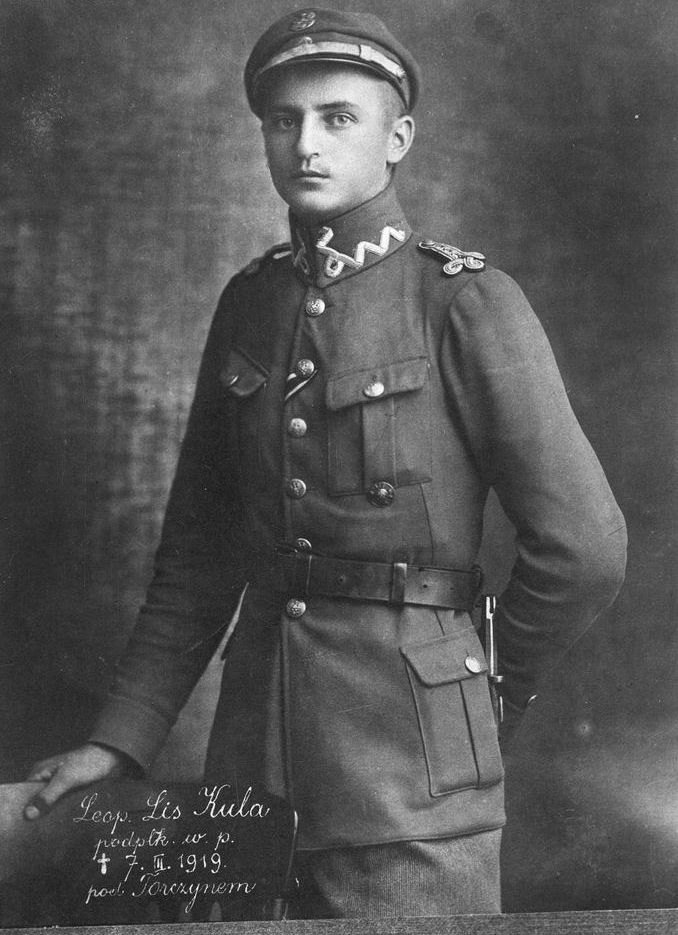
Leopold Lis-Kula

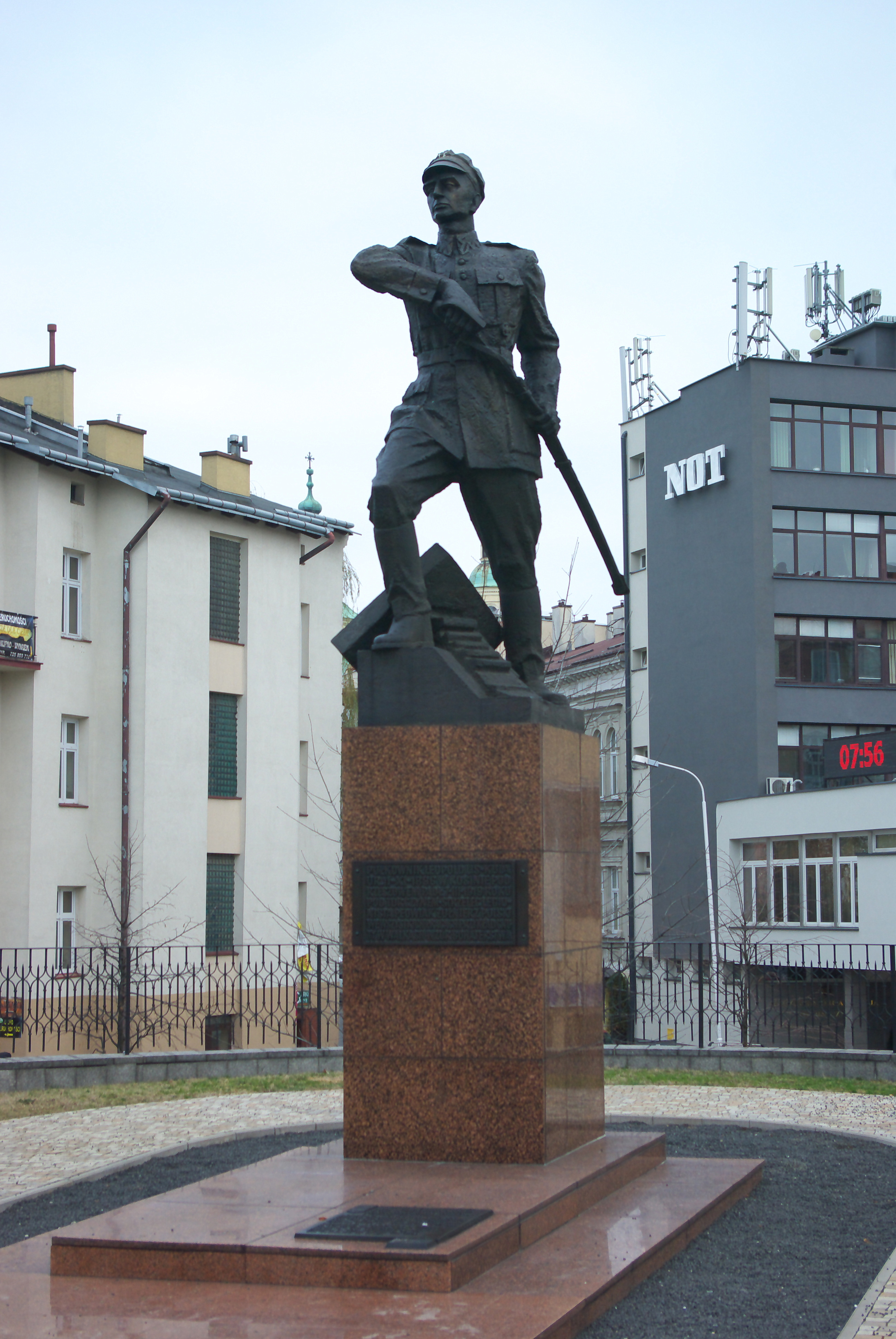
Monument in Rzeszów

== Biography ==
His father Tomasz Kula was a railway worker, while mother Elzbieta née Czajowska was a housewife. Leopold was their fourth child, and to provide better education for the children the family moved to Rzeszów in ca. 1910. Altogether, Tomasz and Elzbieta had eight children.

Young Leopold, raised in a patriotic spirit by his mother, attended Austrian State Gymnasium II, which now is a high school named after him. He was an average student, who liked to cut classes: in spring 1911, on a day when Leopold decided not to go to school, he founded a secret youth organization, and soon afterwards, he joined boy scouts. In November 1911, Andrzej Małkowski, the father of Polish boy scouting in Galicia, came to Rzeszów. During a meeting with local teenagers, Leopold Kula took on a nickname "Lis" ("Fox").

By spring 1912, Kula was one of main members of patriotic youth organizations in Rzeszów. Together with other teens, he practiced military training in forests around Głogów Małopolski and Tyczyn. Some time in 1912, he left boy scouting and joined Riflemen's Association. In summer 1912, the association organized secret training camp near Jasło. Józef Piłsudski, who attended the event, personally talked with Lis-Kula, congratulating the young activist on his skills and enthusiasm. Recommended by Pilsudski, Kula was sent to Zakopane, where he completed summer officer school of the Riflemen's Association. In 1913, Leopold, who as 16 at that time was named deputy commandant of Rzeszów branch of the association.

On 5 August 1914, together with a group of riflemen, Kula came to Kraków where he was named commandant of the 4th Company of a group of Mieczyslaw Trojanowski. In the fall of that year, Kula took part in the First Cadre Company's fighting against Russians in the area of Kielce. On 9 October 1914, he was promoted to the rank of Podporucznik (second lieutenant), by Józef Piłsudski and Kazimierz Sosnkowski. 18-year-old Leopold then fought in the battles of Krzywoploty and Łowczówek (November – December 1914). He was generally regarded as an excellent and courageous leader.

In spring of 1915, together with 1st Brigade, Polish Legions, Lis crossed the Vistula river, moving eastwards, to Volhynia. In his spare time, Leopold studied French language and read works of Kant, Nietzsche and Spinoza. In January 1915, during a leave in Wadowice, he completed final high school exams. In 1917, after the so-called Oath crisis, Kula was interned, and then drafted into Austrian Army, which sent him to the Italian Front.

Some time in 1918 Leopold returned to Galicia, and immediately busied himself with creation of Polish Army. He was of Pilsudski's favourite soldiers, and a very brave soldier. During the Polish–Ukrainian War, he fought both in Eastern Galicia and Volhynia, taking part among others in the Battle of Lwów (1918). In the night of 6/7 March 1919, Kula carried out a successful attack on a Volhynian town of Torczyn, which had been in Ukrainian hands. On 7 March he died from wounds he had received during the night battle.

Leopold Lis Kula was at that time regarded as one of the most gifted Polish officers. He was posthumously promoted to Colonel (Pułkownik), and his funeral, which took place in Rzeszów, turned into a patriotic demonstration. Kula was buried at Rzeszów's Pobitne Cemetery; among flowers placed on his coffin was a wreath that said "To my brave boy – Józef Piłsudski".

Lis was posthumously awarded Silver Cross of the Virtuti Militari and Cross of Independence (19 December 1930). Several streets and buildings were named after him, as well as an armoured train Lis-Kula (named so on 5 April 1919). In 1937, Warsaw's 5th Men Gymnasium was named after him, and on 8 March 1939, Polish Minister of Internal Affairs named a settlement near Torczyn "Kolonia Lisa-Kuli". Also in 1939, Lis-Kula was named patron of the 23rd Infantry Regiment from Wlodzimierz Wolynski. His monument is located in Rzeszów.

== Monument in Rzeszów ==
=== The circumstances of unveiling ===
The initiators of the foundation of the monument were comrades-in-arms and junior high school friends. The monument's construction committee, established in 1927, was headed by Aleksandra Piłsudska (the Marshal's wife). The creation of the monument was entrusted to the sculptor Professor Edward Witting. The monument was unveiled on 18 September 1932, by President Ignacy Mościcki. The ceremonies, which were opened by a field mass and ended with a parade, were attended by representatives of the generality, the Sejm and the Senate, the government, local authorities and about 40 thousand people (more than the city counted at the time).

=== Later history ===
In the pre-war period, the cult of Lis-Kula was very much alive. It became one of the most important personal models for the young generation of the time, promoted in the 1930s in the current curriculum of history teaching in primary and secondary schools. The Leopold Lis-Kula monument thus became not only one of the symbols of Rzeszów (the city the hero was associated with) but also a place of patriotic manifestations and anniversary celebrations. During World War II, Rzeszów was under German occupation. On the night of 10–11 April 1940, the monument was demolished. Before the remaining scrap was sent to Germany, the head of the monument was stolen, which was later stored in the basement of the Rzeszów Museum, where it is now presented. In the People's Republic of Poland, Lis-Kula was condemned to be forgotten, but thanks to the independence circles, the memory survived. The idea of rebuilding the monument was born in 1980, but it became possible only after the fall of communism in 1989. On the occasion of John Paul II's upcoming visit to Rzeszów in June 1991, it was decided that the statue of the Lis-Kula monument would be a gift from the Solidarity Region Board. The miniature was taken according to old photographs. A Committee for the Reconstruction of the Monument was also established. To raise funds, a reprint of a book about Lis-Kula from 1932 was published, which was distributed as a contribution in Poland and abroad. The competition to make a replica was won by sculptors from Kraków: Bogusz Salwiński and Janusz Wilczyński. The ceremony of unveiling and consecrating the monument on 22 November 1992, was attended by the president in exile Ryszard Kaczorowski. The monument, like the grave of Lis-Kula in the Rzeszów cemetery, has again become a place of collective memory.

=== Contemporary importance ===
National holidays and scouting celebrations are held at the monument. The tradition of solemn celebrations of the anniversary of the hero's death has been restored, which annually gather up to several thousand participants, including school delegations. It has also become an important meeting place for reborn "riflemen" associations (a paramilitary social and educational organization, referring to the structures operating during the struggle for independence). The monument is one of the points of the tourist-historical route between Kosina and Rzeszów from the length of 39 km, under the patronage of Colonel Lis-Kula. Its originator was the Podkarpacki Oddział Związku Piłsudczyków (Podkarpacki Branch of the Piłsudski Association) (an organization whose aim is to cultivate the Piłsudski and independence tradition and to educate patriotic and pro-defensive youth). On the trail, cyclical rallies are organized, which combine educational and educational goals with sports and fitness. The marches, which are to promote modern patriotism and defence issues, are accompanied by historical competitions, occasional concerts, historical talks, memories of Colonel L. Lis-Kula's relatives, sports competitions. The event is attended by school youth, riflemen, scouts, educators and tourists. Bicycle rallies are also organized.

== See also ==
- Lwów Eaglets
- Treaty of Riga
- Jerzy Bitschan
- Antoni Petrykiewicz

== Sources ==
- Franciszek Demel i Wacław Lipiński – Pułkownik Leopold Lis-Kula, z przedmową A.Piłsudskiej, Reprint wydania z 1932 r. Wyd. WRZG, Rzeszów 1990
- Piątek Andrzej – Powiew Legendy, Rzeszów 2004.
- Żurawiejki i inne zawadiackie piosenki legionowe – zbiór pieśni polskich z okresu 1914–1939.
- Wiktor Krzysztof Cygan, Słownik biograficzny oficerów Legionów Polski. T. 1. Gryf, Warszawa 1992.
- Bogusław Zaniewski – Wspomnienie o Leopoldzie Lisie-Kuli żołnierzu legionowej legendy, Wyd. Rubikon, Wrocław 2007.
- Monuments of Remembrance 1918–2018 – Monument to Colonel Leopold Lis-Kula.
