= Antoni Petrykiewicz =

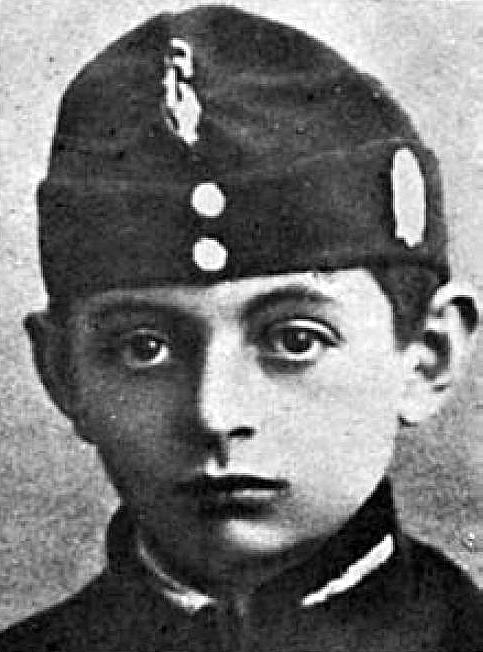
- Born: 16 December 1904; Dubliany, Kingdom of Galicia and Lodomeria, Austria-Hungary
- Died: 14 January 1919 (aged 14); Lviv, Second Polish Republic
- Burial place: Cemetery of the Defenders of Lwów
- Military career
- Allegiance: Poland
- Branch: Polish Armed Forces
- Service years: 1918–1919
- Rank: Private
- Unit: 38th Lviv Rifle Infantry Regiment
- Conflicts: Polish–Ukrainian War; Battle of Lviv †
- Awards: Virtuti Militari; Cross of Valour; Cross of Independence; Cross of the Defence of Lwów

Antoni Petrykiewicz (Note: In literature, he is sometimes referred to in the diminutive form ‘Antoś Petrykiewicz’.) (1904–1919) was a Polish secondary school student, soldier in the 8th Company of the 1st Lwów Rifle Regiment, Lwów Eaglet, participant in the Defence of Lwów in 1918 and the youngest recipient of the Order of Virtuti Militari in history.

== Biography ==
Antoni Petrykiewicz was born on 16 December 1904 in Dubliany. He was the youngest child in his family and he was baptised on 3 September 1905. He lived with his family in Zniesienie, Lviv. His parents were Kasper Petrykiewicz (owner of a small estate and mayor of Zasanie) and Rozalia, née Gruszecka. He had three sisters and four brothers: Zygmunt (who fought in the defence of Lviv in 1918, died in 1933 after an operation, buried in the Cemetery of the Defenders of Lwów ), Józef (1898–1990, defender of Lviv, social activist, councillor of Lviv until 1939, post-war émigré activist), Romana (participant in the defence of Lviv in 1918, died on 17 January 1986 in Warsaw at the age of 85), Tadeusz (defender of Lviv in 1918, died on 12 December 1985 in Bytom).

In 1918, Antoni Petrykiewicz was a second-year student at the C. K. V Gymnasium in Lviv. From early November 1918 Petrykiewicz took part in the Defence of Lviv during the Polish-Ukrainian War as a private in the 8th Company of the 1st Lviv Rifle Regiment. During the fighting for the Gafota shoe factory and in defence of the municipal slaughterhouse, he showed enormous courage. As a soldier in the Straceńcy (The Doomed) unit commanded by Lieutenant Roman Abraham, he took an active part in the fighting for Góra Stracenia (Execution Hill). Antoni fought his last battle on the outskirts of Lviv in the fighting for Persenkówka, during which he was seriously wounded on 28 December 1918. He passed away in the hospital at the Lviv Polytechnic University on 14 January 1919, (Note: The following dates are also given as dates of death: 15 and 16 January 1919, but the obituary published in the newspaper „Słowo Polskie” nr 15 from 16 January gives the date of 14 January) two days later he was buried in the Lychakiv Cemetery. The coffin with his body was carried by his four older brothers, followed by his mother and father.

General Roman Abraham wrote in a newspaper about Antoni Petrykiewicz:

In my unit, Góry Stracenia, the late Antoni Petrykiewicz, a 13-year-old second-year secondary school student, fought from the first days of November. Seriously wounded in the battle of Persenkówka on 28 December 1918, he died of his injuries in the hospital at the University of Technology.

After his exhumation in 1932, his remains were buried in crypt IV of the catacombs at the Cemetery of the Defenders of Lwów.

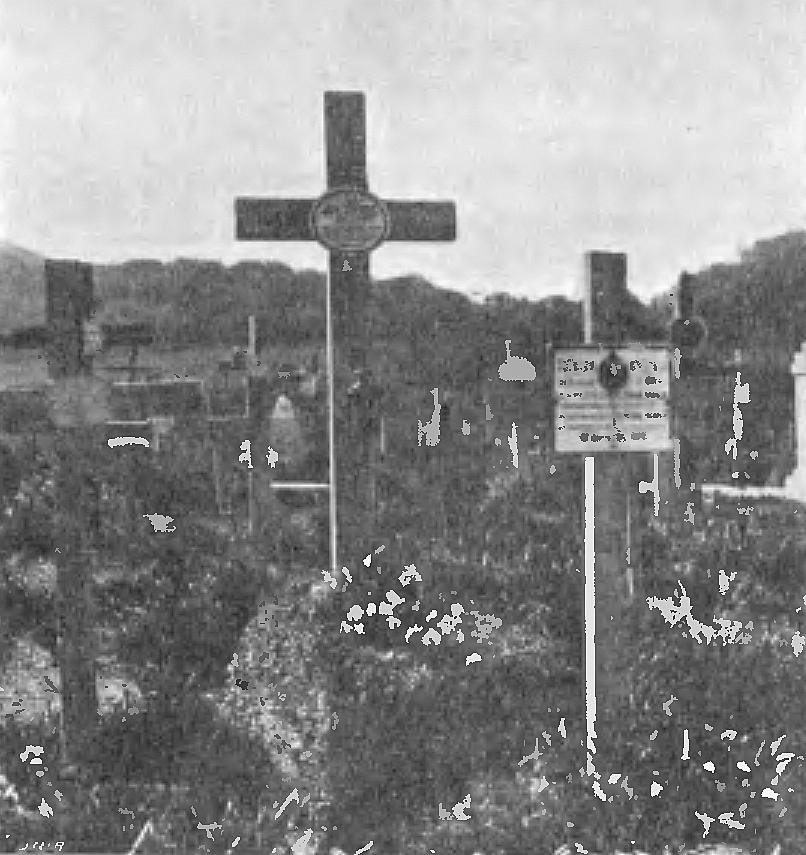
The graves of Czesław Antoni Bielecki and Antoni Petrykiewicz (before 1926)

== Legacy ==
By decree of Chief of State Józef Piłsudski dated 10 August 1922 (L. 13937/V/M) was posthumously awarded the Silver Cross of the Virtuti Militari nr 2986 and went down in history as the youngest recipient of this order (listed among the decorated soldiers of the later 38th Lviv Rifle Regiment). The VM decoration was awarded on 17 April 1921 in Lviv by General Tadeusz Rozwadowski. He was also awarded the Cross of Valour.

By order of the President of the Republic of Poland, Ignacy Mościcki, on 4 November 1933, he was posthumously awarded the Cross of Independence for: his work in regaining independence.

He was also posthumously honoured with the Cross of the Defence of Lwów.

His image appears on page 18 of Polish passports issued since 5 November 2018.

Petrykiewicz was mentioned on a plaque placed on the Monument to the Defenders of Lviv in Persenkivka.

== Awards ==
- Silver Cross of Virtuti Militari
- Cross of Independence
- Cross of Valour
- Cross of the Defence of Lwów
