= Orły =

Orły may refer to:

- Orły, Masovian Voivodeship, a village in east-central Poland
- Orły, Subcarpathian Voivodeship, a village in south-east Poland
- Gmina Orły, rural gmina (administrative district) in Subcarpathian Voivodeship, south-east Poland
- Orły-Cesin, village in Sochaczew County, Masovian Voivodeship, in east-central Poland
- Orły ("Eagles"), the common name of the Polish Film Awards

== See also ==
- Orłów (disambiguation)
