= Tadeusz Motowidło =

Polish politician

Member of Sejm
- In office 19 October 2001 – 7 November 2011

Personal details
- Born: 21 July 1952 (age 73)
- Party: Democratic Left Alliance

Tadeusz Motowidło (born 21 July 1952 in Trójczyce) is a Polish politician. He was elected to Sejm on 25 September 2005, getting 13,488 votes in 30 Rybnik district as a candidate from Democratic Left Alliance list.

He was also a member of Sejm 2001-2005.

== See also ==
- Members of Polish Sejm 2005-2007
