= Łętownia =

Łętownia may refer to the following places:

- Łętownia, Leżajsk County in Subcarpathian Voivodeship (south-east Poland)
- Łętownia, Przemyśl County in Subcarpathian Voivodeship (south-east Poland)
- Łętownia, Strzyżów County in Subcarpathian Voivodeship (south-east Poland)
- Łętownia, Lesser Poland Voivodeship (south Poland)
