= Orlow =

Orlow may refer to:

- Orlow language, a nearly extinct Australian Aboriginal language
- Orlow W. Chapman (1832–1890), American politician and lawyer
- Orlow Seunke (born 1952), Dutch director and screenwriter

== See also ==
- Orłów (disambiguation)
