= Mączyński =

Mączyński is a Polish surname. Notable people with the surname include:

- Czesław Mączyński (1881–1935), Polish officer and politician;
- Franciszek Mączyński (1874–1947), Polish architect;
- Jan Mączyński (c. 1520–c. 1587), Polish humanist and lexicographer;
- Krzysztof Mączyński (born 1987), Polish footballer.
