= Jan Tomasz Drohojowski =

Jan Tomasz Drohojowski from Drohojów (b. 1535, d.. 12 November 1605 in Przemyśl) was a Polish nobleman, referendarz wielki koronny, starosta of Przemyśl, a Polish ambassador in Istanbul in 1578, an owner of the castle in Rybotycze.

== Bibliography ==
- Polski Słownik Biograficzny (t. 5, s. 382)
