= Rożubowice =

- Village
- Interactive map of Rożubowice
- Location within Poland
- Coordinates: 49°44′N 22°51′E
- Country: Poland
- Voivodeship: Subcarpathian
- County: Przemyśl
- Gmina: Przemyśl

Rożubowice [rɔʐubɔˈvit͡sɛ] is a village in the administrative district of Gmina Przemyśl, within Przemyśl County, Subcarpathian Voivodeship, in south-eastern Poland, close to the border with Ukraine.
