= Gmina Przemyśl =

Gmina Przemyśl Przemyśl Commune
- Gmina
- Interactive map of Gmina Przemyśl
- Coordinates (Przemyśl): 49°47′N 22°46′E
- Country: Poland
- Voivodeship: Subcarpathian
- County: Przemyśl County
- Seat: Przemyśl

Area
  - Total: 108.39 km^{2} (41.85 sq mi)

Population (2013)
  - Total: 10,176
  - Density: 93.883/km^{2} (243.16/sq mi)
- Website: http://www.gminaprzemysl.home.pl/

Gmina Przemyśl is a rural gmina (administrative district) in Przemyśl County, Subcarpathian Voivodeship, in south-eastern Poland, on the border with Ukraine. Its seat is the town of Przemyśl, although the town is not part of the territory of the gmina.

The gmina covers an area of 108.39 square kilometres (41.8 sq mi), and as of 2006 its total population is 9,008 (10,176 in 2013).

The gmina contains part of the protected area called Pogórze Przemyskie Landscape Park.

== Villages ==
Gmina Przemyśl contains the villages and settlements of Bełwin, Hermanowice, Kuńkowce, Łętownia, Malhowice, Nehrybka, Ostrów, Pikulice, Rożubowice, Stanisławczyk and Witoszyńce.

== Neighbouring gminas ==
Gmina Przemyśl is bordered by the city of Przemyśl and by the gminas of Fredropol, Krasiczyn, Krzywcza, Medyka and Żurawica. It also borders Ukraine.
