= Stanisławczyk =

- Village
- Interactive map of Stanisławczyk
- Location within Poland
- Coordinates: 49°44′N 22°51′E
- Country: Poland
- Voivodeship: Subcarpathian
- County: Przemyśl
- Gmina: Przemyśl

Population
  - Total: 160
- Time zone: UTC+1 (CET)
  - Summer (DST): UTC+2 (CEST)

Stanisławczyk [staniˈswaft͡ʂɨk] is a village in the administrative district of Gmina Przemyśl, within Przemyśl County, Subcarpathian Voivodeship, in south-eastern Poland, close to the border with Ukraine.

Five Polish citizens were murdered by Nazi Germany in the village during World War II.
