= Malhowice =

- Village
- Interactive map of Malhowice
- Location within Poland
- Coordinates: 49°42′09″N 22°49′32″E
- Country: Poland
- Voivodeship: Subcarpathian
- County: Przemyśl
- Gmina: Przemyśl
- Population (2020): 193
- Postal Code: 37-733
- Car plates: RPR
- SIMC: 0608782

Malhowice [malxɔˈvit͡sɛ] is a village in the administrative district of Gmina Przemyśl, within Przemyśl County, Podkarpackie Voivodeship, in south-eastern Poland, close to the border with Ukraine.
