= Duńkowiczki =

- Village
- Location within Poland
- Coordinates: 49°52′N 22°47′E
- Country: Poland
- Voivodeship: Subcarpathian
- County: Przemyśl
- Gmina: Orły

Duńkowiczki [duɲkɔˈvit͡ʂki] is a village in the administrative district of Gmina Orły, within Przemyśl County, Subcarpathian Voivodeship, in south-eastern Poland.
