= Wacławice =

- Village
- Location within Poland
- Coordinates: 49°53′N 22°44′E
- Country: Poland
- Voivodeship: Subcarpathian
- County: Przemyśl
- Gmina: Orły
- Elevation: 200 m (660 ft)
- Population: 430

Wacławice [vat͡swaˈvit͡sɛ] is a village in the administrative district of Gmina Orły, within Przemyśl County, Subcarpathian Voivodeship, in south-eastern Poland.

== Climate ==
The climate is characterized as a temperate continental climate. Summers are mild to warm, with temperatures in August reaching around 25 °C, accompanied by light rainfall spread over several days. Winters are cold, with frequent frosty days and snowfall. Spring and autumn feature variable weather and moderate temperatures, along with moderate rainfall.
