= Małkowice, Podkarpackie Voivodeship =

Małkowice
- Village
- Location within Poland
- Coordinates: 49°51′N 22°49′E
- Country: Poland
- Voivodeship: Subcarpathian
- County: Przemyśl
- Gmina: Orły

Małkowice [mau̯kɔˈvit͡sɛ] is a village in the administrative district of Gmina Orły, within Przemyśl County, Subcarpathian Voivodeship, in south-eastern Poland.
