= Kosina =

- Village
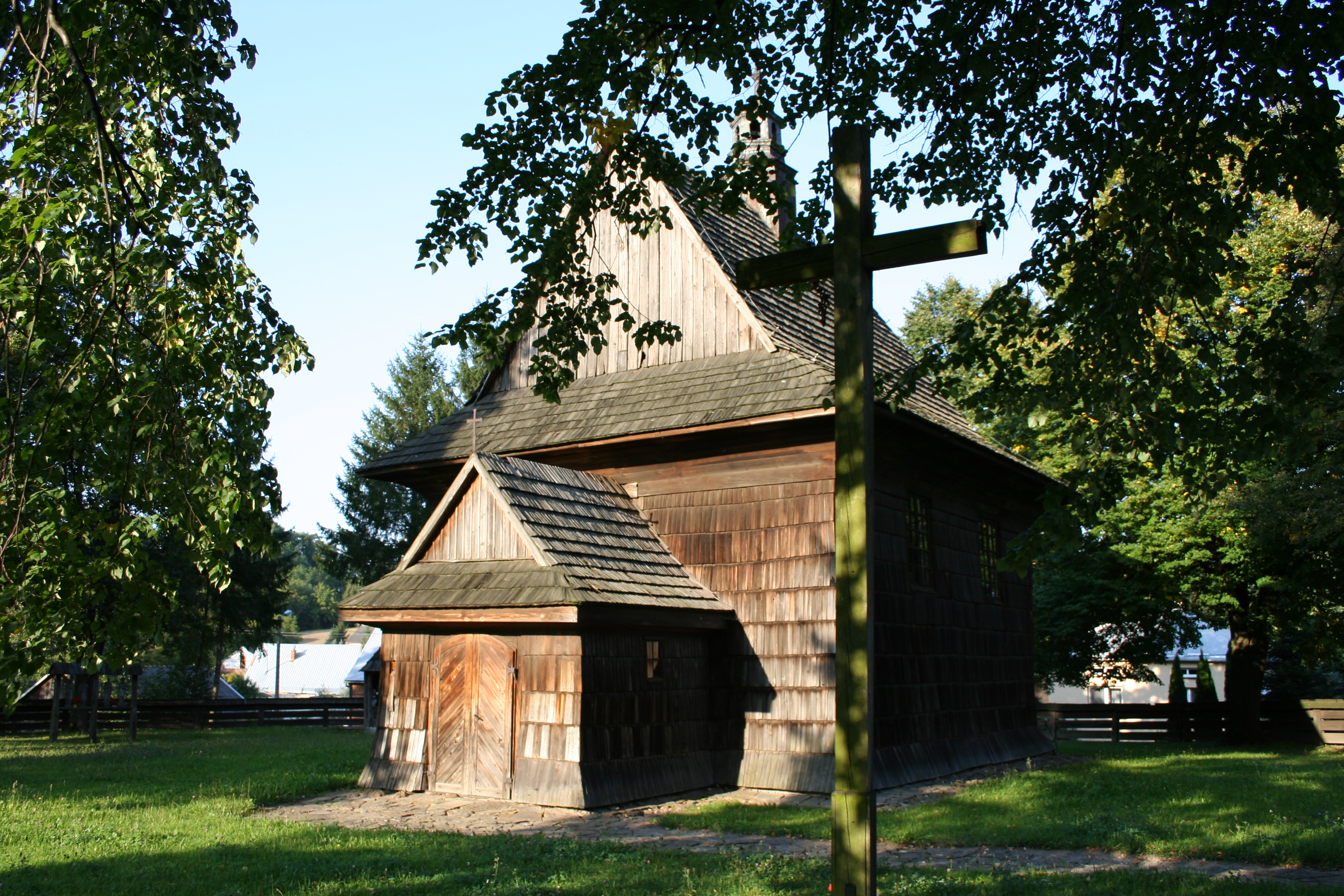
- Church of Saint Sebastian

- Location within Poland
- Coordinates: 50°4′N 22°19′E
- Country: Poland
- Voivodeship: Subcarpathian
- County: Łańcut
- Gmina: Łańcut

Population
  - Total: 3,500

Kosina [kɔˈɕina] is a village in the administrative district of Gmina Łańcut, within Łańcut County, Subcarpathian Voivodeship, in south-eastern Poland.

== Notable people ==
- Leopold Lis-Kula, Polish Army officer
