= Czesław Mączyński =

Polish army commander and politician

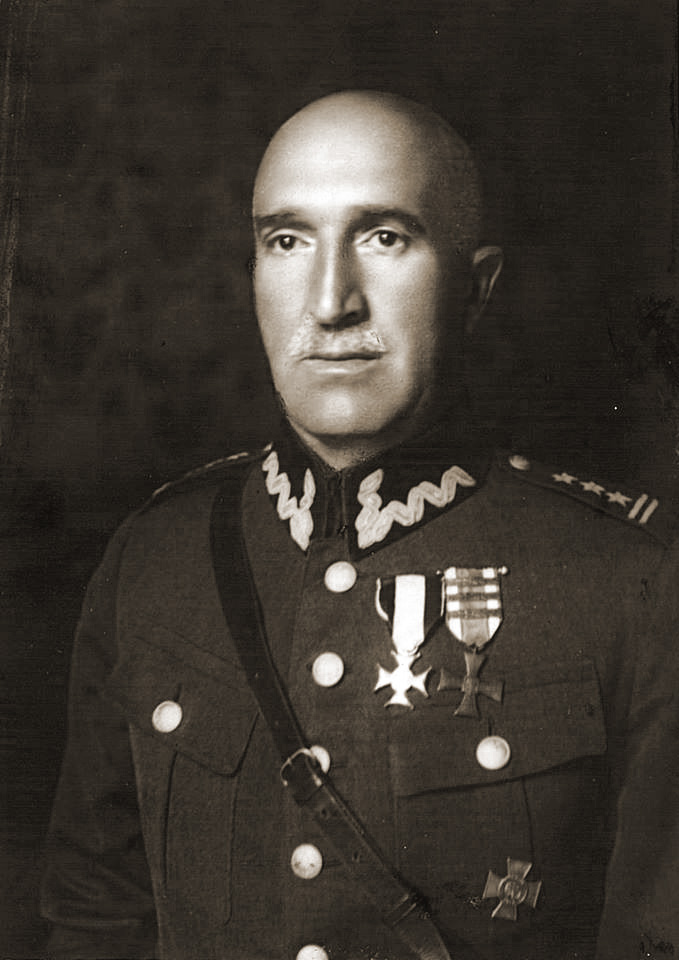
- Czesław Mączyński in uniform, 1920s
- Born: 9 July 1881; Kaszyce, Galicia, Austria-Hungary
- Died: 15 July 1935 (aged 54); Lwów, Second Polish Republic
- Military career
- Allegiance: Austria-Hungary; Second Polish Republic
- Branch: Common Army of the Austro-Hungarian Land Forces; Polish Land Forces
- Service years: 1914–1922
- Rank: Colonel (Polish: Pułkownik)
- Conflicts: World War I; Polish–Ukrainian War; Battle of Lemberg; Polish–Soviet War
- Awards: Cross of Independence with Swords, 1st Class; Silver Cross of the Order of Virtuti Militari, 5th Class; Officer's Cross of the Order of Polonia Restituta, 4th Class; Cross of Valour (four times)

Col. Czesław Mączyński (9 July 1881 in Kaszyce – 15 July 1935 in Lwów) was a Polish officer, politician in the Second Polish Republic, and the Commander-in-chief of the Polish military contingent during the defense of Lwów – also called the Battle of Lemberg – throughout November 1918 (part of the Polish–Ukrainian War), as well as the Polish–Soviet War of 1920. He was the recipient of some of the highest Polish military awards including Virtuti Militari, and a subject of the 2004 monograph by Jacek Miliński from University of Łódź.

== Career ==
Mączyński graduated from high-school in Jarosław and studied at the University of Lemberg (now Lviv University, Ukraine). He worked as teacher of the Polish, Latin and Greek languages at the Gymnasium No.1 in Przemyśl under partitions. When the First World War erupted, he was drafted by the Austrians. He served in the Austro-Hungarian Army, reaching a rank of captain. Around 1918 he joined the nascent Polish Army fighting for independence, and in the Polish-Ukrainian War served in the battle of Lemberg (1918), where he organized the defense of the city, and was de facto in command. Later, he fought in the Polish-Soviet War, and reached the rank of colonel in the Polish Army.

=== Commander of Lwów ===
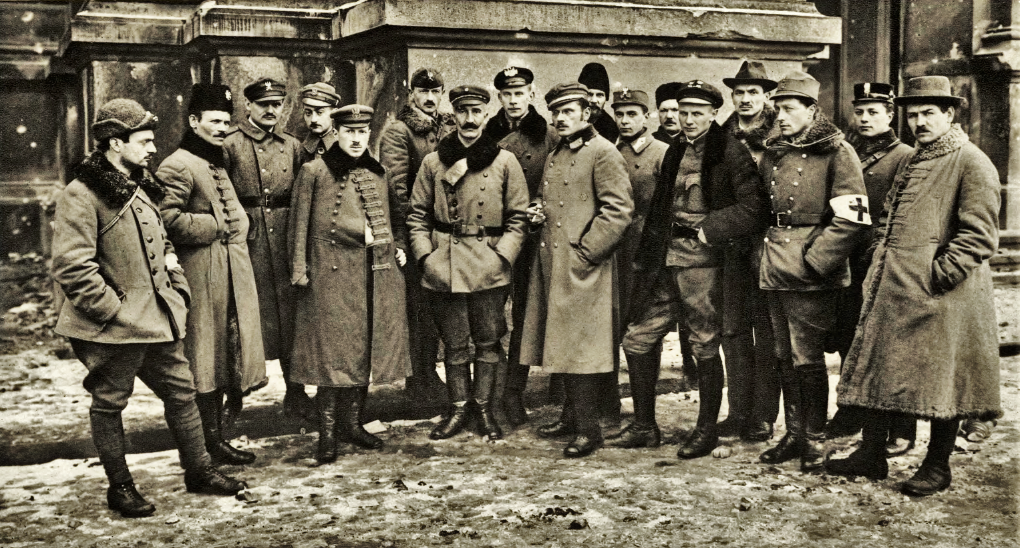
Polish Supreme Command of the 1918 defense of Lwów with Mączyński in the centre

Mączyński, along with ppłk Michał Karaszewicz-Tokarzewski won the battle for Lwów, which lasted for three weeks, and has taken the lives of 439 Polish and 250 Ukrainian soldiers. They took over the city on the night of 21/22 November 1918. On the morning of 22 November Mączyński issued a proclamation to all inhabitants of Lwów regardless of creed or religion assuring that they have nothing to fear and their rights will be respected by the new Polish administration providing they don't take up arms. However, at about 9am that same morning a pogrom erupted in the Jewish Quarter. Within hours Mączyński was visited by the President of the Jewish Religious Community Emil Parnas with Emil Wasser requesting protection; also addressed by them, were Ernest Adam from Polski Komitet Obywatelski and President Władysław Stesłowicz. General Roja issued an order convening of courts martial in deserving cases, but Mączyński did not receive it until two days later, which was blamed on the office-shop mishap.

On Saturday, 23 November, Brigadier General Bolesław Roja nominated Mączyński as the Commander of Lwów and its County, and transferred his military duties to Karaszewicz-Tokarzewski. Meanwhile, the pogrom continued throughout Saturday. Wiktor Chajes, Emil Parnas and Emil Wasser pleaded also with Roja and received his promise of protection. The assailants set on fire a few Jewish houses on the north side of Krakowski Square and the nearby streets. The Zipper's jewelry store in the square was ransacked, along with Gabriel Starck at Akademicki Square, Stauber's on Mariacki Square and the Jewish stores along ul. Karola Ludwika including the Abbazia café and the New York café, not to mention the actual Jewish Quarter where stores were robbed as a matter of course. Roja declared martial law. Soldiers were prohibited from leaving the barracks. Patrols were sent out and ordered to disarm any soldier without a unit. Roja confiscated an appeal to the Jewish community written by Mączyński,^{[a]} because he mentioned in it instances of Jewish attacks on Polish servicemen reported to him, including shooting from concealment and throwing of axes. The riots were extinguished by General Roja on 24 November 1918.

According to historian Carole Fink, Mączyński delayed the implementation of a 22 November order for martial law from Brigadier General Bolesław Roja for a day and a half. In the interim, Mączyński issued inflammatory proclamations, using what has been described as "medieval terminology," of supposed acts of Jewish treachery against Polish troops. He claimed, for example, that Jews had attacked Poles with axes. The Jewish quarter was cordoned off for 48 hours by fire officials, and buildings in the quarter, including 3 synagogues, were allowed to burn. The killing and burning in the quarter had already been done by the time Mączyński allowed patrols to enter the area.

The report written by Colonel Czesław Mączyński afterwards attempted to summarize the terrible human losses from his perspective as Commander of Lwów.

The Jewish Rescue Committee gives the following numbers in their summary: 73 killed, 443 wounded, 3,620 families victimized. The fact that the numbers are not adequate, can be shown in research conducted by the city comandanture. After the examination of records kept by the Jewish hospital and the Jewish public register, overall, between 1 November and 20 December 1918 sudden death was met by 68 Jews. From that number, in the period of Ukrainian attack – I stress, under the Ukrainian control of the city – from 1 to 22 November 27 Jewish people died. In the days of 22 – 25 November, 27 individuals died by the bullet. On 26 November died 8 persons from wounds received in previous days, and in the period from 26 November until 20 December 6 persons. I attest, that in all instances mentioned above the cause of death were bullet wounds. There were no piercing wounds on record at all, which would have been more typical of a pogrom and therefore probably most frequent. — Commanding officer, Czesław Mączyński

Żydowski Komitet ratunkowy w zestawieniu swoim podaje cyfry następujące: 73 zabitych, 443 rannych, 3620 rodzin poszkodowanych. Jak szalenie przesadzone te cyfry, świadczą poszukiwania, zarządzone przez komendę miasta. Otóż po dokładnym zbadaniu ksiąg i zapisków szpitala żydowskiego i żyd. urzędu metrykalnego, zmarło śmiercią gwałtowną w czasie od 1 listopada do 20 grudnia 1918 ogółem 68 żydów. Z cyfry tej przypada na czas inwazji ukraińskiej — i podkreślam pod panowaniem ukraińskim —t.j. od 1 do 22 listopada 27 osób. W dniach 22 — 25 list. padło od kul 27 osób. W dniu 26 listopada zmarło 8 osób, zapewne z ran otrzymanych w dniach poprzednich, a od 26 listopada do 20 grudnia 6 osób. Stwierdzić należy, że we wszystkich powyższych przypadkach przyczyną śmierci były rany postrzałowe. Nie było zupełnie ran kłutych, któreby chyba przy pogromie być musiały, ba nawet większość ran stanowić. — Za zgodność: Czesław Mączyński m. p.

=== Official investigation ===
Soon after the pogrom, a special state commission arrived from Warsaw in order to investigate, including Leon Chrzanowski and Józef Wasserzug. Their initial assessment was not entirely researched and suggested over 150 victims. Death count was later adjusted to include 73 persons killed of whom the youngest was only 11 years old, and the oldest, 80. There were 372 Jews seriously wounded, and over 50 homes burned including the Old Synagogue at Bożnicza Street and the Hasidic Synagogue at the corner of pl. św. Teodora and ul. Węglana. At least 3,729 homes, stores and workshops were robbed. Subsequently, some 1,600 persons were arrested, suspected of participating in the pogrom. The majority of them were released soon thereafter. In mid February 1919 charges were laid against 79 suspects, including 46 women and 8 army soldiers. Convicted of crime were 44 individuals, sentenced from 10 days to 18 months in prison. Three participants were sentenced to death for capital offences, and executed. According to internal investigation by the Jewish Rescue Committee (Żydowski Komitet Ratunkowy) held alongside the official state investigation, most rapes, robberies and murders were committed by unidentified soldiers.

=== Postwar career ===
After the war, Mączyński settled near Brzeżany and became a social activist. In 1922 he was elected as Deputy to the first Polish parliament (Sejm) as member of the right-wing Christian Union of National Unity coalition from Lwów. He returned to the Army in 1927 at the age of 46 but retired two years later in 1929, and in 1933 was awarded the Cross of Independence with Swords for his service during the Polish–Soviet War. He also published his memoirs and analysis of the battle of Lwów, titled Boje Lwowskie, with description of the anti-Jewish "Lwów pogrom". Mączyński remained single. Known to local nationalists, he was a target of notable arsons. He died of an illness at the age of 54. His place in the Polish history of Lviv was reasserted only after the collapse of the Soviet Union.

== Honours and awards ==
- Silver Cross of the Order of Virtuti Militari
- Cross of Independence with Swords
- Officer's Cross of the Order of Polonia Restituta
- Cross of Valour - four times

== See also ==
- Lwów pogrom (1918)

== Notes ==
a. Original text in Polish of an Appeal to the Jews of Lemberg signed by Mączyński, and confiscated by General Roja right thereafter. The Appeal spoke of the reported to him (not properly investigated) individual cases of alleged Jewish attacks (which were later disproved as false in official state investigation) and ascribed responsibility for these acts upon the Jewish community.

W ciągu trzech tygodni walki o Lwów znaczny odłam ludności żydowskiej nie tylko nie zachował neutralności w stosunku do wojska polskiego, ale niejednokrotnie z bronią w ręku stawiał opór, a także w zdradziecki sposób starał się zatrzymać zwycięski pochód naszych wojsk. Zostały ustalone wypadki strzelania z zasadzki do naszych żołnierzy, zlewania ich wrzącym ukropem, rzucania na patrole siekierami itp. Komenda wojska polskiego wstrzymuje naturalny odruch ludności polskiej i wojska. Wszyscy obywatele bez różnicy wyznania zostali wzięci pod ochronę prawa. Zostało w tym względzie wydane rozporządzenie o sądach i karach doraźnych. Niemniej na ogóle ludności żydowskiej ciąży poważny obowiązek powściągnięcia części swoich współwyznawców, która w dalszym ciągu nie przestaje działać tak, jakby chciała ściągnąć nieobliczalną katastrofę na ogół ludności żydowskiej. Komenda wojsk polskich liczy, że ludność żydowska m. Lwowa przede wszystkim we własnym interesie wstrzyma swoich współwyznawców od objawów nienawiści do rządów polskich i że poprawnym, lojalnym zachowaniem się umożliwi władzom i reszcie ludności wprowadzenie i utrzymanie ładu, opartego na prawie.

In the three weeks of the battle for Lwów a considerable faction among Jewish citizens not only remained non neutral towards the Polish army, but on occasion also attempted to resist with arms in their hands, secretly trying to prevent the victorious advance of our military. There were instances reported of shooting from deep concealment, throwing pots of boiling water but also axes at the army patrols, etc. The Command of Polish Army defers the immediate impulses of civilian Poles and any soldiers. All citizens regardless of faith are protected by law. In that regard, a decree was issued of courts martial and appropriate punishment. Nevertheless, there's a serious responsibility on the part of the entire Jewish community to stop these elements among their own coreligionists who act in a way that suggests a complete lack of care for the impending catastrophe which could affect all Jewish citizens. The command of the Polish Army counts on the Jewish people of Lwów, chiefly in their own interest, to prevent their own peers from expressing hate toward the Polish rule and, by proper and loyal behaviour, allow the authorities and the rest of our citizenry to introduce and maintain law and order.
