= Nehrybka =

- Village
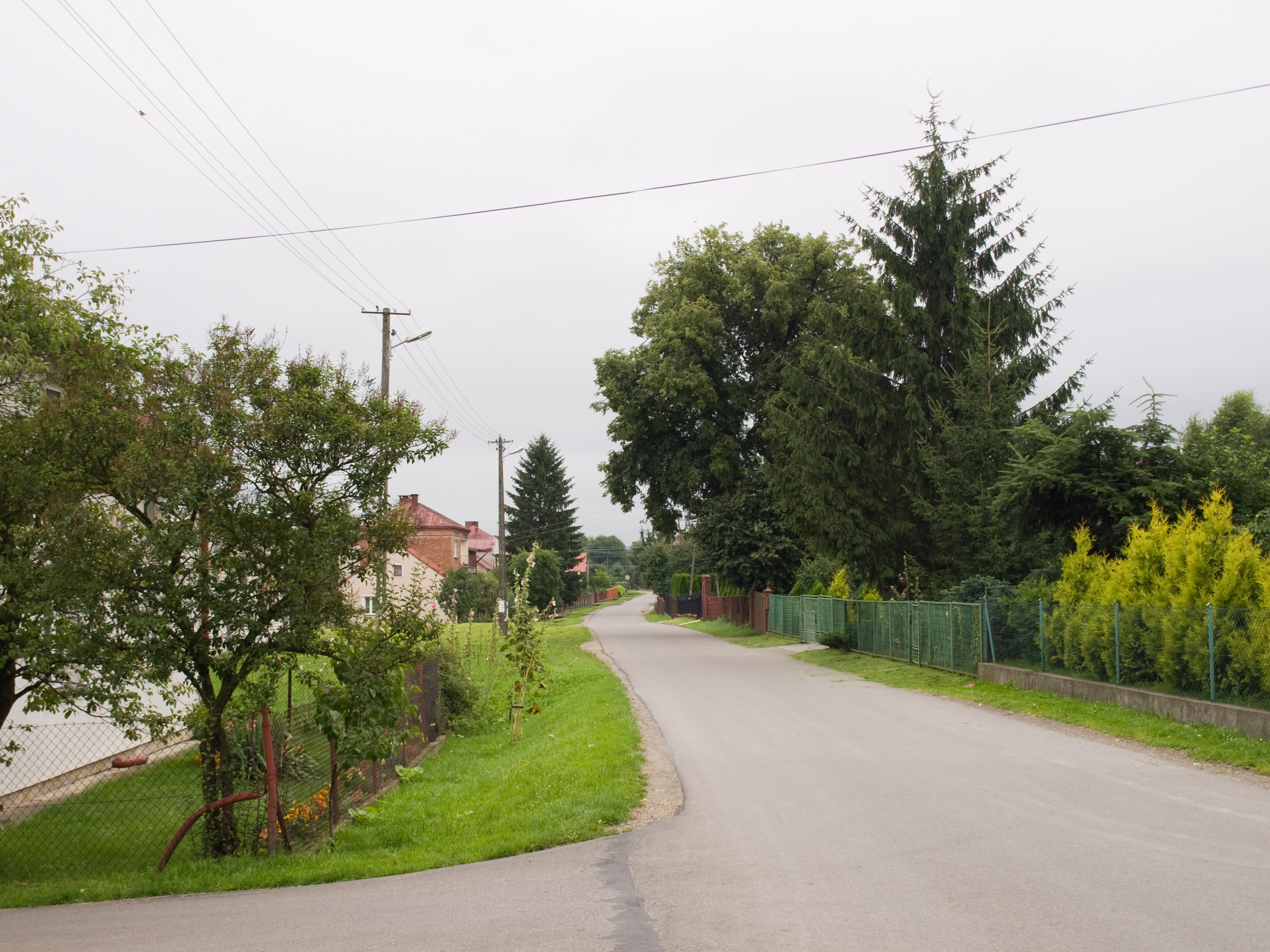
- Interactive map of Nehrybka
- Location within Poland
- Coordinates: 49°45′05″N 22°48′07″E
- Country: Poland
- Voivodeship: Subcarpathian
- County: Przemyśl
- Gmina: Przemyśl

Population
  - Total: 1,000
- Time zone: UTC+1 (CET)
  - Summer (DST): UTC+2 (CEST)
- Vehicle registration: RPR

Nehrybka [nɛˈxrɨpka] is a village in the administrative district of Gmina Przemyśl, within Przemyśl County, Subcarpathian Voivodeship, in south-eastern Poland, close to the border with Ukraine.

== History ==
Nehrybka was located on major trade routes stretching from the north and south of Przemyśl. This geographical situation was advantageous for the village's growth. The lands of the village are crossed by rivers, by the Malinowski and Jawor streams, and to the east, the Wiar River. The flat terrain was beneficial for the development of agriculture. Since ancient times, the nearby river has provided residents with water, and also energy to run a mill. In addition, the Wiar River has served as a natural moat, which helped the inhabitants of Nehrybka defend against attacks from the east. Dozens of archaeological sites are scattered throughout the village's territory, including those of prehistoric settlements.

=== Middle Ages ===
The name of Nehrybka first appeared in 1363. That date is linked to a certain James, an Orthodox priest. The next mention of the village dates to 1389, in which King Władysław II Jagiełło granted the rights of Magdeburg law and one hundred Frankish fiefs to Przemyśl, starting from the borders of "Nehrzebka." The Rus origins of the village were confirmed by a stone pole inscribed in old Ruthenian, with an image of the Crucifixion, which stood before World War I, just seven minutes from the main road. The former location of the pole is likely to be near the present-day monument to the murdered Soviet and Italian prisoners of war from the Second World War. During the times when the Przemyśl area was part of Kyivan Rus, Nehrybka and other nearby villages were known for their horse husbandry. The residents of this area from the Middle Ages had occupied themselves only in caring for the princely stables.

=== Polish–Lithuanian Commonwealth ===
Under the Polish–Lithuanian Commonwealth, Nehrybka was part of the Przemyśl County in the Rus Voivodeship in the Lesser Poland Province. In 1651, the village was partly owned by the king, and partly belonged to the Przemyśl chapter of the Latin rite. There is a record that there was a mill in Nehrybka in 1658. In 1674, a part of the village belonged to the royal property, and the second part to Pawel Nehrebecki.

The bishops of Przemyśl, while under the Polish-Lithuanian Commonwealth and, later, under the Austrian Empire, resided not in the city but 20 km (12 mi) away in Walawa on the San River. They would come to Przemyśl for the celebration of important Masses. At those times they would be accompanied by an episcopal Cossack regiment under the leadership of an elected Ataman. The Ataman would be selected from among the ranks of the Cossacks and would be confirmed by the bishop. The last episcopal Cossack Ataman was named Khrobak. The Cossacks lived in the nearby village of Nehrybka. Some of the Cossacks resided permanently in the episcopal palace in Walawa. The Austrian Emperor Joseph II banned this institution, and also forbade them and the village gentry from carrying swords. Up until that time, the village gentry would often wear swords, even when plowing the fields amongst their serfs.

=== Austrian Empire ===
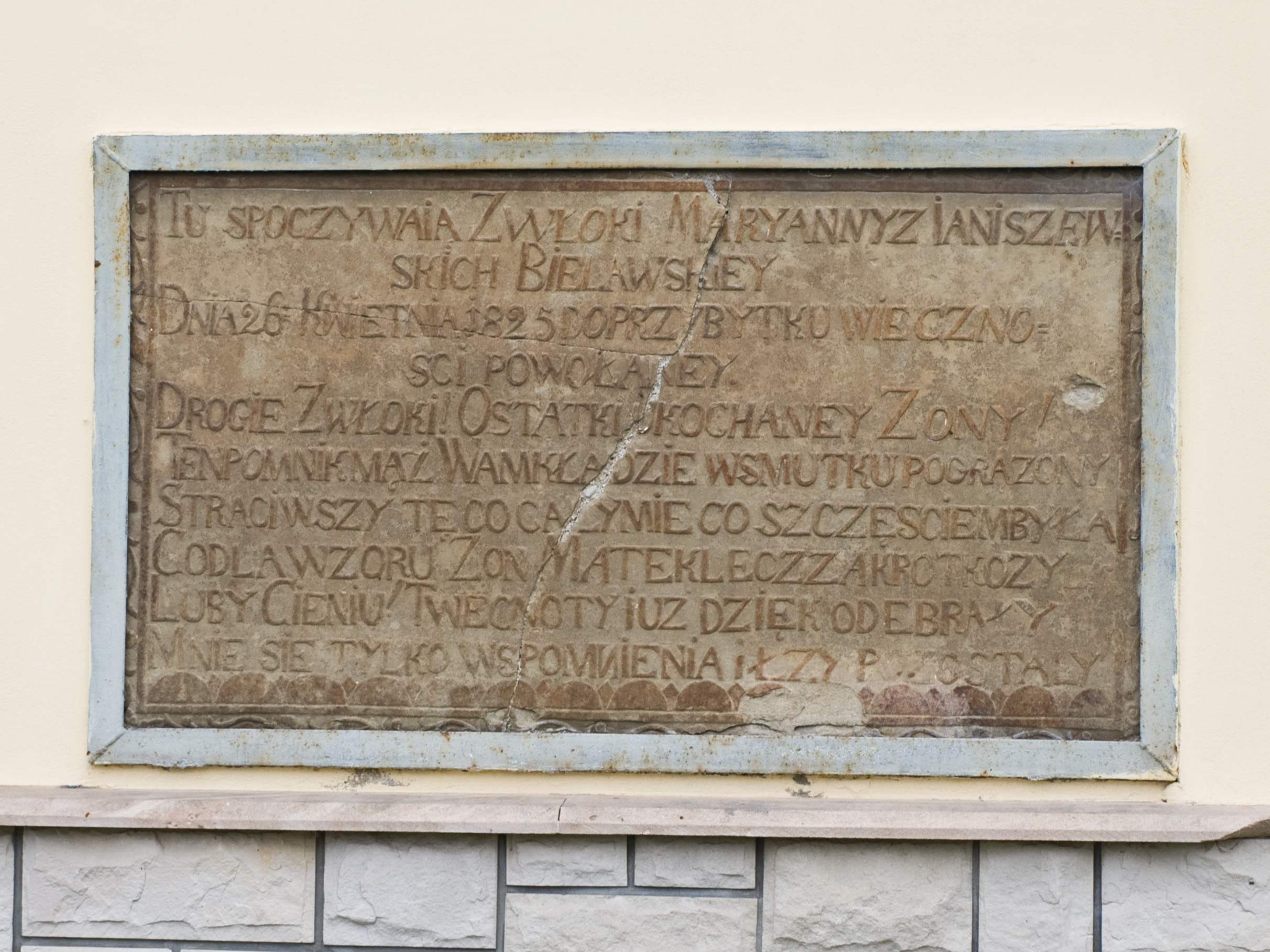
Early-19th-century epitaph at a local church

In 1772, Nehrybka, at the time of the First Partition of Poland, became part of the Austrian monarchy. After a brief time, the authorities of the monarchy auctioned the village to Count Ignacy Cetner. Under Austrian rule, Nehrybka lay in the province of Lwów. It was subject to the district command of the state police in Przemyśl. During construction of the fortifications for Przemyśl, there was erected in Nehrybka an artillery battery "Nehrybka", which was to protect the city between the first and second rings of defense. For this reason, residents were not allowed to build houses near the fort.

In 1868, the village belonged administratively to the district of Przemyśl, its Roman Catholic parish was in Przemyśl, while the Greek Catholic parish was in the village. Its land area was 985 acres (399 ha). Most of them were arable and belonged to large landowners, such as Prince Konstantin Czartoryski or Karel Bielawski. The Greek Catholic parish included the churches of Pikulice and Sielec. The village had Roman Catholic and Greek Catholic church buildings, and a primary school. The masonry Greek Catholic church of St. Stephen Protomartyr was built in 1885. It was severely damaged in World War I, but was rebuilt in 1926. The masonry church replaced an earlier wooden church that had existed at least as early as 1828. With the expulsion of Ukrainians in the 1940s, the filial churches in Pikulice and Sielec no longer exist. Today the church functions as a Roman Catholic parish.

In 1909, the village was owned by Prince Hieronim Lubomirski, and in 1914 Nehrybka belonged to Princess Karolina Lubomirska.

=== World Wars ===
World War I was fought in 1914–1918. The lands near Nehrybka were especially besieged by the attacking Russian army. With the defeat of the Central Powers, namely Germany and Austria-Hungary, Nehrybka was to join the re-emerging Polish state. This was a difficult period in the village's history. The Ukrainian Greek Catholic majority living in and around Nehrybka was aware that they were a separate nation and wanted to have their own state. The problem is that for hundreds of years the lands, on which the Ukrainians wanted to create it, had belonged to the Poles. Shortly before the end of World War I, demobilized soldiers of both nations in Galicia, armed themselves and began to fight for the independence of their respective nations. From this time come the legendary Polish Eagles of Przemyśl. Eventually, Nehrybka found itself a part of the Second Polish Republic.

On September 1, 1939, Poland was attacked by the Germans and on September 17 by the Soviet Union. The border between Germany and the Soviet Union proceeded along the San River, dividing Przemyśl into two, and leaving Nehrybka under Soviet occupation. This state of affairs lasted until 1941. On June 22, at the German–Soviet border, German troops attacked the Soviet Union, and within days, Nehrybka passed under German occupation. The Germans operated a subcamp of the Stalag 327 prisoner-of-war camp in the village, with mass graves of Italian POWs unearthed in 1961. The Soviet and Italian prisoners of war met a terrible fate. They were kept under inhumane conditions. Witnesses claim that the camp did not even have grass, because it was eaten by the prisoners. In one of the present factory buildings Polna S.A., prisoners of war were shot and then thrown into a mass grave at the Battery 2 "Nehrybka. To this day, in this place, stands a monument commemorating the tragedy of those people. On July 27, 1944, Nehbryka was liberated from German occupation. In the liberated territories, in a few years, began to rule the Soviet-installed puppet "people's government," which under Stalin was particularly onerous for residents.

=== Post-World War II ===
After World War II, Poland reappeared on the map of Europe, but its borders were shifted significantly to the west and north. Within these limits, Germans who had owned lands for hundreds of years were expelled. Poles who had been expelled from areas inside the Soviet Union took their place. Already in 1945, the Ukrainians of Nehrybka were being resettled. In their place came Poles expelled from within the borders of the USSR, who came mainly from Radochoniec and Miżyńca, as well as from Siberia. This changed the ethnic composition of the village, and by 1947 the last group of Ukrainians was deported.

== Population ==
In the second half of the eighteenth century (1785), Nehrybka had a multi-ethnic character. Its population numbered 532, including 432 Greek Catholics (80%), 80 Roman Catholics (15%), and 29 Jews (5%).

The village's population did not grow significantly into the next century. According to the census of 1858, there lived in Nehrybka 567 people. In 1880, the population of Nehrybka was 610, of whom 141 belonged to the manorial estate (15 of whom were of the Roman Catholic rite).

In 1921, there resided in Nehrybka 677 inhabitants in 115 homes (about 6 persons per home): 561 Greek Catholics (83%), 89 Roman Catholics (13%), and 27 Jews (4%).

At the outbreak of World War II, the population had changed and grown considerably. In 1939, Nehrybka was inhabited by some 700 Poles, 650 Ukrainians, and 100 Jews.
