= Łętownia, Przemyśl County =

Łętownia
- Village
- Location within Poland
- Coordinates: 49°48′40″N 22°42′2″E
- Country: Poland
- Voivodeship: Subcarpathian
- County: Przemyśl
- Gmina: Przemyśl

Łętownia [wɛnˈtɔvɲa] is a village in the administrative district of Gmina Przemyśl, within Przemyśl County, Subcarpathian Voivodeship, in south-eastern Poland, close to the border with Ukraine.
