= Orłów =

Orłów may refer to the following places:

- Orłów, Lesser Poland Voivodeship (south Poland)
- Orłów, Łódź Voivodeship (central Poland)
- Orłów, Subcarpathian Voivodeship (south-east Poland)
- Orłów, Sochaczew County in Masovian Voivodeship (east-central Poland)
- Orłów, Szydłowiec County in Masovian Voivodeship (east-central Poland)

== See also ==
- Orły
