= Hermanowice =

- Village
- Location within Poland
- Coordinates: 49°44′N 22°49′E
- Country: Poland
- Voivodeship: Subcarpathian
- County: Przemyśl
- Gmina: Przemyśl

Hermanowice [xɛrmanɔˈvit͡sɛ] is a village in the administrative district of Gmina Przemyśl, within Przemyśl County, Subcarpathian Voivodeship, in south-eastern Poland, close to the border with Ukraine.
