= Kaszyce =

- Village
- Location within Poland
- Coordinates: 49°54′15″N 22°44′22″E
- Country: Poland
- Voivodeship: Subcarpathian
- County: Przemyśl
- Gmina: Orły
- Population: 1,100

Kaszyce [kaˈʂɨt͡sɛ] is a village in the administrative district of Gmina Orły, within Przemyśl County, Subcarpathian Voivodeship, in south-eastern Poland.
