= Gmina Orły =

Gmina Orły Orły Commune
- Gmina
- Interactive map of Gmina Orły
- Coordinates (Orły): 49°52′N 22°48′E
- Country: Poland
- Voivodeship: Subcarpathian
- County: Przemyśl County
- Seat: Orły

Area
  - Total: 70.11 km^{2} (27.07 sq mi)

Population (2013)
  - Total: 8,846
  - Density: 126.2/km^{2} (326.8/sq mi)

Gmina Orły is a rural gmina (administrative district) in Przemyśl County, Subcarpathian Voivodeship, in south-eastern Poland. Its seat is the village of Orły, which lies approximately 10 kilometres (6 mi) north of Przemyśl and 60 km (37 mi) east of the regional capital Rzeszów.

The gmina covers an area of 70.11 square kilometres (27.1 sq mi), and as of 2006 its total population is 8,351 (8,846 in 2013).

== Villages ==
Gmina Orły contains the villages and settlements of Ciemięrzowice, Drohojów, Duńkowiczki, Hnatkowice, Kaszyce, Małkowice, Orły, Trójczyce, Wacławice, Walawa and Zadąbrowie.

== Neighbouring gminas ==
Gmina Orły is bordered by the gminas of Chłopice, Radymno, Stubno and Żurawica.
