= Orły, Podkarpackie Voivodeship =

Orły
- Village
- Location within Poland
- Coordinates: 49°52′N 22°48′E
- Country: Poland
- Voivodeship: Subcarpathian
- County: Przemyśl
- Gmina: Orły
- Population: 1,000

Orły [ˈɔrwɨ] is a village in Przemyśl County, Subcarpathian Voivodeship, in south-eastern Poland. It is the seat of the gmina (administrative district) called Gmina Orły.
