= Coat of arms of Lviv =

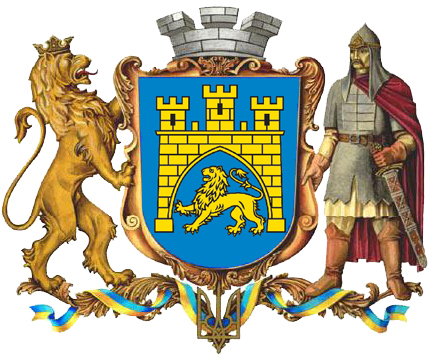

Versions
- Armiger: Lviv
- Adopted: 5 July 1990
- Shield: Azure, beneath a castle gate a lion passant, all Or.

The coat of arms of the city of Lviv features a golden lion beneath a city gate in a blue field. The current version of the symbol was adopted by the city council in 1990. Based on the principles of the blazoning it either features a lion passant, beneath a castle gate, or, in an azure field.

== History ==
The lion was a traditional symbol of the city throughout the ages. The first such depictions occurred on 13th-century seals of dukes Andrew and Leo of Volhynia, rulers of medieval Ruthenian duchy of Halych-Volynia. The earliest known emblem of the city features a lion passant through a city gate pointed with three towers. It was featured on a city council seals, used by the magistrate in 1359 and later.

In 1526 Polish king Sigismund the Old of Poland formally accepted the coat of arms. To underline that the city belongs to the crown, a royal crown was added in the coronet. In later ages, although the colours and shapes of all the charges varied, their number remained the same. In 1586 bishop Jan Dymitr Solikowski, royal diplomat and a bishop of Lwów, as the city was then called, was accepted on an audience by the Pope Sixtus V. In the effect, the city was granted with a privilege of adding the papal coat of arms to its own. Thus the shape of the lion was modified. The lion passant was replaced with a lion rampant, with the papal emblem (three helmets and an 8-pointed star) in one of the legs. During the partitions of Poland, after the city got annexed by Austria, on November 6, 1789, the coat of arms was again confirmed by the highest authorities - this time by Emperor Joseph II of Austria.

During the Galician period the city emblem remained unchanged. After the Polish-Bolshevik War of 1919-1920, the city became once again a part of Poland. After the Polish-Ukrainian War of 1918, the city was awarded with the Virtuti Militari medal, the highest Polish military decoration. Since 1936, the medal was also featured in the emblem's compartment. In addition, the city's motto semper fidelis was also featured.

After World War II the city was annexed by Soviet Union. On 15 July 1967, a new, simplified coat of arms was approved by the Soviet authorities. It featured a lion rampant Or, below a three-towered city gate proper, with a hammer and sickle in the centre Or, on azure.

After Ukraine declared independence, on 5 July 1990 the city council passed a new coat of arms, modelled after the initial emblem from the times of Ruthenia. The new coat of arms was designed by Andriy Grechylo, Ivan Svarnyk, Ivan and Volodymyr Turetskyi.

== Gallery ==
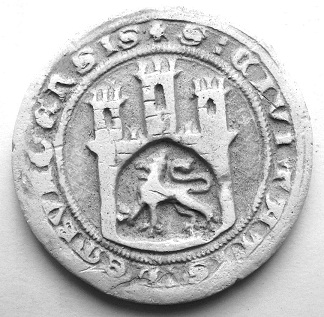
Seal of Lwów City (14th century, Kingdom of Poland)

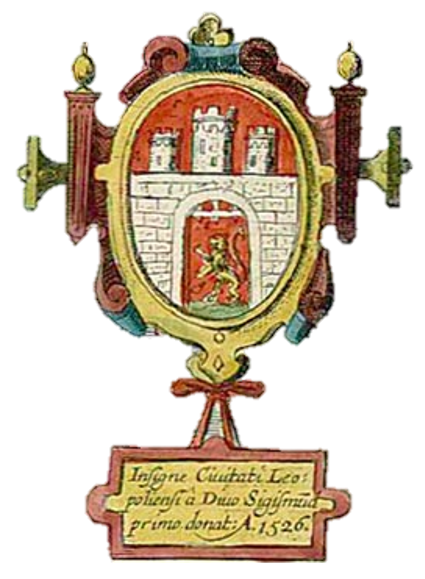
Coat of arms, from the View of Lwów, designed by Abraham Hogenberg (1618)

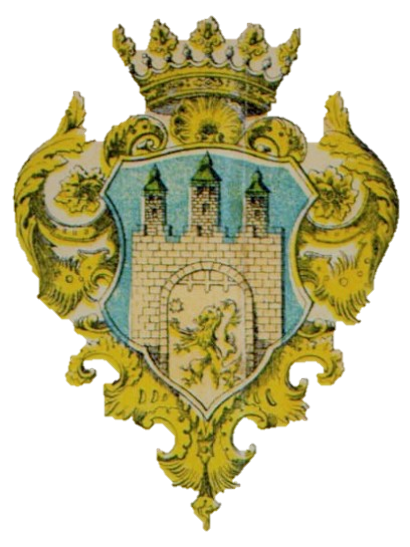
Historical coat of arms, used during the Austrian period (1789-1918)

Historical coat of arms, used during the Polish period (1936-1939)

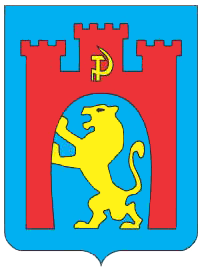
Historical coat of arms, used during the Soviet period (1967-1990)
