= Battle of Lemberg (1918) =

1918 battle between during the Polish-Ukrainian war

Coordinates: 49.8300°N 24.0142°E

Battle of Lemberg (Lviv, Lwów)
- Part of Polish–Ukrainian War
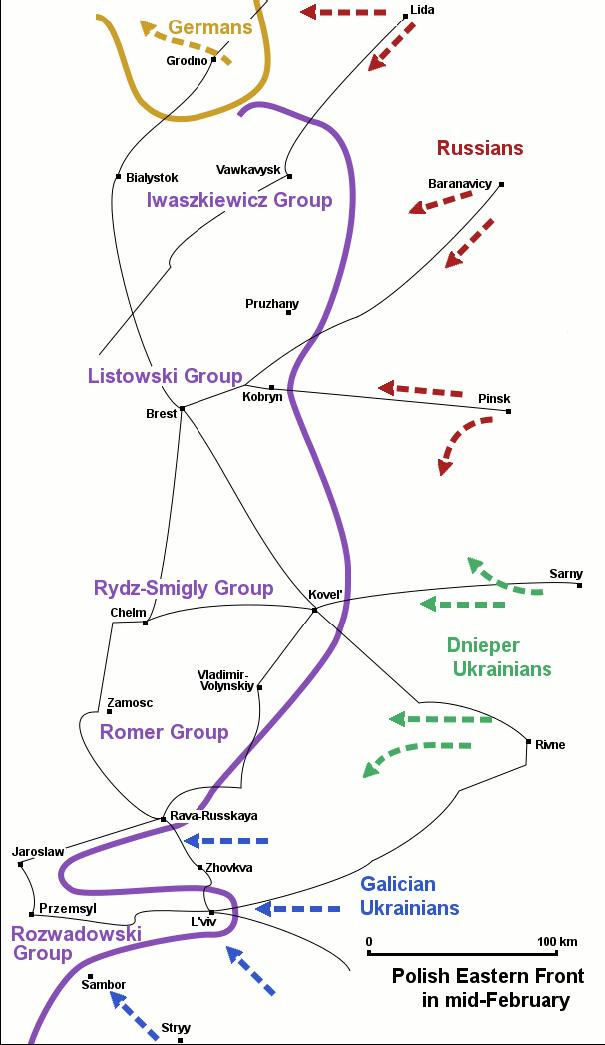
- Situation on the Polish-Ukrainian front (lower part of the map) in mid-February 1919, after the Ukrainian siege was broken
Date	1 November 1918 – 22 May 1919 (6 months and 21 days)
Location	Lemberg (Lviv, Lwów)
Result	Polish victory: Beginning of the Polish-Ukrainian War

Belligerents
(West Ukrainian People's Republic) West Ukraine	(Second Polish Republic) Poland

Commanders and leaders
Dmytro Vitovsky; Hryhoriy Kossak; Hnat Stefaniv	Czesław Mączyński

The Battle of Lemberg (Lwów, now Lviv), known in Polish historiography as the Defense of Lwów (obrona Lwowa), was fought between Polish forces and troops of the West Ukrainian People's Republic from November 1918 to May 1919 for control of the city in Eastern Galicia, following the collapse of Austria-Hungary. It marked the beginning of the Polish–Ukrainian War.

The fighting began on 1 November 1918, when Ukrainian troops seized key government buildings and military positions in Lwów and encountered armed resistance from Polish residents. Reinforced by regular units of the Polish Army, Polish forces secured the city on 22 November after the Ukrainian troops withdrew. Ukrainian forces continued military operations around Lwów until a Polish offensive brought the siege to an end on 22 May 1919.

== Background ==
The modern city of Lviv was called Lviv by the Ukrainians, Lwów by the Poles, and Lemberg by the Austrians and is the largest city in the historical region of eastern Galicia. According to the Austrian census of 1910, which listed religion and language, 52% of the city's population were Roman Catholics, 31% Jews, and 15% were Greek Catholics. Linguistically, 86% of the city's population used the Polish language and 11% preferred the Ukrainian language, so most of the inhabitants of Lemberg (Lwów, Lviv) were Poles. In eastern Galicia, Ukrainians made up approximately 58% of the population, while Poles made up 30%, and Jews about 11% of the population and were numerically superior in the cities. As a part of the Austrian partition of Poland, Lemberg became the center of Polish culture and scholarship, as well as Polish and Ukrainian political activity.

Due to the intervention of Archduke Wilhelm of Austria, a Habsburg who adopted a Ukrainian identity and who considered himself a Ukrainian patriot, in October 1918 two regiments consisting of mostly Ukrainian troops were brought into the city, so that most of the Austrian troops stationed in Lviv were ethnic Ukrainians. At the same time, most of Polish units in Austro-Hungarian service were sent to other fronts in order to avoid conflict between the two groups. In addition, the Ukrainian Sich Riflemen were stationed in Bukovina and were supposed to join the Ukrainian troops in the city. The Ukrainian National Rada (a council consisting of all Ukrainian representatives from both houses of the Austrian parliament and from the provincial diets in Galicia and Bukovina) had planned to declare the West Ukrainian People's Republic on November 3, 1918 but moved the date forward to November 1 due to reports that the Polish liquidation committee was to transfer from Kraków to Lviv.

== Ukrainian takeover ==
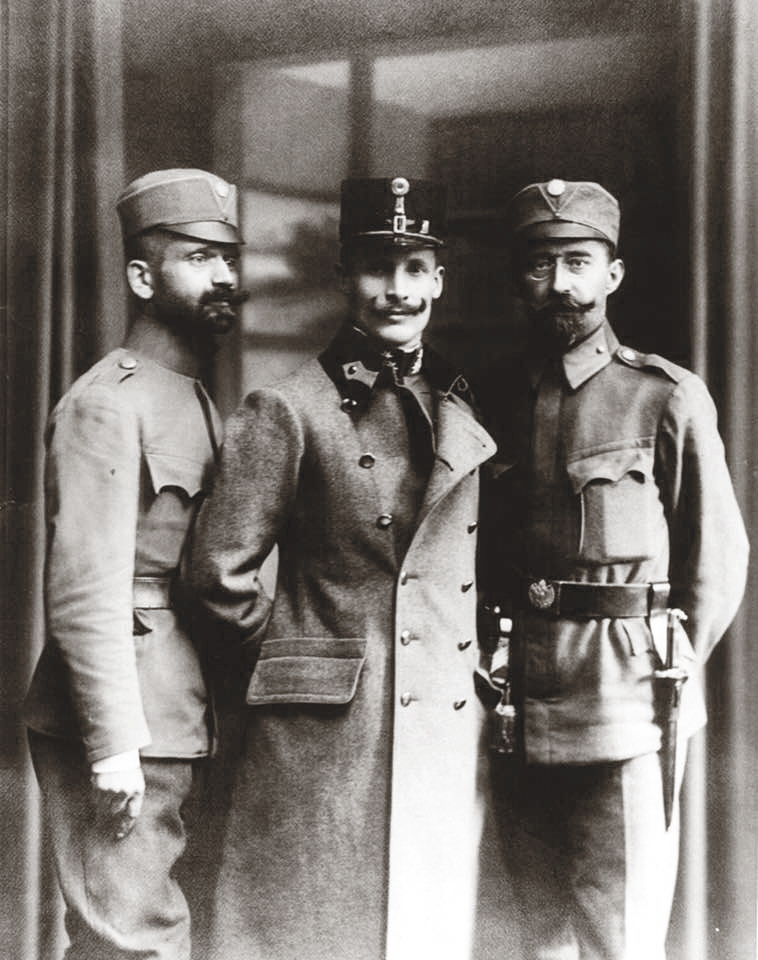
Dmytro Vitovsky (in the middle) accompanied by two officers, 1918

Between 3:30 and 4:00 A.M. on November 1, 1918 Ukrainian soldiers occupied Lviv's public utilities and military objectives, raised Ukrainian flags throughout the city and proclaimed the birth of the new Ukrainian state. The Austrian governor was interned and handed over power to the vice-director of the governorship, Volodymyr Detsykevych, who in turn recognized the supreme authority of the Ukrainian National Rada. The Austrian military commander called on his subordinates to recognize the Rada as well. Colonel Dmytro Vitovsky became commander-in-chief of the Ukrainian forces in Lviv, which numbered 60 officers and 1,200 soldiers. Lviv was proclaimed the capital of the West Ukrainian People's Republic, which claimed sovereignty over Eastern Galicia, the Carpathians up to the village of Komańcza in the west (Komancza Republic), Carpathian Ruthenia and northern Bukovina. However, a large part of the claimed territory, including the city of Lviv, was also considered Polish by many of the local residents. While the Ukrainian residents enthusiastically supported the proclamation and the city's significant Jewish minority remained mostly neutral towards the Ukrainian proclamation, the Polish residents, constituting the majority of Lviv's inhabitants, were shocked to find themselves in a proclaimed Ukrainian state.

== Polish resistance ==
The Polish forces, initially numbering only about 200 people under Zdzisław Tatar-Trześniowski, organized a small pocket of resistance in a school on the western outskirts of the city, where a group of veterans of the Polish Military Organization put up a fight armed with 64 outdated rifles. After the initial clashes, the defenders were joined by hundreds of volunteers, mostly Scouts, students and youngsters. More than 1000 people joined the Polish ranks on the first day of the war. This enabled the Poles to retake some of the western parts of the city, while most of the city centre remained in Ukrainian hands.

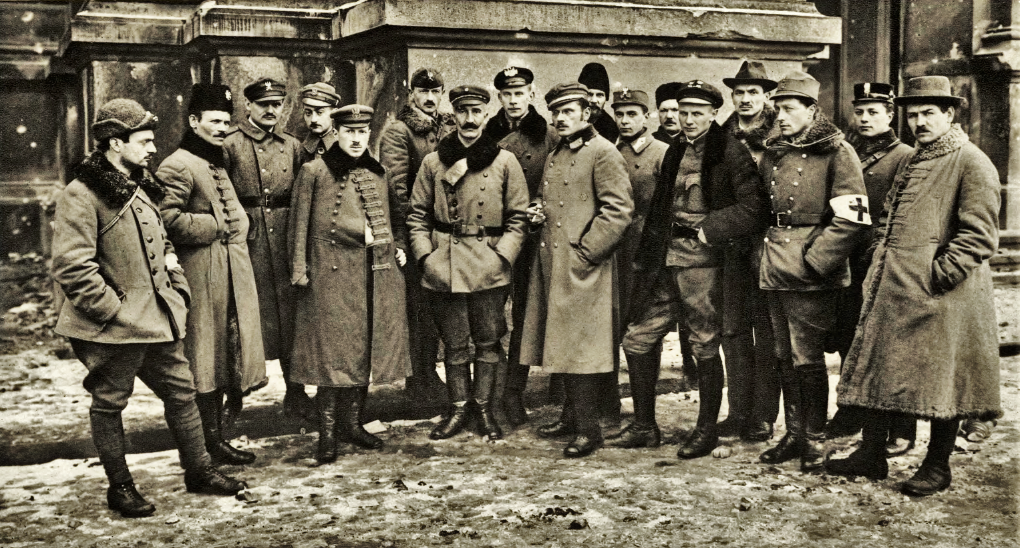
Polish Supreme Command defending Lwów, 1918

Although numerically superior, well-equipped and battle-hardened, Vitovsky's soldiers were mostly villagers and were unaccustomed to city fighting. Furthermore, the elite Ukrainian Sich Riflemen had difficulty breaking into the city from Bukovina due to the intense resistance of Poles in the suburb of Klepariv. Although their enemies were ill-equipped and mostly untrained, they had the advantage of good knowledge of the city, which proved vital in the early days of the defence. In the following day the forces of the defenders reached roughly 6,000 men and women, more than 1400 of them gymnasium students and youngsters. Because of their heroism and mass participation in the fights, they are commonly referred to as Lwów Eaglets. The Polish defenders also included a significant component of petty criminals, who, nevertheless, were valued for their heroism. On November 3 a few units of the Sich Riflemen broke through and entered the city, and command over the Ukrainian forces was transferred to Col. Hnat Stefaniv. However, a Polish assault on the Main Train Station succeeded and the Poles managed to capture two Ukrainian supply trains, largely negating the Ukrainian superiority in arms and munitions. By November 5 the Ukrainians were pushed out of the western part of the town, yet the Polish assault on the city centre was repulsed and both sides reached a stalemate. With insufficient personnel to man a regular front line, the front was stable only in the centre, while in other areas only the most important buildings were defended.

On November 11, 1918, Poland declared her independence and the following day the first units of the regular forces of the Polish Army under Maj. Wacław Stachiewicz entered Przemyśl, only some 70 kilometres away from Lviv. Believing this move to be part of the preparations to break through the Ukrainian siege, Col. Stefaniv prepared a general offensive on the Polish-held western parts of the city. However, despite the heavy fighting that raged between November 13 and November 15, the Polish defence held out and the Ukrainians were repelled. An armistice was signed on November 18.

== Ukrainian withdrawal ==
After two weeks of heavy fighting within the city, a Polish detachment consisting of 140 officers, 1,228 soldiers, and 8 artillery guns under the command of Lt. Colonel Michał Karaszewicz-Tokarzewski of the renascent Polish Army, broke through the Ukrainian siege and arrived at the city. On November 21 the siege was broken and the Ukrainians were repelled from the Lychakiv Cemetery, one of the most important areas of the city. The remaining Ukrainian forces withdrew during the following night, although they continued to surround Lviv from three sides.

== Lwów pogrom ==
Chaos during the Polish take-over of the city culminated in a two-day-long riot, in which mostly Polish criminals and soldiers started pillaging the city; over the course of the riots, approximately 340 civilians, 2/3 of them Ukrainians and the rest Jews, were murdered. The Jews were accused of cooperating with Ukrainians, and it was claimed that approximately 150 Jews were murdered and 500 Jewish shops and businesses were ransacked in reprisal, although the Morgenthau commission reported only 64 Jewish deaths.

Historian Andrzej Kapiszewski noted: "the anti-Semitism of the local populations led to many anti-Jewish outbreaks, especially in the Eastern territories, where the Jewish population was particularly large". After establishing order within the city, Polish authorities punished a number of people accused of participation in riots. Seventy-nine of them were tried by Polish military courts, with 44 of them being convicted. Although three of the pogromists were found guilty of murder and shot, most of the others received lenient sentences, ranging from 10 days to 18 months.

== Ukrainian siege and Polish victory ==
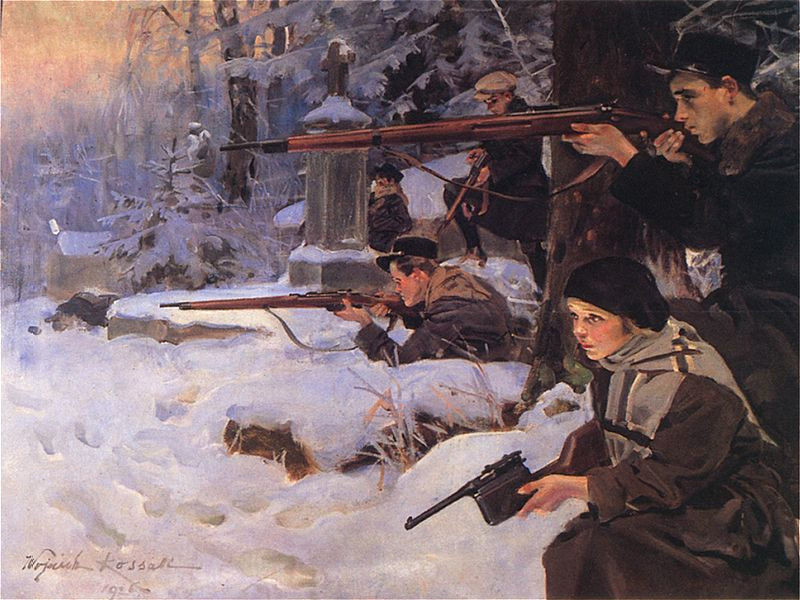
Fighting for the Lychakiv Cemetery on a painting by Wojciech Kossak

However, heavy fighting for other cities claimed by both Poles and Ukrainians continued, and the battle for Lviv lasted until May 1919. After their withdrawal in November, Ukrainian forces had laid siege to the city, surrounding it on three sides. The only link between Polish forces in the city and central Poland was the railway line from Przemyśl. Due to its crucial importance for defenders, constant fighting for control of this line was waged, at times including the usage of armored trains.

In Lviv itself, Ukrainians started an artillery bombardment of the city on December 22, preceding the first general offensive, which commenced on December 27. This assault, and the following one from February 1919, were unsuccessful, and Polish forces continued to hold the city. On February 24, 1919, a short-lived armistice was signed, based on the strong demand of the Entente's representatives, who arrived in February in a futile attempt to reconcile the belligerents and bring them to an agreement.

Fighting began again on March 1, 1919. Positional skirmishes between entrenched sides lasted until May 1919, when a general Polish offensive on the Eastern Galician front forced the Ukrainians, endangered with the risk of encirclement, to pull back from their positions around the city, thus ending the six-month-long battle for control over Lviv.

== Aftermath ==
The Polish-Ukrainian fight for Lviv is sometimes referred to as "the last civilized conflict" by Polish historians. Because both sides were too weak to create regular front lines and lacked heavy weapons, the civilian casualties were low and did not exceed 400. Also, both sides tried to avoid destroying the city's facilities and the most important buildings were declared de-militarized zones. Among them were the hospitals, the water works, gas plant and the energy plant. Local ceasefire agreements were signed on a daily basis and there were even numerous situations where both Polish and Ukrainian soldiers played football or partied during cease fires. In his memoirs, Polish Lieutenant (later Colonel) Bolesław Szwarcenberg-Czerny noted that during one of the ceasefires Lieutenant Levsky, the Ukrainian commander of an outpost fighting with his unit, got so drunk with the Poles that he overslept and woke up late after the latest ceasefire had ended. Immediately another ceasefire was signed to allow the Ukrainian officer to return to his unit.

Because of that, the losses on both sides were small. The Poles lost 439 men and women, 120 of them gymnasium pupils, such as Antoni Petrykiewicz and Jerzy Bitschan, and 76 Lviv University students. Most of them were interred in the Cemetery of the Defenders of Lwów.
