= Lwów Eaglets =

Polish child soldiers in the Polish-Ukrainian War

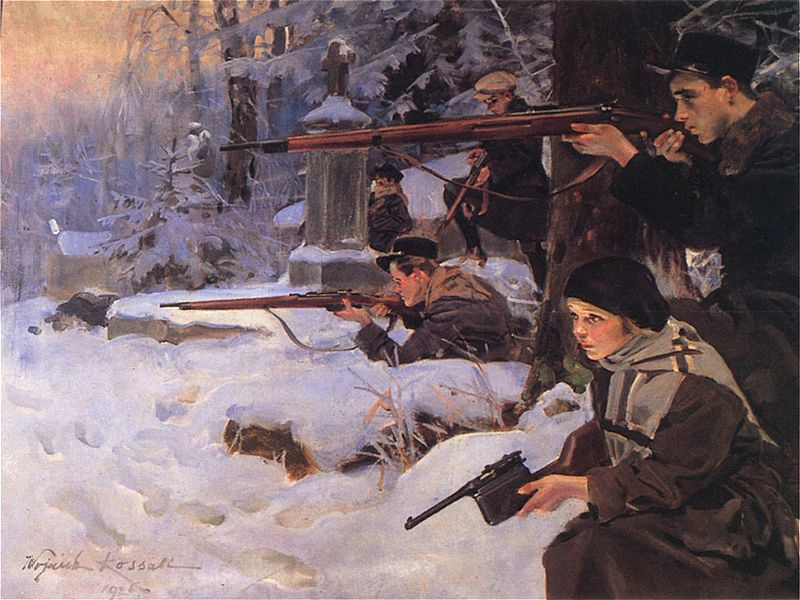
Lwów Eaglets; Defenders of the Cemetery, painting by Wojciech Kossak, 1926, oil on canvas, 90 x 120 cm, Polish Army Museum, Warsaw

Lwów Eaglets (Polish: Orlęta lwowskie) is a term of affection that is applied to the Polish child soldiers who fought for the city of Lwów (Ukrainian: L'viv), in Eastern Galicia, during the Polish-Ukrainian War (1918–1919).

== Background ==
The city now known in Ukrainian as Lviv (Polish: Lwów) was, before the Dissolution of Austria-Hungary, known as Lemberg and was the capital of Emperor Karl's Kingdom of Galicia and Lodomeria. Poles were a prevailing ethnic group in the Kingdom overall, but in eastern Galicia, Ukrainians were a majority (61%), with Poles a significant minority (27%) and dominating the cities along with Jews. In Lemberg, according to the Austrian census of 1910, 51% of the city's population were Roman Catholics, 28% Jews, and 19% Ukrainian Greek Catholics; 86% of the city's population spoke Polish and 11% Ukrainian.

In the final days of the Habsburg Monarchy, on 1 November 1918, Ukrainian soldiers from Austrian army units occupied Lemberg's public buildings and military depots, raised Ukrainian flags throughout the city and proclaimed the birth of a new Ukrainian state. While the Ukrainian minority enthusiastically supported the proclamation, the city's Jewish minority remained mostly neutral towards it and the city's Polish majority were shocked to find themselves under Ukrainian rule. Reacting to this military revolution, Poles rose up throughout the city. Polish high school students and scouts numbering only 200, organized a small pocket of resistance in a school at the western outskirts and managed to defeat battle-hardened Ukrainian veterans of the Great War with only 64 outdated rifles. After initial clashes, the defenders were joined by hundreds of volunteers, mostly boy scouts, students and youngsters. More than 1,000 people joined the Polish ranks in the first day of the fighting.

== Description ==
Among them were many young volunteers, who became known as the Lwów Eaglets. Initially, the term was confined to those who had participated in the fights within the city between 1 and 22 November 1918, and the following siege by the Ukrainian army between 23 November 1918 and 22 May 1919. With time, however, the term's application was broadened, and it is now used for all the young soldiers who fought in the area of Eastern Galicia for the Polish cause in the Polish-Ukrainian War and the Polish-Bolshevik War. In addition to the young Polish nationals of Lviv, those fighting in the Polish-Ukrainian battle for Przemyśl are also frequently referred to as Przemyskie Orlęta ('"Przemyśl Eaglets").

== Cemetery ==
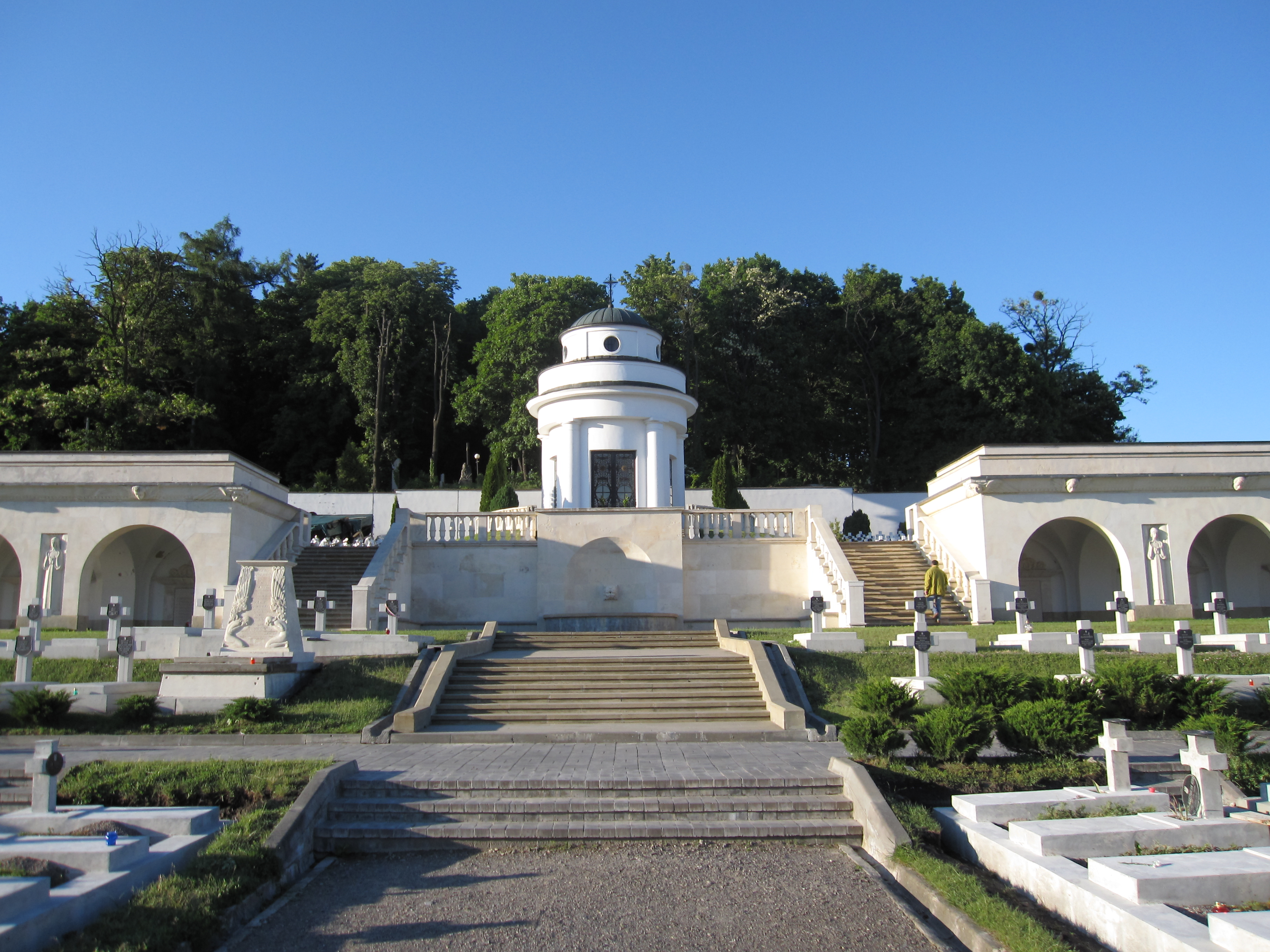
Cemetery of the Defenders of Lwów

After the Polish-Ukrainian conflict, the Lwów Eaglets were interred at the Cemetery of the Defenders of Lwów (Polish popular name: Cmentarz Orląt Lwowskich), part of the Lychakiv Cemetery. The Cemetery of the Defenders held the remains of both teenaged and adult soldiers, including foreign volunteers from France and the United States. The Cemetery of the Defenders of Lwów was designed by Rudolf Indruch, a student at the Lviv Institute of Architecture, himself an Eaglet. Among the most notable Eaglets to be buried there was the 14-year-old Jerzy Bitschan, the youngest of the city's defenders, whose name became an icon of the Polish interbellum.

Also resting in the Eaglet's pantheon is the six-year-old Oswald Anissimo who was executed, together with his father, Michał, by Ukrainian militiamen.

After the annexation of Eastern Galicia by the Soviet Union in World War II during the Soviet invasion of Poland and then the expulsion of ethnic Poles from the province, the graves were destroyed in 1971, and the Cemetery of the Defenders of Lwów was turned into a municipal waste dump and then a truck depot.

After the dissolution of the Soviet Union and the formation of an independent Ukraine, work began on the restoration of the cemetery despite obstruction from local nationalists. However, Polish support for the 2004 Ukrainian Orange Revolution greatly weakened local opposition, and the cemetery was officially reopened in a joint Polish-Ukrainian ceremony on 24 June 2005.

The last surviving Lwów Eaglet, Major Aleksander Sałacki (born 12 May 1904), died in Tychy, on 5 April 2008.

== See also ==
- Battle of Lwów (1918)
- Battle of Zadwórze
- Leopold Lis-Kula
- St Andrew Bobola Church, Hammersmith
