= Cemetery of the Defenders of Lwów =

War graves cemetery in Ukraine

Coordinates: 49°49′48″N 24°3′29″E

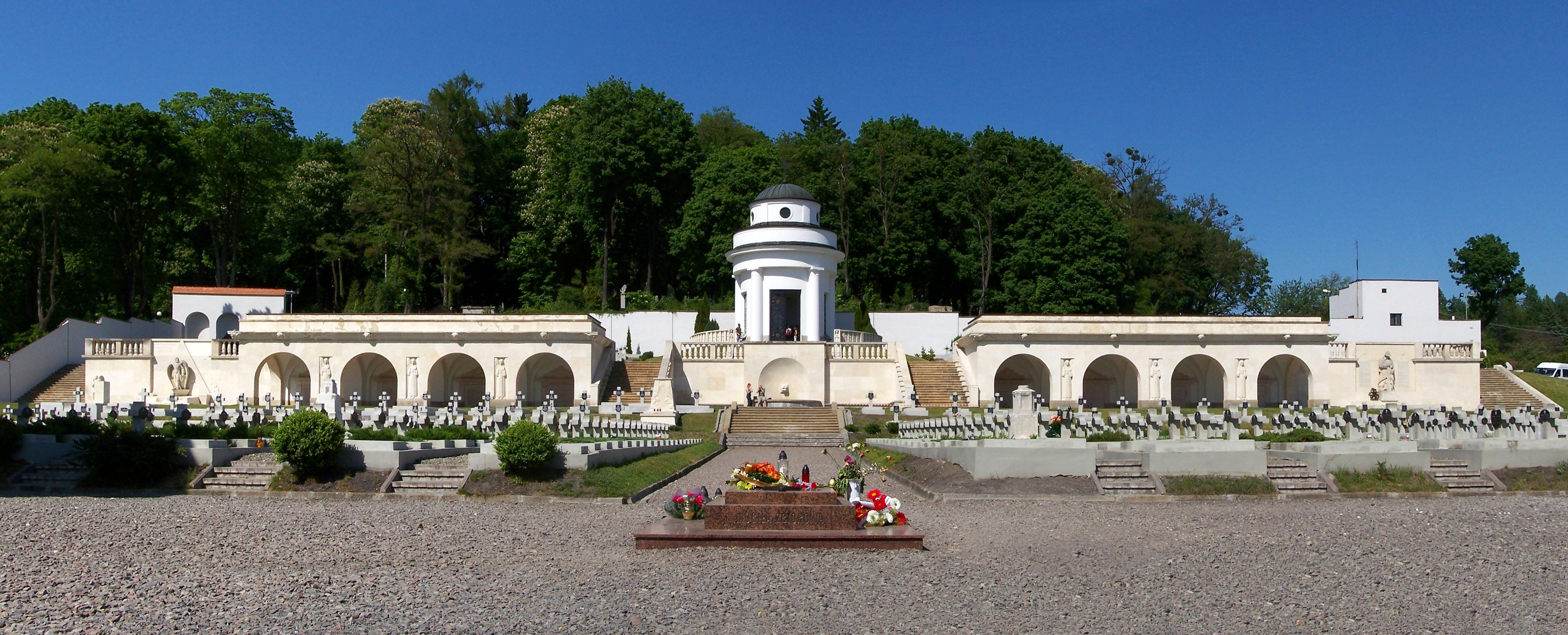
Cemetery of the Defenders of Lwów in 2007, after restoration.

The Cemetery of the Defenders of Lwów (Polish: Cmentarz Obrońców Lwowa, Cmentarz Orląt Lwowskich, Cemetery of the Lwów Eaglets, Orlat Cemetery) is a memorial and a burial place for the Poles and their allies who died in Lwów (Ukrainian: Lviv) during the hostilities of the Polish-Ukrainian War and Polish-Soviet War between 1918 and 1920.

The complex is a part of the city's historic Lychakiv Cemetery. There are about 3000 graves in that part of the cemetery; some from the Lwów Eaglets young militia volunteers, after whom that part of the cemetery is named. It was one of the most famous necropolises of the interwar Poland.

Initially neglected during Soviet times, much of the cemetery was destroyed in 1971. Following the Revolutions of 1989, the cemetery remained neglected until improvements in Polish-Ukrainian relations resulted in its rebuilding and refurbishment, leading to it becoming one of the principal tourist attractions of Lviv.

== In the Second Polish Republic ==
In 1918–1919, Poles and Ukrainians fought over the territory of Eastern Galicia that included Lviv; with Poland defeating the Western Ukrainian People's Republic. A year later, another war, between Poland and the Russian SFSR, was fought around the city. In the aftermath, the city ended up being part of interwar Poland, and the Polish authorities decided to construct a memorial to the Poles and their allies who died in the 1918–1920 hostilities in that region.

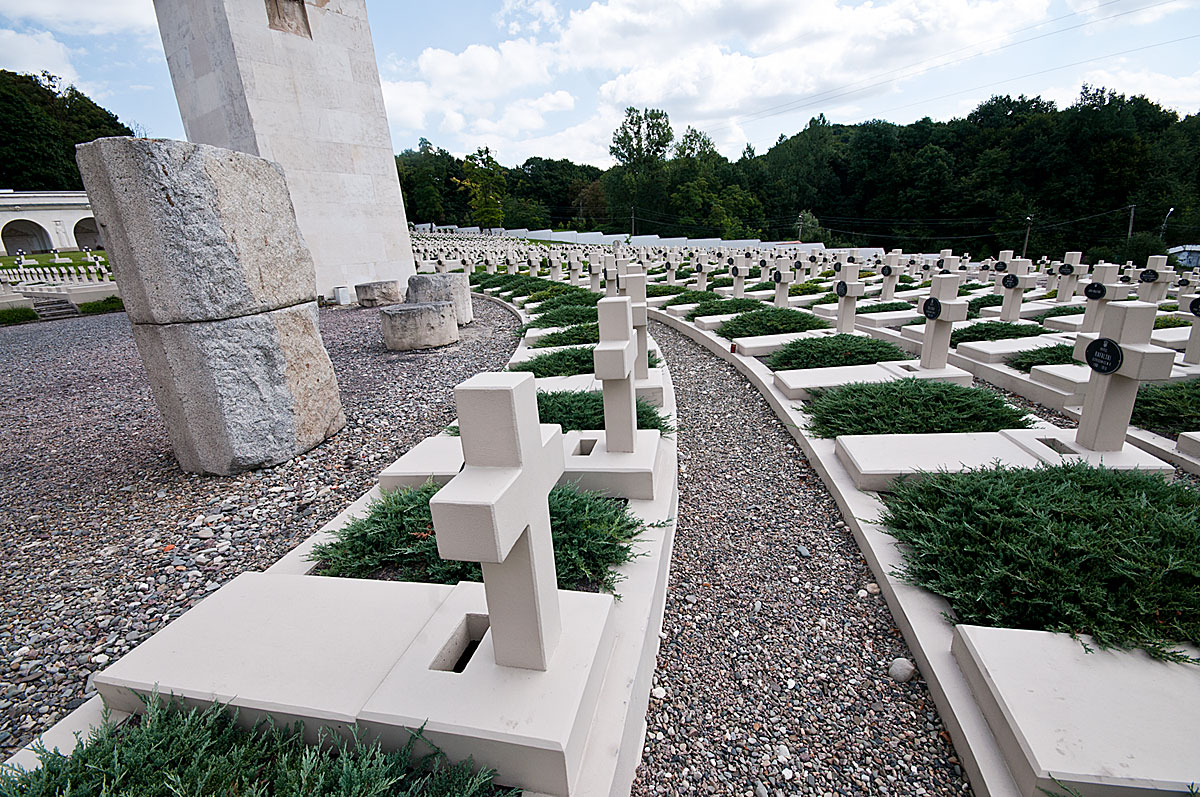
Cemetery of the Defenders of Lwów in 2011.

The necropolis complex was designed by Rudolf Indruch, an architecture student from the Lviv Polytechnic whose project won the competition. The most visible element was a domed chapel which towers over the tombs underneath. Exhumed remains of the 72 fighters were put in catacombs located between the chapel and the tombs. In addition to Polish fighters, this part of the cemetery also has graves and monuments to American (pilots from the Kościuszko Squadron) and French volunteers who fought on the Polish side, two monuments were dedicated to those Polish foreign allies. Underneath, an inscription "Mortui sunt ut liberi vivamus" ("They died so we could live free") was engraved on a semi-circular colonnade monument. A triumphal arch was flanked by two stone lions. The necropolis was never finished; its construction continued until the outbreak of the Second World War. Out of almost 3,000 tombs, 300 were dedicated to the Eaglets, as the young Polish defenders of the city from 1918 are known. In 1925 the ashes of one of the unknown defenders of Lwów were transferred to the Tomb of the Unknown Soldier in Warsaw.

== Wartime devastation and aftermath ==
After the Soviet invasion of Poland and the events of World War II, the city became part of Soviet Ukraine, and the Polish historical monuments located at the cemetery were devastated or neglected. The stone lions, the columnade, the monuments to foreign troops were removed. Up to 1971 many of the sculptures were destroyed; the cemetery of Lviv Eaglets was completely destroyed and turned into a truck depot. Soviets attempted to destroy the triumphal arch with tanks. In the 1970s, the majority of the tombs were razed with bulldozers.

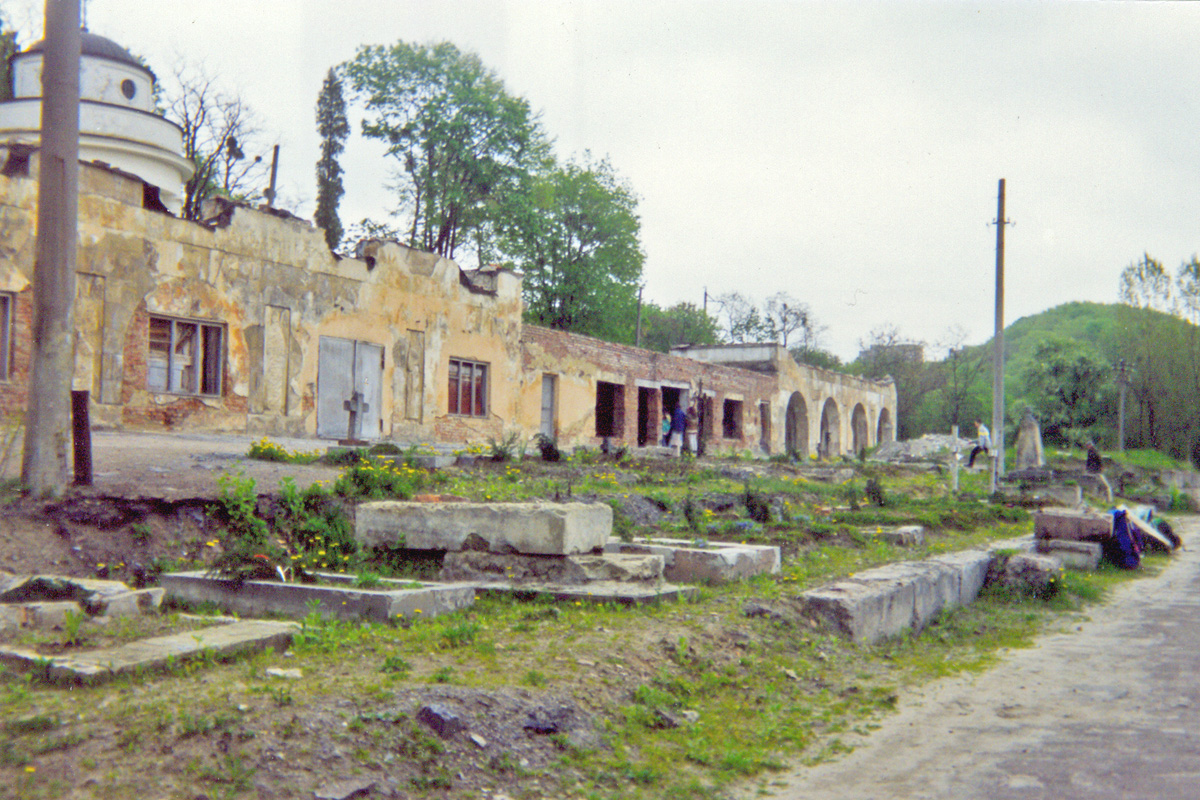
Cemetery of the Defenders of Lwów in 1997, after decades of neglect.

The Lwów Eaglets section was, however, not reopened for several decades, as the fact that many of the people buried there fought on the Polish side against the Ukrainians during the Polish-Ukrainian War generated some controversy. The issue has resurfaced several times in the Polish-Ukrainian relations; however, in 1989 the reconstruction works have begun, carried by local Polonia and Polish workers working temporarily in Lviv. Eventually the Cemetery of the Defenders of Lviv was reopened on 24 June 2005 when the Lviv City Council, which initially resisted the opening, eventually changed its mind, following Polish support for Ukraine's Orange Revolution (2004). President of Poland Aleksander Kwaśniewski and President of Ukraine Viktor Yushchenko, who attended the opening ceremony, agreed that the reconstruction and official opening represents a major improvement in Polish-Ukrainian relations.

== See also ==
- Lychakiv Cemetery
