= Arłamów Airfield =

Former aerodrome in Bircza

Arłamów Airfield Lotnisko Krajna
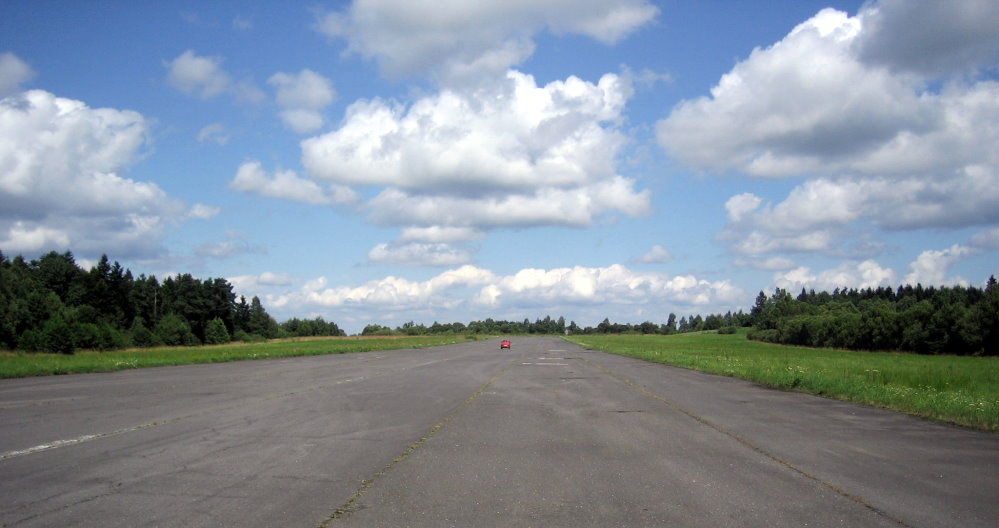
- IATA: none; ICAO: EPAR

Summary
- Airport type: Abandoned
- Operator: Dyrekcja Lasów Państwowych in Krosno
- Location: Bircza
- Elevation AMSL: 1,446 ft (441 m)
- Coordinates: 49°39′30″N 22°30′51″E
- Interactive map of Arłamów Airfield

Runways
Direction	Length		Surface
Direction	ft	m	Surface
16/34	4,330	1,320	Concrete/Bitumen

Arłamów Airfield (Polish: Lotnisko Krajna) (ICAO: EPAR) is a former government aerodrome in Arłamów, in the extreme southeast of Poland (near the Ukraine border), in gmina Bircza. The site is often referred to as Łodzinka Górna, Krajna, Trójca or Łomna (after nearby villages).

== History ==
The aerodrome was built in the late 1970s in the vicinity of a secret, luxurious, recreational complex called Arłamów. This exclusive, highly protected complex was situated in the midst of a heavily forested area that was accessible only with difficulty. Since it was highly popular among the chief representatives of the Polish Communist government, easy access to the facilities was badly needed, from which the concept of building a nearby airfield emerged.

Finding a suitable place for the aerodrome was not an easy task, since the surrounding terrain was hilly and densely forested. Finally, the engineers found a plateau on the grounds of the war-torn village of Krajna, 10 km NW of Arłamów. A 1,193 m-long (3,914 ft) and 35 m-wide (115 ft) concrete/bitumen runway was built, thus enabling the party and government officials to land safely in propeller aircraft and small jets. Since the Arłamów complex also hosted special international guests arriving in big jets, they were instead flown to Rzeszów-Jasionka Airport and then driven to Arłamów.

Beside the runway, an apron was built, but no terminal was needed—the arriving officials were immediately picked up by limousines and driven to the hotel. The runway's direction is 16/34 at an elevation of 441 metres (1,447 ft).

Since the collapse of the Iron Curtain, Arłamów and the airfield were both dissolved. In recent years the complex has re-opened as a tourist attraction. Arłamów Airfield is still there and in fairly good condition, but it is not maintained nor supervised. It is occasionally used for sport aviation, and chartered tourist flights, but landings are performed at one's own risk. More often, the runway is occupied by car-borne speed drivers.

=== Russo-Ukrainian War ===
In February 2022, US Troops from the 82nd Airborne Division landed at Arłamów airport and established a temporary base to defend NATO territory during the Russo-Ukrainian war. While it is not clear whether the airport has been used as a transit point for NATO equipment being sent to Ukraine, its proximity to the Ukrainian border (11 km) and the city of Lviv (110 km) make it the closest US Military base to the warzone. The US military has regularly conducted exercises at the airport with NATO allies throughout the course of the conflict.
