= Leszczawa =

Leszczawa may refer to the following places in Poland:

- Leszczawa Dolna
- Leszczawa Górna
