= Battle of Jawornik Ruski =

- Part of the Polish–Ukrainian conflict and anti-communist insurgencies in Central and Eastern Europe
Date	24 July 1946
Location	Jawornik Ruski, Subcarpathian Voivodeship
Result	Ukrainian victory

Belligerents
Ukrainian Insurgent Army	People's Republic of Poland

Commanders and leaders
Volodymyr Shchyhelskyi; Mykhailo Duda	Aleksander Wygnański; Tadeusz Wienc (executed)

Strength
700	280

Casualties and losses
Unknown	18 killed 17 wounded 14 executed

The Battle of Jawornik Ruski took place between the Ukrainian Insurgent Army (UPA) and Polish People's Army during anti-insurgent operation of 28th Infantry Regiment on 24 July 1946.

== Prelude ==
On 23 July, 1946, Polish forces stationed in Bircza received a report about large UPA force in Jawornik Ruski. Wygnański led his 200-strong detachment from Przemyśl, which were then joined by additional 80 troops from Babice, then crossed the San River. UPA withdrew to the forest and Polish troops occupied Jawornik Ruski. According to the captured insurgent, there was around 700 insurgents north of Yavornik Ruski.

== Battle ==
On 24 July, 28th Infantry Regiment begun operations in the forest near Jawornik Ruski. The goal was to liquidate UPA units that withdrew to the forest. Only outposts remained in Jawornik Ruski itself. UPA and Polish troops fought 6 clashes in the forest. At around 2 PM, insurgents attacked Jawornik Ruski where Polish forces were stationed. Heavy fighting took place between Polish troops and Ukrainian insurgents. Undaryk-6 unit attacked from the right side of Zohatyn, while Undaryk-4 would strike on the same side from Rybne. Undaryk-2 attacked from direction of the settlement. As a result, Polish troops stationed in the settlement were caught by surprise and forced to retreat. Polish forces suffered heavy losses and 14 soldiers of 28th Infantry Regiment were encircled by insurgents. 13 soldiers voluntarily surrendered, with total of 14 soldiers getting into captivity. Volodymyr Szczygielski transferred these captives to Mykhailo Duda. UPA commander Duda ordered to execute the captives. Polish losses were 18 killed, 17 wounded and 14 executed.

== Aftermath ==
For a long time the 14 executed Polish troops were presumed missing. In 2015, remains of 14 executed captives were discovered, who were determined to have been executed by shooting and thrown into the ditch. On 18 July, 2016, their remains were extracted. Seven of them were identified, among whom were Lt. Tadeusz Wienc. Examinations also shown signs of torture before execution. Both of the UPA commanders Volodymyr Szczygielski and Mykhailo Duda were identified as perpetrators of this crime. On 29 July, 2022, the executed were given ceremonial burial.
