= Malawa =

Malawa may refer to the following places:

- Malawa, Przemyśl County, Poland
- Malawa, Rzeszów County, Poland
- Malawa, Niger
