= Krajna (disambiguation) =

Krajna is a forested historical region in Poland.

Krajna may also refer to the following places:

- Krajna, Gmina Bircza, Poland
- Krajna, Tišina, Slovenia
- Krajna, Croatia, in Čačinci
