= Rudawka =

Rudawka may refer to the following places in Poland:

- Rudawka, Augustów County in Podlaskie Voivodeship (north-east Poland)
- Rudawka, Sejny County in Podlaskie Voivodeship (north-east Poland)
- Rudawka, Sokółka County in Podlaskie Voivodeship (north-east Poland)
- Rudawka, Subcarpathian Voivodeship (south-east Poland)
