= Kotow =

Kotow may refer to:

- Kotów, Podkarpackie Voivodeship, A village in Poland
- Kowtow, act of prostration in Imperial Chinese protocol
