= Łodzinka Dolna =

- Village
- Location within Poland
- Coordinates: 49°41′N 22°34′E
- Country: Poland
- Voivodeship: Subcarpathian
- County: Przemyśl
- Gmina: Bircza

Łodzinka Dolna [wɔˈd͡ʑiŋka ˈdɔlna] is a former village in the administrative district of Gmina Bircza, within Przemyśl County, Subcarpathian Voivodeship, in south-eastern Poland.
