= Żohatyn =

- Village
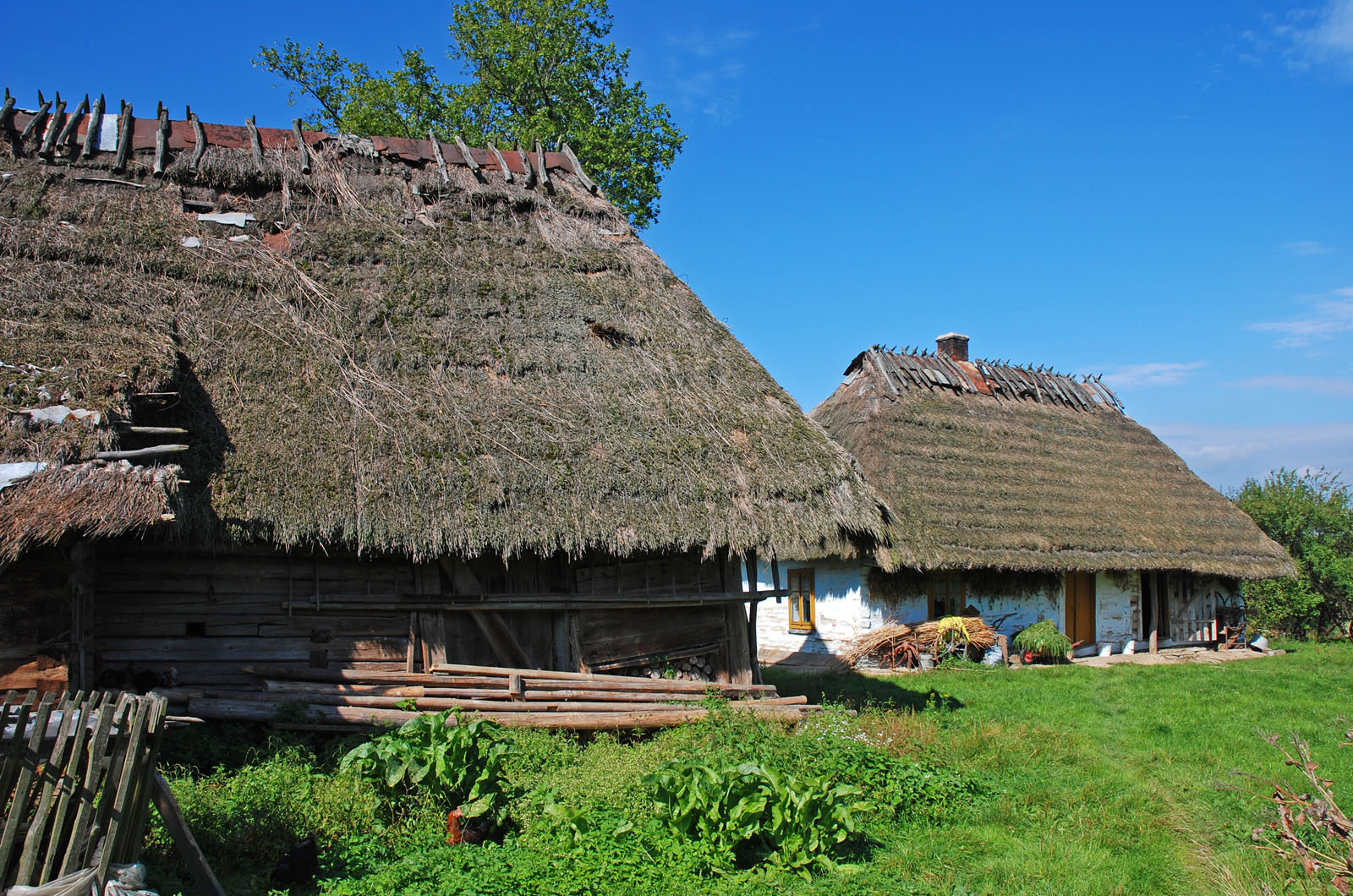
- Open-air museum; cottage and barn

- Location within Poland
- Coordinates: 49°41′N 22°28′E
- Country: Poland
- Voivodeship: Subcarpathian
- County: Przemyśl
- Gmina: Bircza
- Population: 160

Żohatyn [ʐɔˈxatɨn] is a small village in the administrative district of Gmina Bircza, within Przemyśl County, Subcarpathian Voivodeship, in south-eastern Poland.
