= Mykhailo Verbytskyi =

Ukrainian Catholic priest and composer (1815–1870)

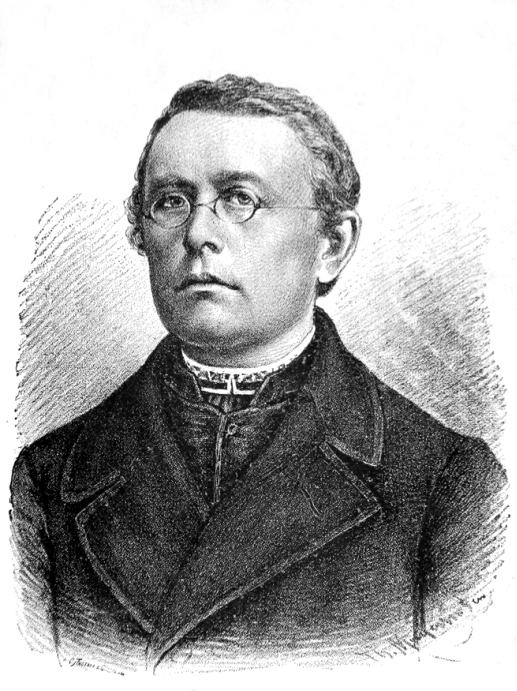
c.1870 lithograph of Verbytskyi

Mykhailo Mykhailovych Verbytskyi (Ukrainian: Михайло Михайлович Вербицький [mɪˈxɑjlo mɪˈxɑjlowɪtʃ werˈbɪtsʲkɪj]; March 4, 1815 – December 7, 1870), also anglicized as Michael Werbitzky, was a Ukrainian composer and a priest of the Ukrainian Greek Catholic Church. He is considered to be one of the first professional composers of Galicia. He is best known for composing the melody to the national anthem of Ukraine.

Verbytskyi's national anthem became widely played by orchestras and musicians around the world in support of Ukraine as a result of the Russian invasion of Ukraine.

== Biography ==
Mykhailo Verbytskyi was born in Nadsiannia. Sources often differ as to the exact location of his birth, with some claiming he was born in Jawornik Ruski and christened 8 km away in Ulucz (the site of the oldest wooden church in Poland where his father was the local priest). Both are now located in the Subcarpathian Voivodeship, Poland.

Verbytskyi was born into the family of a priest. He was left an orphan at the age of ten, and was raised from then on by his father's brother, Bishop Ivan Snihurskyi. Snihurskyi took Mykhailo to live with him in Peremyshl, where his uncle was very active: founding the city's first Ukrainian language printing press, published compilations of folklore and textbooks about the Ukrainian language. In 1818, Snihurskyi even founded a diak-teaching institute in the city, and ten years later, a cathedral choir and music school. Verbytskyi was therefore placed in a very active and creative environment.

In 1833, Verbytskyi entered the Theological Seminary in Lviv. Here he became seriously engaged in music, learning to play the guitar, which became his favourite musical instrument. He eventually wrote a textbook teaching how to play the guitar and wrote pieces for the instrument. Because of financial problems, he twice had to leave the Seminary, but he eventually graduated and became a priest.

By the order of Father Y. Lozinsky (the then governor of Yavoriv County), in May 1852, he was transferred to the parish of the village of Zaluzhia in Yavoriv County, where he served until August 1853. From 1853 to 1856, he served as the administrator of the chapel on the hill in the village of Strilky in the Sambir raion of Lviv oblast. The chapel, built in 1792, did not survive, but on its site now stands the Church of St. Eustace, which is listed as a local landmark. A memorial plaque indicates that Father Mykhailo Verbytskyi served in the church. Below the hill stood a wooden rectory where he once lived. However, it did not survive either, as a new one was built on its site in 1902. The local school is named after him, and for fifteen years now, festivals of spiritual music named after Father Mykhailo Verbytskyi have been held in Strilky, attracting the best church and school choirs from the district and the region.

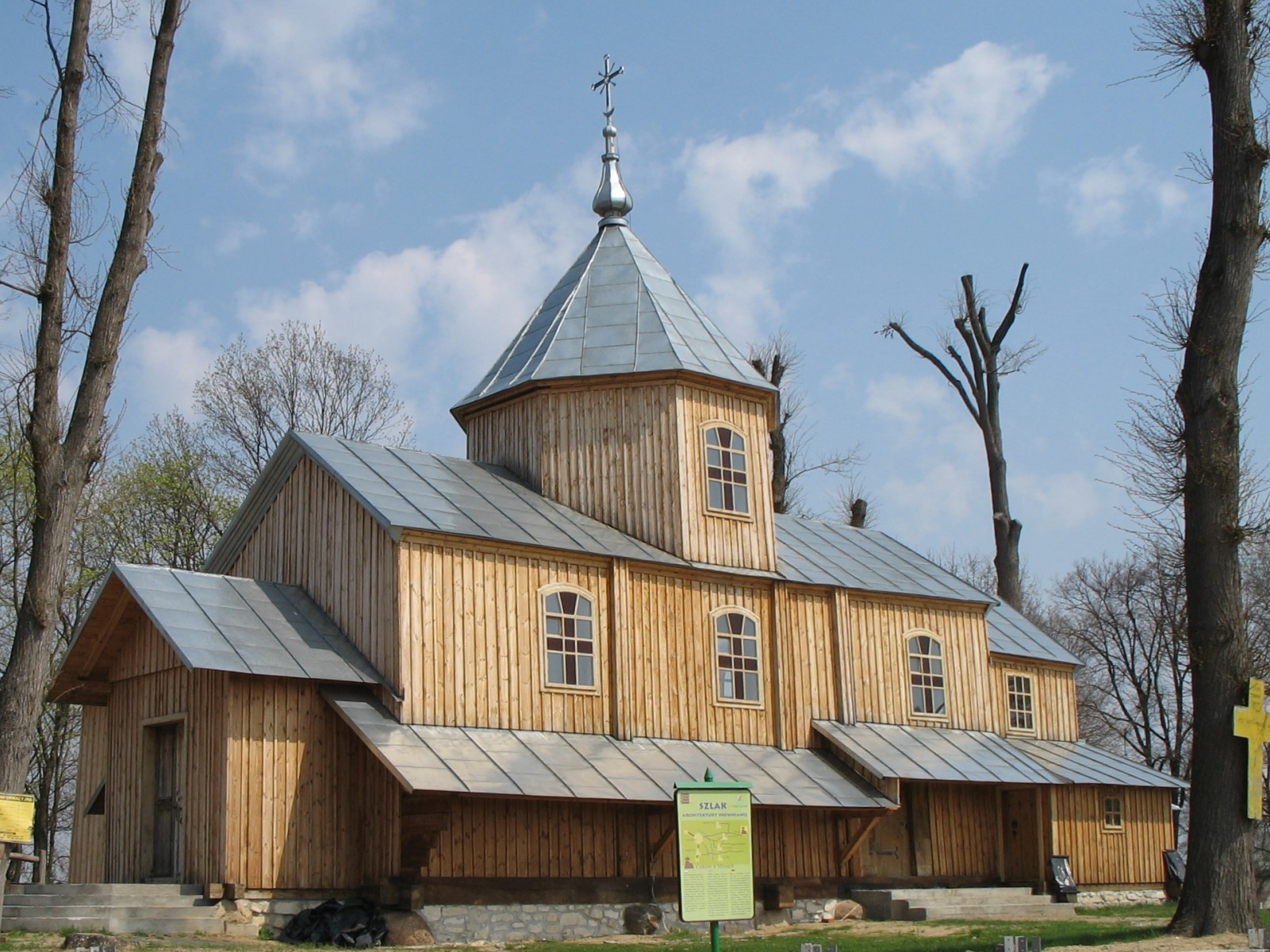
The church in the village of Mlyny, where Verbystkyi spent much of his life.

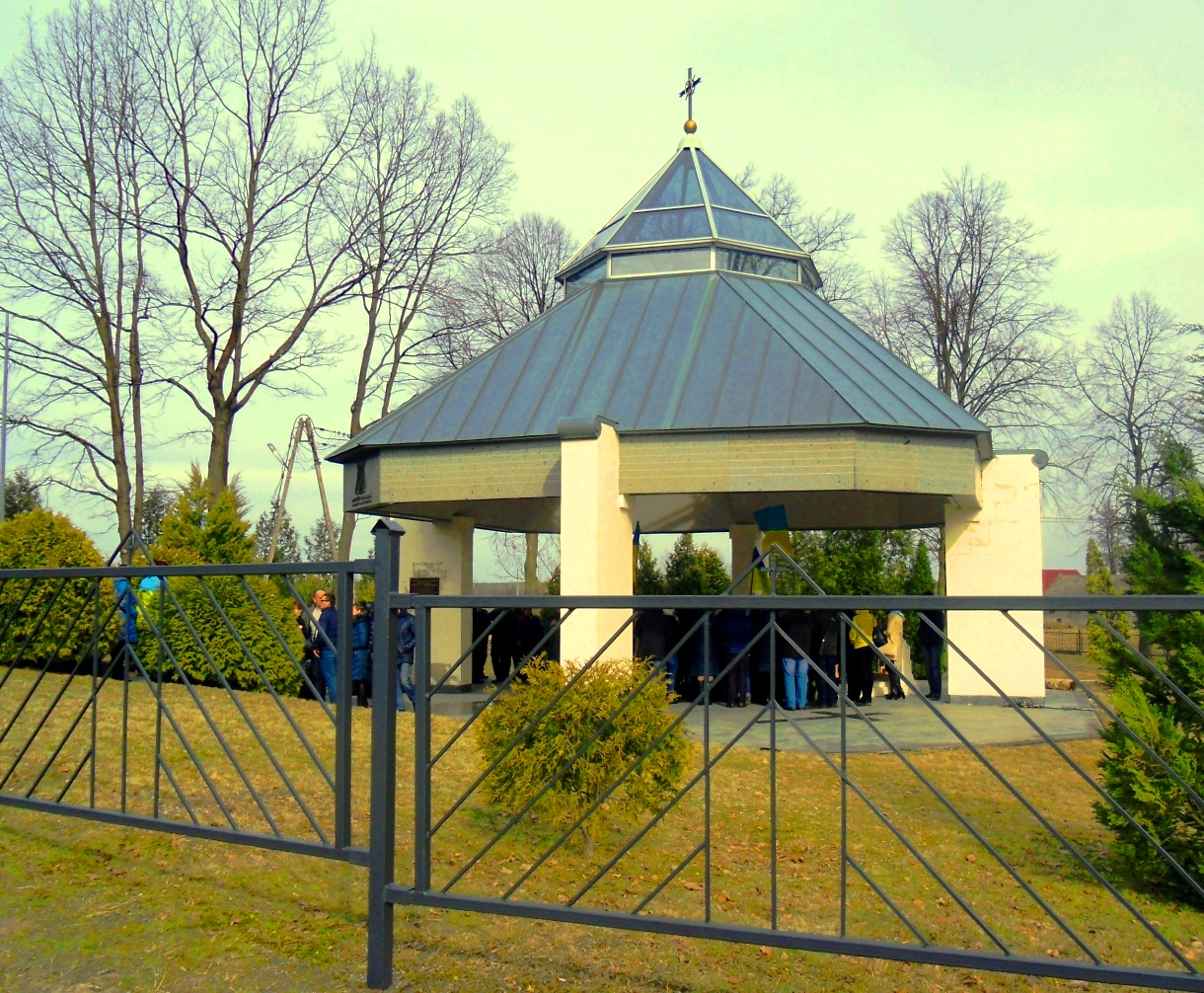
Chapel of the over the graves of priests Mykhailo Verbytskyi and Oleksa Velychko in the village of Mlyny.

In 1859 Verbytskyi received a parish in the village of Mlyny, Yavoriv county, where he would live and work for the rest of his life. As a priest he wrote many liturgical compositions, which are still sung throughout the Galicia region. Some of these include Єдинородний Сине (Only-begotten Son), Святий Боже (Holy God), Алилуя (Alleluia), Отче наш (Our Father), and Хваліте Господа з небес (Praise the Lord from the heavens).

== Music ==
As a composer he helped lay the foundations for the development of modern Ukrainian music. His works are formally unsophisticated, often strophic, and usually in the minor mode; but his stage works (notably Prostachka (‘The Simpleton’), 1870) are representative of a popular folk genre that was melodically fluid, singable, pictorial and emotionally evocative. His instrumental writing does not extend far beyond the simple development of folktunes. Nevertheless, he composed 12 symphonies (overtures), on the sixth of which Stanyslav Lyudkevych based an orchestral piece and a piano trio. He also composed Zapovit (‘Testament’, 1868), a setting of Shevchenko's poem for bass solo, double choir and orchestra, the operetta Pidhiriany which was staged in Lemberg (now Lviv, 1864), and numerous sacred and secular choral works and songs. He is best known as the composer of the Ukrainian national anthem by the words of Pavlo Chubynsky Shche ne vmerla Ukraina (‘Ukraine has not Perished’), which in 1917 was adopted by the new Ukrainian republican government.

=== Compositions ===
Musicologist Uliana Petrus has put together a list of 133 known compositions by Mykhailo Verbytskyi. These include:

- Large scale secular choral works - 30
- Sacred choral works - 37
- Vocal ensembles
- Art songs - 10
- Arrangements of folk songs - 10
- Orchestral works - 18 works including 9 symphonies
- Chamber works
- 15 works for various instruments
- Music to 12 stage works

== Commemoration ==
In 2005 the chapel-pantheon over the tomb of Mykhailo Verbytskyi was opened to mark the 140th anniversary of Ukrainian national anthem and 190th anniversary of its composer.

== See also ==
- List of Ukrainian composers

== Sources ==
- Andriy V. Szul. The New Grove Dictionary of Opera, edited by Stanley Sadie (1992). ISBN 0-333-73432-7 and ISBN 1-56159-228-5
- Загайкевич, Марія Михайло Вербицький - Сторінки життя і творчості - Львів, 1998 ISBN 966-02-0819-7
