= Jasienica Sufczyńska =

- Village
- Location within Poland
- Coordinates: 49°46′N 22°27′E
- Country: Poland
- Voivodeship: Subcarpathian
- County: Przemyśl
- Gmina: Bircza

Jasienica Sufczyńska [jaɕɛˈnit͡sa sufˈt͡ʂɨɲska] is a village in the administrative district of Gmina Bircza, within Przemyśl County, Subcarpathian Voivodeship, in south-eastern Poland.
