= Leszczawka =

- Village
- Location within Poland
- Coordinates: 49°38′23″N 22°24′44″E
- Country: Poland
- Voivodeship: Subcarpathian
- County: Przemyśl
- Gmina: Bircza

Leszczawka [lɛʂˈt͡ʂafka] is a village in the administrative district of Gmina Bircza, within Przemyśl County, Subcarpathian Voivodeship, in south-eastern Poland.
