= Sufczyna =

- Village
- Location within Poland
- Coordinates: 49°44′N 22°29′E
- Country: Poland
- Voivodeship: Subcarpathian
- County: Przemyśl
- Gmina: Bircza
- Population: 293

Sufczyna [sufˈt͡ʂɨna] is a village in the administrative district of Gmina Bircza, within Przemyśl County, Subcarpathian Voivodeship, in south-eastern Poland.
