= Młyny, Podkarpackie Voivodeship =

Młyny
- Village
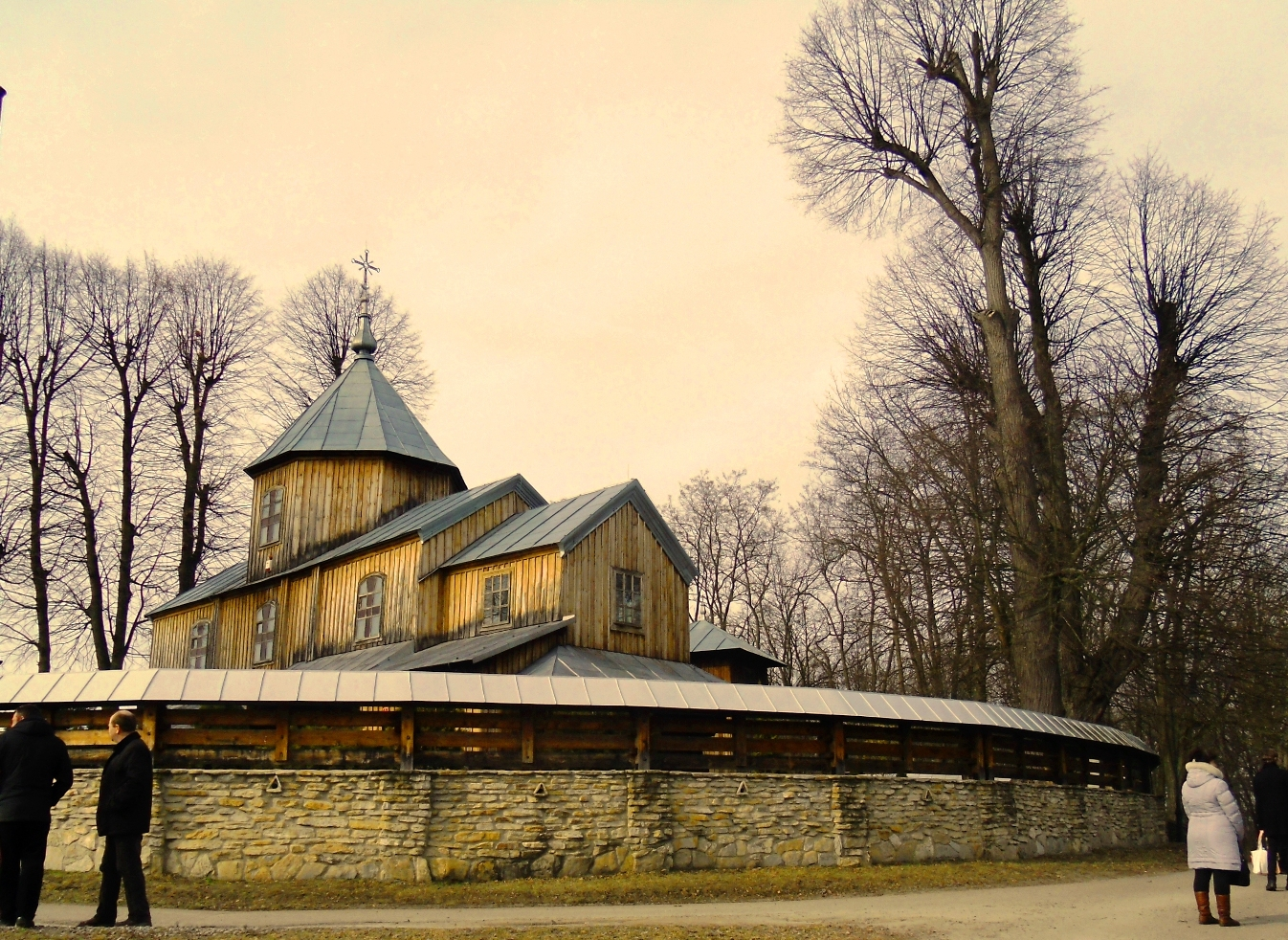
- Wooden Greek Catholic church (approx. 1740). Now Our Lady of Consolation Catholic Church.

- Location within Poland
- Coordinates: 49°58′N 23°4′E
- Country: Poland
- Voivodeship: Subcarpathian
- County: Jarosław
- Gmina: Radymno

Młyny [ˈmwɨnɨ] is a village in the administrative district of Gmina Radymno, within Jarosław County, Subcarpathian Voivodeship, in south-eastern Poland, close to the border with Ukraine.

== History and attractions ==
The village Młyny has arisen from the ashes of the city Dropaty, that was destroyed during the Polish-Ottoman War (1672-76). Now the Młyny village located at the border between Poland and Ukraine along the Shklo River. The population of the village is about 315 people.

In the village preserved wooden of Protection of the Blessed Virgin Mary church of Ukrainian Greek Catholic Church (1733). The church in the village Mlyny was consecrated as Our Lady of Consolation Catholic Church after deportation of Ukrainian populations, that was held from Poland (1944 – 46).

Parish priest the church from 1856 to 1870 was Mykhailo Verbytsky (1815-1870), author of the anthem of Ukraine "Shche ne vmerla Ukraina". Mykhailo Verbytsky had died in 1870 and was buried in the village Mlyny near of the Church in the chapel, which is built over the graves of priests of Mykhailo Verbytsky and Oleksa Velychko.

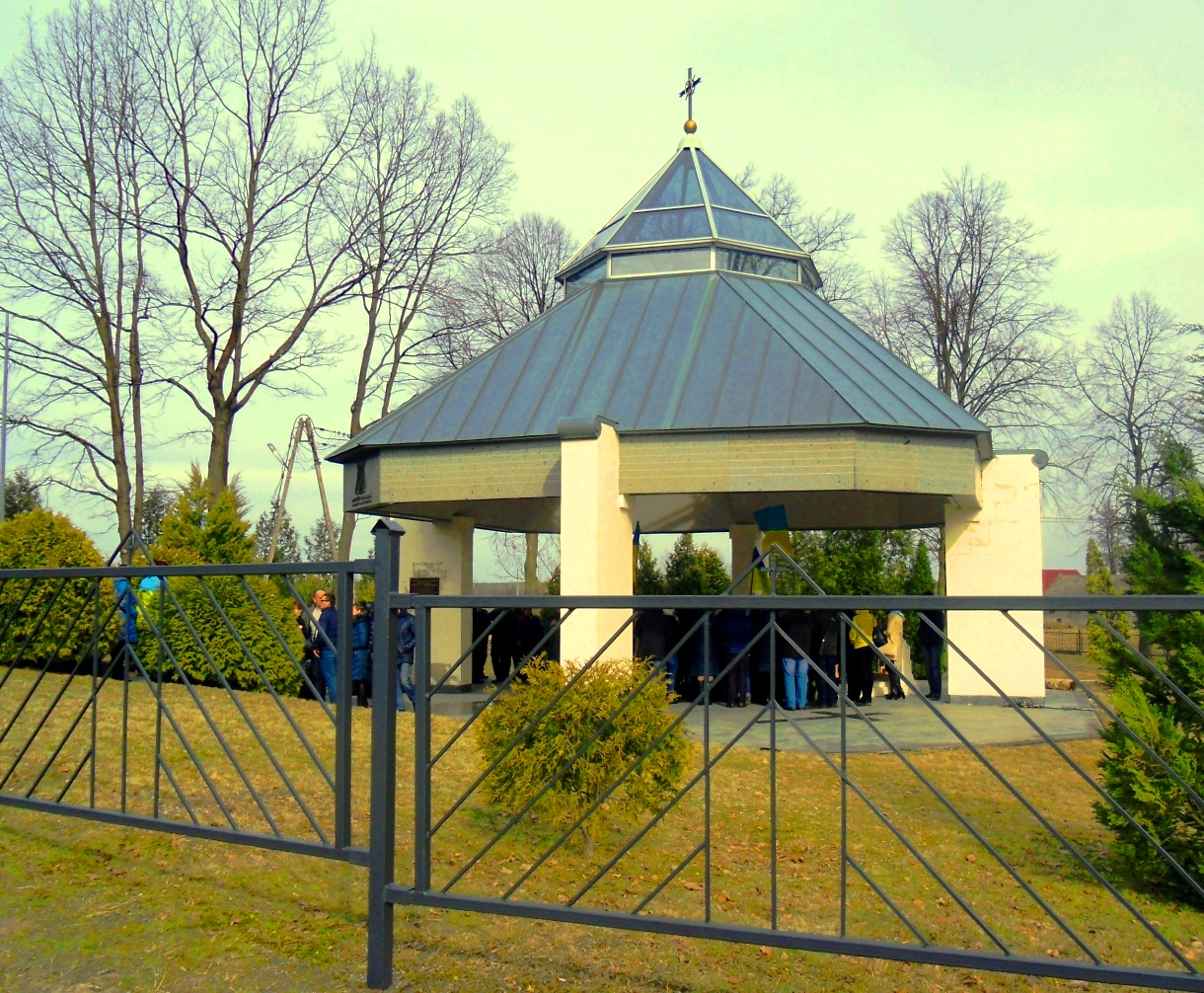
Chapel of the over the graves of priests in the village Mlyny.
