= Arłamów =

- Village
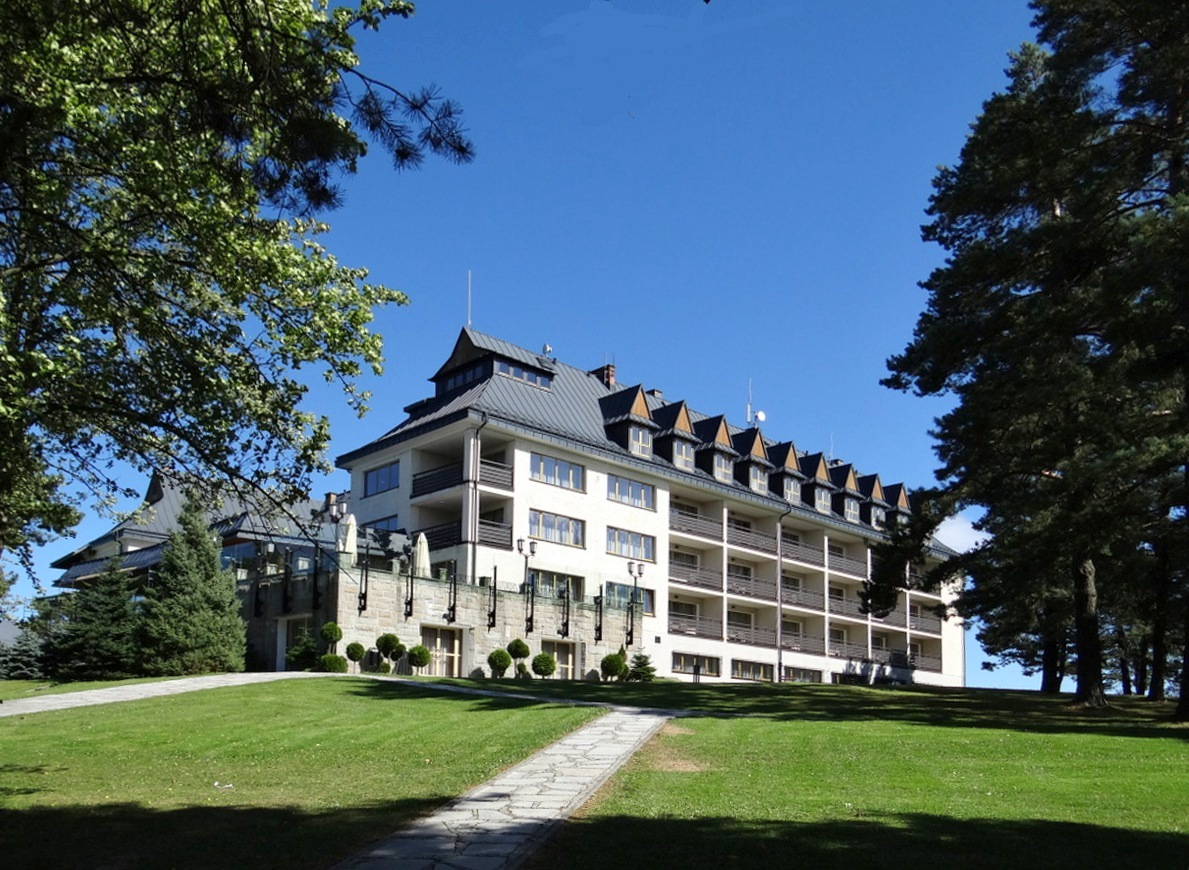
- Former recreational facility of the Polish communist government

- Location within Poland
- Coordinates: 49°35′4″N 22°39′45″E
- Country: Poland
- Voivodeship: Subcarpathian
- County: Bieszczady
- Gmina: Ustrzyki Dolne

Arłamów [arˈwamuf] is a village in the administrative district of Gmina Ustrzyki Dolne, within Bieszczady County, Subcarpathian Voivodeship, in south-eastern Poland, near the border with Ukraine.

The village is most well known for being the location of the recreational facility of the communist government, one of the few such places with its own airport and heliport. In 1989 after the fall of communism in Poland the facility was converted into a hotel and a sports complex, notably hosting the Poland national football team, including for Euro 2016 and Wisła Kraków in pre-season 2020.
