= Stara Bircza =

- Village
- Location within Poland
- Coordinates: 49°41′26″N 22°27′32″E
- Country: Poland
- Voivodeship: Podkarpackie
- County: Przemyśl
- Gmina: Bircza

Stara Bircza [ˈstara ˈbirt͡ʂa] is a village in the administrative district of Gmina Bircza, within Przemyśl County, Podkarpackie Voivodeship, in south-eastern Poland.
