= Battles of Bircza =

Armed clashes in 1945–1946

Battles for Bircza
- Part of Polish-Ukrainian ethnic conflict
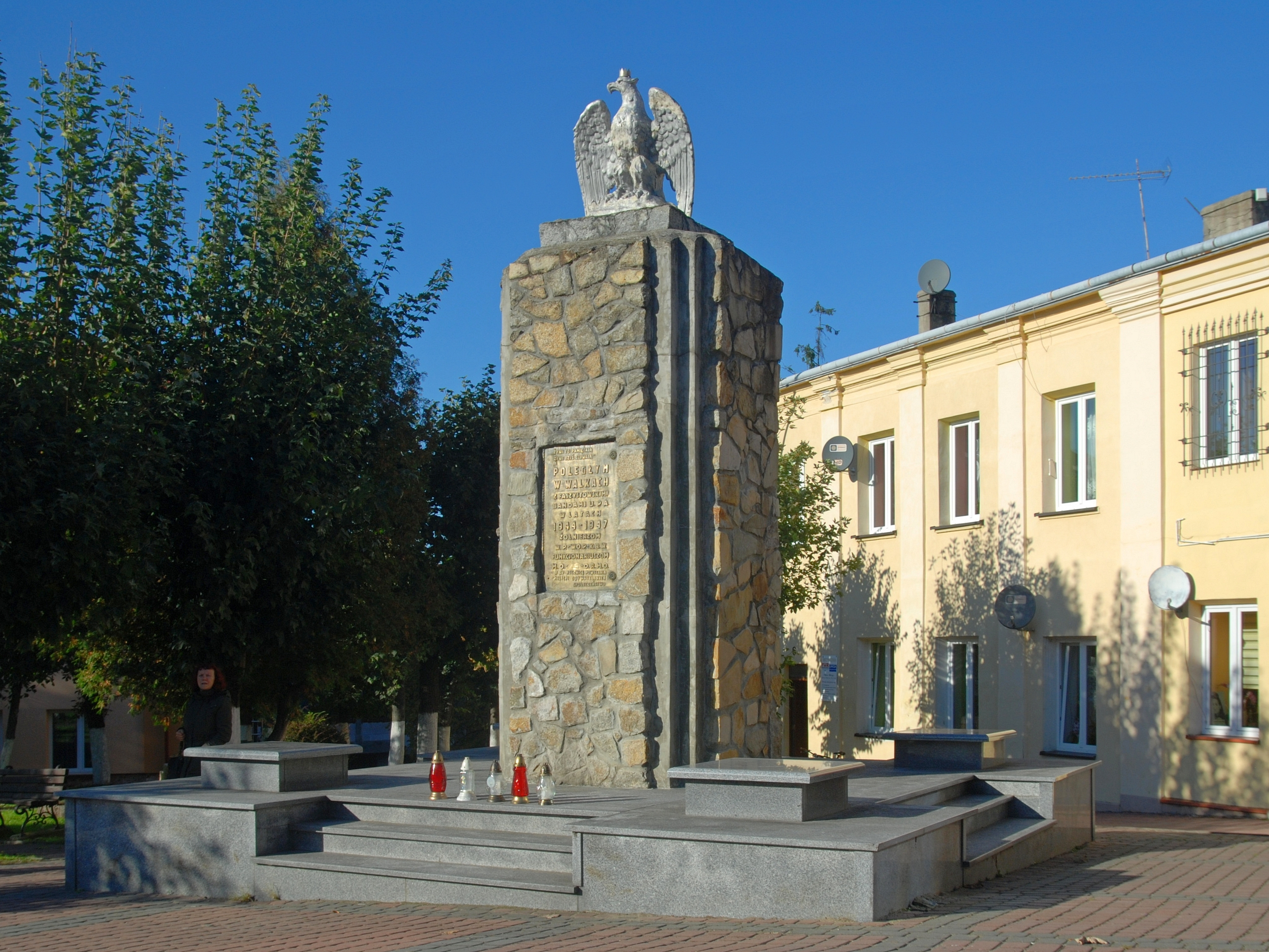
- Monument to the fallen soldiers of the LWP, KBW, functionaries of MO, ORMO and UBP at the town square in Bircza
| Date | October 21, 1945 – January 7, 1946 |
| Location | Bircza, Polish People's Republic |
| Result | Polish victory |

Belligerents
| Ukrainian Insurgent Army | People's Republic of Poland |

Commanders and leaders
| First Attack; Martin Mizerny; Pawło Wacyk; Second Attack; Volodymyr Shchygelskyi; Third Attack; Volodymyr Shchygelskyi; Hryhoriy Yankivskyi; Mykhailo Galyo †; Dmytro Karvanskyi † | Aleksander Wygnański; Witold Hryniewicz †; Jan Pietroś †; Piotr Skakun †; Jan Wróblewski †; Michal Jaskulski |

Strength
| Unknown | Unknown |

Casualties and losses
- See Casualties of the First Attack; See Casualties of the Second Attack; See Casualties of the Third Attack

The battles of Bircza were a series of Ukrainian Insurgent Army attacks on the town of Bircza.

== Prelude ==
During the first period of the Polish garrison (from August 1944) there were no elaborate defenses in Bircza. In the course of time, the soldiers of various battalions prepared individual sections of the defense according to their needs, digging trenches with covered shelters and connecting ditches. In the center of the town, on the market square, artillery and mortars were placed in dug-in positions to support the defensive lines with fire.

The defense was divided into three company areas, reinforced by CKM platoons. During the night the whole battalion remained at its posts. During the day, only observation was carried out, so the soldiers took turns resting and some of the subunit's personnel mostly operated in the surrounding area. The access roads to Bircza were controlled and blocked by military posts. The buildings were not particularly fortified, nor were wire entanglements or minefields used.

The weakness of the defense was that it was easy to see the system of firing points and the number of soldiers from the neighboring hills. Bircza also had a civilian population (both residents and refugees from neighboring villages), which Ukrainian intelligence presumably used to recruit its informants.

The top command and the 2nd and 3rd battalions of the 28th IR were stationed in Bircza at the time. A collecting battalion from the 17th IR (subordinated to the commander of the 28th IR) was stationed there, as well as a divisional reconnaissance company, which operated during the day in the field and came to this village for night rest. The garrison was commanded by Lt. Col. Aleksander Wygnański.

In addition, Bircza was home to a group of demobilized soldiers from the division's units, since here they were assigned a rallying point from which they were to depart on October 23–24 for Przemyśl. Some of the demobilized no longer had weapons, but some managed to get to the outposts and take part in repelling the attack.

== First attack ==
First Attack on Bircza
- Part of the Polish-Ukrainian ethnic conflict
| Date | 22 October 1945 |
| Location | Bircza, Polish People's Republic |
| Result | Inconclusive |

Belligerents
| Ukrainian Insurgent Army | People's Republic of Poland |

Commanders and leaders
| Mykhailo Duda (WIA); Wasyl Mizerny; Pawło Wacyk | Aleksander Wygnański |

Strength
| 330–430+ | Unknown |

Casualties and losses
| 4+ killed 9 wounded | 19 killed 28 wounded 30 captured |
- 11 Polish civilians killed

The Ukrainian Insurgent Army (UPA) launched its first attack on Bircza on October 22, 1945, at 11:30 p.m. It was initiated by a small subdivision - a 30-man chota dressed in Polish uniforms. It marched in compact formation along the road from the direction of Przemyśl, thus confusing observers, and managed to approach close to the military outpost. Stopped by the soldiers and summoned to give the password, the UPA unit suddenly opened fire. At the same time, they fired white rockets, a signal to attack the Bircza garrison.

The core of the Ukrainian forces consisted of the "Rena", "Yara" and "Dry" units, as well as other unrecognized ones, belonging organizationally to the raiding "Podkarpacie" kuren under the command of "Prut". In addition, several nearby SKWs took part in the attack. The attackers wore white armbands on their left sleeves.

The group advancing along the road from Przemyśl, despite suffering losses, broke into Bircza, killing soldiers and civilian residents they encountered along the way. The main attack was directed by the UPA unit at the building housing the command and the area of the Orthodox church. Communication with the outposts of the defending soldiers was broken. The fighting inside the town lasted four hours. The regiment's headquarters was not captured, but more than a dozen buildings were burned.

Simultaneously with the attack on Bircza, another large UPA unit, in which the "Hromenko" sotnias, the SKW "Baron" militia and the SB "Pieti" militia were recognized, with a strength of about 300-400 men under the command of "Hromenko," launched an attack on Kuzmin, 10 km southwest of Bircza, to stop a possible relief for Bircza.

The 30th IR was stationed there at the time, and one platoon of the 28th IR, commanded by Lt. Karol Romanowski, who had been sent earlier to that village to pick up a contingent, was deployed on the edge of that village, in the area of the post office. Most of the Ukrainian insurgents wore MO armbands on their left sleeves to deceive their enemies. The main attack was directed at the area where the regiment's headquarters were located, and in this direction a sizable group managed to penetrate into the center of the village. A hand-to-hand fight ensued. After a two-and-a-half-hour battle, the UPA withdrew.

=== Casualties of the first attack ===
Polish losses amounted to nine dead soldiers, including one officer, Capt. Witold Hryniewicz - assistant chief of staff of the 28th IR - and five wounded. In addition, 11 civilians were killed. 10 residential buildings, a people's house, an army barracks and a sawmill were burned. In addition, up to 30 soldiers were taken prisoner; after propaganda talks they were released. On the UPA side, several partisans were killed.

Kuzmin's own losses were more severe. Most of the village was burned, the buildings in the area of the post office survived. 10 soldiers were killed; one officer - commander of the 3rd mortar company, Lt. Jan Pietroś - four non-commissioned officers and five privates. 23 soldiers were wounded: three officers - battalion commander Capt. Piotr Skakun, company commander Lt. Jan Wróblewski and adjutant to the regimental commander Lt. Michal Jaskulski, and nine NCOs. Lost were: 14 horses, three carts, a radio station and 10 km of telephone cable. UPA losses amounted to four killed (including "Baron") and nine wounded (including "Hromenko").

As a result of the fighting for Bircza and Kuzmin, a subdivision of the 40th pal was transferred to Bircza, and the communications and cooperation system was improved. The first attack on Bircza ended inconclusively, while the Ukrainian Insurgent Army (UPA) managed to penetrate the town, causing casualties and damage, they were unable to fully capture their objectives or decisively defeat the Polish garrison. Despite the attackers breaking into Bircza and engaging in combat for several hours, the Polish regiment's headquarters remained uncaptured, and the UPA forces eventually withdrew.

== Second attack ==
Second Attack on Bircza
- Part of the Polish-Ukrainian ethnic conflict
| Date | 29 November 1945 |
| Location | Bircza, Polish People's Republic |
| Result | Inconclusive |

Belligerents
| Ukrainian Insurgent Army | People's Republic of Poland |

Commanders and leaders
| Volodymyr Shchygelskyi | Aleksander Wygnański |

Strength
| 300–400 | 100+ |

Casualties and losses
| Polish claim: 8 killed Ukrainian claim: Several wounded | 3 killed 6 captured |

The Ukrainian Insurgent Army launched its second attack on Bircza at 22:00 on November 29, on a bright moonlit night, supported by mortar fire. The size of the Ukrainian forces could not be determined, but some sources estimate there were 300–400 insurgents. At the time, the garrison of Bircza consisted of a collecting battalion of the 17th ID, operationally subordinated to the commander of the 9th ID. In addition, there was an MO company and a KBW company in Bircza. Bircza was shelled with mortar and machine gun fire. After a five-hour battle, at around 3:00 a.m., the UPA retreated. However, this attack was a sham; UPA didn't seek to capture Bircza. In reality, UPA's aim was to burn the villages around Bircza: Stara Bircza, Rudawka, Boguszowka, Korzeńec, Lomna and Huta Brzuska, a task that was accomplished.

During the battle, negligence was observed on the Polish side in terms of insurance, command, training and tactics. The collecting battalion of the 17th

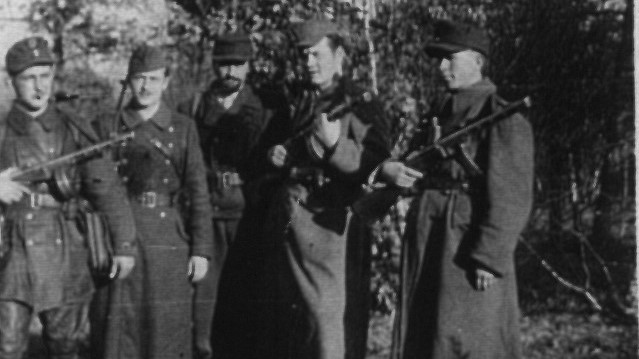
Polish Soldiers at Bircza

DP did not present a high combat value, primarily due to poor combat training.

In order to prevent relief from Przemyśl, the road was blocked with felled telephone poles and trees. Notified by radio of the attack, the commander of the 9th DP immediately sent an emergency subdivision from Przemyśl to help, in the strength of one infantry company (about 100 soldiers) on four trucks, but due to the blockage of the road the unit did not reach the place.

=== Casualties of the second attack ===
As a result, during the second assault on Bircza, three Polish soldiers were killed and six taken prisoner were quickly released. Ukrainian losses are not fully known. According to Ginalski and Wysokinski, there were eight dead; the UPA reports several wounded, one of whom died. The UPA unit was commanded by Volodymyr Shchygielski, who was executed four years later in Rzeszow for the crimes of Ukrainian partisans.

== Third attack ==
Third Attack on Bircza
- Part of the Polish-Ukrainian ethnic conflict
| Date | 7 January 1946 |
| Location | Bircza, Polish People's Republic |
| Result | Polish victory |

Belligerents
| Ukrainian Insurgent Army | People's Republic of Poland |

Commanders and leaders
| Volodymyr Shchygelskyi; Hryhoriy Yankivskyi; Mykhailo Galyo †; Dmytro Karvanskyi † | Aleksander Wygnański |

Strength
| Unknown | 1,100+ |

Casualties and losses
| Polish claim: 140 killed 12 captured Ukrainian claim: 23 killed 22 wounded | Polish claim: 9 wounded Ukrainian claim: 70 killed |

=== Planning ===
The author of the attack plan was Lieutenant Mykhailo Galo "Konyk." The purpose of the attack was to destroy the People's Polish Army garrison quartered in the city, destroy the Civic Militia post, the office of the displacement committee, and burn down the city.

The attack was set for 2 a.m. Eastern Christmas Eve. However, as a result of various obstacles, it began in the various sections not at the same time - around 3:00 am.

The cure was divided into two groups - eastern and western.

The eastern group, that is, sotnia U-4 ("Burlaki") and U-7 ("Lastivki"), under the overall command of "Burlaki" were to lead the attack from the southeast (U-4) and northeast (U-7), with the aim of tying up the defenders with fire and diverting their attention from the north and southwest directions, from where the main attack was to come. In addition, the U-4 sotnia was to capture the bunkers near the palace and destroy the palace itself, the Citizen's Militia post and nearby houses.

The 511 squad was to create a barrage on the road south of Bircza, thus protecting the rear of the attacking Chots 510 and 512. The 510 squad took up a position on the escarpment east of the palace (50 m from the Polish bunkers), and the 512 squad took up a position in the Stupnica River, near the bridge west of Bircza.

The western group operated with two subdivisions, independently of each other - from the southwest U-6 ("Jara"), and from the northwest U-2 under the command of "Orski." There was also a position of the commander-in-chief "Konyk" at U-2. The western group also included a detachment of the Bezpeky Service (in chota strength). The units of the western group, overcoming the expected Polish resistance, were to join in the center of Bircza.

The Polish UPA reconnaissance estimated the Polish forces at 960 LWP infantry soldiers (it was a reinforced 2nd battalion of the 26th pp), in addition to about 140 militiamen in Bircza, and two trucks of NKVD troops, arriving the previous day. A mounted maneuvering group of about 100 soldiers was also stationed in Bircza, but in the evening it left for action in Dobra Szlachecka.

=== The attack ===
The main attack of the U-2 sotnia was led personally by "Konyk" from the direction of Novaya Ves. The assault was supposed to begin at 2 a.m., but due to the rough road it started at 2:45 a.m. The units marched in the following order: chota 504, 506, SB militia and chota 505. The column was very stretched, when the leading subunit was already reaching Bircza, the last chota was still at Nowa Wieś. "Konyk", along with the leading squad, stopped 300 meters from Bircza and waited for the commanders of the other subunits. At that moment, shots were heard in the section attacked by "Jara." "Konyk" gave the order to attack to the left, running.

Between the buildings of the suburbs, only the tyral of chota 504 "Pavlenko", at which "Konyk" and "Orśkyj" were located, managed to penetrate. Chots 504 and 505 of "Bartel" and "Chaika", which were further away, were late in their assault, having already entered the area lit by the burning building, and suffered heavy losses. The first building had not yet burned down when the next one caught fire. Subdivisions 505 and 506 were well lit, and attacked the brick building of the district office, located on a high slope, so they suffered heavy losses.

In addition, another building on the road to Nowa Wieś caught fire, and again illuminated the attack area, making it easier for the Polish to fire.

Without any coordination with the previous strike, the U-6 squadron developed its attack from the side of the forest on the hill rising on the left side of the stream that flowed into Stupnica behind the new Orthodox church. Chota 518 - commander probably "Sukatyj", operating on the left wing, instead of going under the Orthodox church, went out to the Polish defense position on Kamienna Hill, while chotnias 516 (commander "Sahajdak") and 517 (commander "Buk") arbitrarily withdrew under fire into the forest. "Jar" ordered the 518 chota to retreat to its starting position, and himself returned to bring both subunits back. Chota 518 finally succeeded in forcing its way into the town near the old Orthodox church and broke through up the hill to the Old Cemetery, where it joined up with the chotas led by "Jar."

The Polish counterattack pushed the chotts into the defenders' abandoned trenches south of the city, from which they were finally driven out at 6 o'clock, i.e., 15 minutes after the "Orski" sotnia's attack was liquidated. This made it possible for the defenders to go out to Valkova Mountain and to fire mortar rounds at the subunits of the "Burlaki" grouping, which was still fighting.

Even before the U-4 unit took up positions, shots rang out on the right wing, in the direction of the U-7 sotnia's march, which alerted the Polish defense. The Poles took up positions in bunkers near the palace, the MO post, and a brick church surrounded by a stone wall, and a nearby brick school, and began illuminating the foreground with rockets and searchlights, and massed shelling.

Czota 510 tried to locate the sources of the shelling, firing once from the left and once from the right wing. The other half of the unit then located Polish fortifications, and tried to destroy them. Chota 512 was doing the same. By this time, fire was seen and losses were heard on the opposite side of the town, which meant that all the troops had already moved in. Chota 512 was ordered to fire at the bunkers and the courthouse. Meanwhile, the 510 chota was advancing on the bunkers. Advancing by leaps, it captured first the trenches in front of the bunkers and then the bunkers themselves, and set them on fire. Chota 512, advancing by leaps and bounds and partially crawling along the creek and ditches on both sides of the road, approached the MO post and church, and destroyed one bunker along with a mortar and HMG, and burned ten wooden houses.

At about 7 a.m. the unit withdrew to its starting positions and, with its left wing, made contact with the U-4 sotnia of "Burlak," operating on the section from the bridge, on the Przemyśl highway - chota 512, the leader of "Wańka" in the direction of Wola Korzeniecka chota 510. Burlak did not allow the "Lastivka" sotnia to leave the battlefield so as not to expose his right wing. This is how both sotnias persevered in their positions until 8 o'clock, despite the fact that no more shots could be heard on the opposite side of the town.

==== Retreat ====
When Burlaka noticed that the firing on the western side had fallen silent and the Poles had redeployed their forces toward him, he ordered a retreat. Securing his left flank, the chota - the "Zaliznyy" commander - deployed south of the manor was left alone, encircled by the counterattack described above in the direction of Valkova Mountain, ordered the retreat of his troops south into the forest toward Lomna. The retreat was conducted under HMG and mortar fire from Walkowa Mountain. Attempts were also made to cut off the unit's retreat south toward Wola Korzeniecka and Lomna, and destroy it in the open. The pursuit lasted for a distance of 3 kilometers, but the unit managed to reach the forest and, on the border of the forest, stopped the pursuit of a mounted WP company.

Chots 505 and 506 were unable to withstand the shelling and abandoned their positions, retreating toward Nowa Wieś at 5 a.m. Chot 504 left the battlefield at 6:30 a.m. The report makes no mention at all of the SB unit conducting combat. Presumably, it acted as gendarmerie, or was intended for police operations inside the village.

=== Casualties of the third attack ===
According to a Ukrainian report, 23 members of the Ukrainian Insurgent Army were killed in the battle (including "Konyk" and "Orski," some of the Banderites were wounded, they were killed the next morning), and 22 were wounded, including two seriously (they were taken to forest hospitals, Yuri Boreć, among others, was wounded in the battle). The same report estimates Polish losses at 70 killed and an unknown number of wounded. However, the course of events (attack on exposed terrain) indicates that these figures were treated as propaganda. Much closer to the truth are the figures given by Polish sources.

Polish sources state that the UPA suffered losses of 140 killed and 12 taken prisoner, while on the Polish side there were (according to Ginalski and Wysokinski) only nine wounded.

However, an exhumation undertaken in 1999 showed that there were 28 skeletons at the site indicated as the burial place of UPA members. The condition of some of the skeletons indicated that some of those wounded in the battle had been beaten to death, or killed by a shot to the head from a short distance. It was found that in addition to 23 UPA members, the grave contained the bodies of five civilians previously imprisoned in the local jail, were killed the next morning.

The third assault on Bircza resulted in a Polish success. Despite a determined assault by the Ukrainian Insurgent Army (UPA), the Polish defenders successfully repelled the attack, inflicting significant casualties on the UPA forces and maintaining control of key installations in the city. In addition, the UPA forces suffered heavy casualties, including the deaths of Mykhailo Galyo and Dmytro Karvanskyi.

== Aftermath ==
Out of the three UPA attacks on Bircza, only the third one ended in their defeat. As a result of the victory for Poland in the third attack, the UPA ceased their attacks on Bircza. Tomasz Kolanek describes the Polish victory in the third attack as "uncomfortable", due to the UPA's massacres on Poles continuing. It took the Polish People's Republic more than a year to liquidate the UPA on post-war Polish territory.
