= Korzeniec, Podkarpackie Voivodeship =

Korzeniec
- Village
- Location within Poland
- Coordinates: 49°43′N 22°31′E
- Country: Poland
- Voivodeship: Subcarpathian
- County: Przemyśl
- Gmina: Bircza

Korzeniec [kɔˈʐɛɲɛt͡s] is a village in the administrative district of Gmina Bircza, within Przemyśl County, Subcarpathian Voivodeship, in south-eastern Poland.
