= Kuźmina =

- Village
- Location within Poland
- Coordinates: 49°36′N 22°25′E
- Country: Poland
- Voivodeship: Subcarpathian
- County: Przemyśl
- Gmina: Bircza
- Population: 480

Kuźmina [kuʑˈmina] is a village in the administrative district of Gmina Bircza, within Przemyśl County, Subcarpathian Voivodeship, in south-eastern Poland.
