= Roztoka, Podkarpackie Voivodeship =

Roztoka
- Village
- Location within Poland
- Coordinates: 49°36′8″N 22°27′43″E
- Country: Poland
- Voivodeship: Subcarpathian
- County: Przemyśl
- Gmina: Bircza

Roztoka [rɔsˈtɔka] is a village in the administrative district of Gmina Bircza, within Przemyśl County, Subcarpathian Voivodeship, in south-eastern Poland.
