= Dobrzanka =

- Village
- Location within Poland
- Coordinates: 49°40′N 22°24′E
- Country: Poland
- Voivodeship: Subcarpathian
- County: Przemyśl
- Gmina: Bircza
- Population: 0

Dobrzanka [dɔˈbʐanka] is a former village in the administrative district of Gmina Bircza, within Przemyśl County, Subcarpathian Voivodeship, in south-eastern Poland.
