= Brzuska =

- Village
- Location within Poland
- Coordinates: 49°46′N 22°29′E
- Country: Poland
- Voivodeship: Subcarpathian
- County: Przemyśl
- Gmina: Bircza

Brzuska [ˈbʐuska] is a village in the administrative district of Gmina Bircza, within Przemyśl County, Subcarpathian Voivodeship, in south-eastern Poland.

== See also ==
- Historiography of the Volyn tragedy
- Operation Vistula
