= Podgórski sisters =

Polish Righteous Among the Nations

The Podgórska sisters, Stefania Podgórska (June 2, 1925 – September 29, 2018) and Helena Podgórska (1935 – December 5, 2022), came from a Catholic farming family living near Przemyśl in south-eastern Poland. During the Holocaust, sixteen-year-old Stefania and her seven-year-old sister harboured thirteen Jewish men, women and children in the attic of their home for two-and-a-half years. Both were later honored as the Righteous Among the Nations by Yad Vashem as well as by the Jewish and Polish organizations in North America, for their wartime heroism.

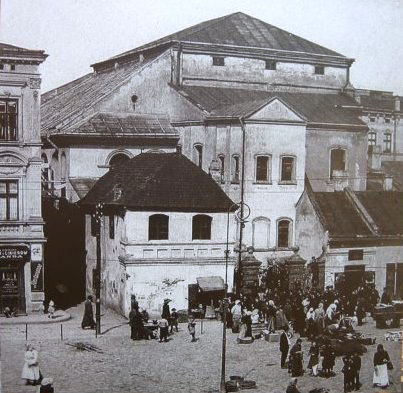
Prewar photograph showing worshipers in front of Przemyśl Old Synagogue

Before the 1939 invasion of Poland by Nazi Germany and the Soviet Union, Stefania Podgórska (Born June 2, 1925, in Lipa – Died September 29, 2018, in Los Angeles) worked in a grocery store owned by the Diamants, a Jewish family. Her father had died in 1938 after an illness. Soon after the arrival of the Nazis, her mother and brother were taken to Salzburg for forced labor, while the Diamants were forced into a ghetto. The two Podgórska sisters lived in Przemyśl alone in an apartment rented by Stefania, who was 17 at the time. She got a job in town as a machine-tool operator.

The border between the two invaders ran through the middle of Przemyśl until the German attack on the Soviet Union in June 1941. In 1942, the news spread about the Jewish ghetto in Przemysl being liquidated by the Nazis. Stefania's prewar employer's son, Max Diamant, appeared on their doorstep. He escaped with his brother and cousin from the train to Belzec extermination camp. The girls were terrified, but gave Max permission to hide in the attic. He contacted his family in the ghetto, and asked Stefania to accept them also, including his younger brother Henek and Henek's wife Danuta, Dr. William Shylenger and his daughter Judy, and a friend of his, a dentist with his son. In order to accommodate the fugitives, Stefania soon rented a semi-detached cottage with two rooms, a kitchen, and an attic on Tatarska Street.

== Life on Tatarska Street ==
Helena, with her sister Stefania, moved in first, followed by Max Diamant. Then came Dr. Schillinger with his daughter, and the dentist with his son. The dentist's friend, a widow from the ghetto came also with her son and daughter. She wrote a threatening note that she would denounce the girls if she was refused. The dentist begged Stefania to admit his nephew with his wife. Max's younger brother, Henek, with his wife arrived later, finally there came a Jewish mailman: thirteen Jews in total. Max made a wall in the attic from boards bought by Stefania, securing a sleeping quarter for everybody.

After a few weeks, they were completely without money. Stefania started to knit sweaters and take orders for them, from her friends and acquaintances. She was trading clothes for food and buying it, if necessary, on the black market. An SS man moved in next door. Max kept vigil with others to eliminate any noises. In early 1944, a German officer entered the apartment, and announced that Stefania and Helena must vacate the place in two hours. The Jewish fugitives begged the two sisters to flee as they felt that all of them were doomed. But Stefania, after praying to the Black Madonna of Częstochowa, thought otherwise. "I am not leaving you", she said. German nurses and their boyfriends lived underneath Stefania and her refugees for eight months. After these eight months, the nurses had to evacuate to follow the German army; the 13 Jewish residents had successfully stayed undetected.

On July 27, 1944, the Soviet Army entered Przemyśl. The thirteen Jews, though emaciated and weak, were free. Max, who took the name Josef Burzminski, proposed to Stefania (Fusia) and was accepted. In 1961, the couple emigrated to the United States, where Burzminski became a dentist. They have a son and daughter. Helena Podgórska remained in Poland, married, and became a physician in Wrocław. In 1979, the sisters were honored by Yad Vashem, in Jerusalem, as Righteous among the Nations.

Stefania died on September 29, 2018, at the age of 97 in Los Angeles, California. Helena died on December 5, 2022.

== In popular culture ==
A television movie which tells the sisters' story, called Hidden in Silence, was released in 1996. Directed by Richard A. Colla, with screenplay by Stephanie Liss, it featured Kellie Martin as Fusia (Stefania), Gemma Coughlan as Helena, and Tom Radcliffe as Max.

Author Sharon Cameron told their story in her 2020 Young Adult novel, The Light in Hidden Places. The book was Reese Witherspoon's YA Book Club Pick of Month in December 2020. Beata Pozniak, a Polish-American actress, director and long-time friend of Stefania Podgórska, brought Stefania's voice to life in the Scholastic audiobook version of The Light in Hidden Places, for which she received an Earphones Award for Best Narration.
