= Wola Korzeniecka =

- Village
- Location within Poland
- Coordinates: 49°42′N 22°30′E
- Country: Poland
- Voivodeship: Subcarpathian
- County: Przemyśl
- Gmina: Bircza

Wola Korzeniecka [ˈvɔla kɔʐɛˈɲɛt͡ska] is a village in the administrative district of Gmina Bircza, within Przemyśl County, Subcarpathian Voivodeship, in south-eastern Poland.
