= Nowa Wieś, Przemyśl County =

Nowa Wieś
- Village
- Location within Poland
- Coordinates: 49°42′41″N 22°28′35″E
- Country: Poland
- Voivodeship: Subcarpathian
- County: Przemyśl
- Gmina: Bircza

Nowa Wieś [ˈnɔva ˈvjɛɕ] is a village in the administrative district of Gmina Bircza, within Przemyśl County, Subcarpathian Voivodeship, in south-eastern Poland.
