= Lipa, Przemyśl County =

Lipa
- Village
- Location within Poland
- Coordinates: 49°43′N 22°23′E
- Country: Poland
- Voivodeship: Subcarpathian
- County: Przemyśl
- Gmina: Bircza

Lipa [ˈlipa] is a village in the administrative district of Gmina Bircza, within Przemyśl County, Subcarpathian Voivodeship, in south-eastern Poland.

The Podgórski sisters were born in Lipa.
