= Gmina Bircza =

Gmina Bircza Bircza Commune
- Gmina
- Coat of arms
- Interactive map of Gmina Bircza
- Coordinates (Bircza): 49°41′32″N 22°28′46″E
- Country: Poland
- Voivodeship: Subcarpathian
- County: Przemyśl County
- Seat: Bircza

Area
  - Total: 254.49 km^{2} (98.26 sq mi)

Population (2013)
  - Total: 6,746
  - Density: 26.51/km^{2} (68.66/sq mi)
- Website: http://www.bircza.pl/

Gmina Bircza is a rural gmina (administrative district) in Przemyśl County, Subcarpathian Voivodeship, in south-eastern Poland. Its seat is the village of Bircza, which lies approximately 24 kilometres (15 mi) south-west of Przemyśl and 51 km (32 mi) south-east of the regional capital Rzeszów.

The gmina covers an area of 254.49 square kilometres (98.3 sq mi), and as of 2006 its total population is 6,602 (6,746 in 2013).

== Neighbouring gminas ==
Gmina Bircza is bordered by the gminas of Dubiecko, Dydnia, Dynów, Fredropol, Krasiczyn, Krzywcza, Nozdrzec, Olszanica, Sanok, Tyrawa Wołoska and Ustrzyki Dolne.

== Villages ==
Gmina Bircza contains the following villages:

- Bircza
- Boguszówka
- Borownica
- Brzeżawa
- Brzuska
- Dobrzanka
- Huta Brzuska
- Jasienica Sufczyńska
- Jawornik Ruski
- Korzeniec
- Kotów
- Krajna
- Kuźmina
- Leszczawa Dolna
- Leszczawa Górna
- Leszczawka
- Lipa
- Łodzinka Dolna
- Łodzinka Górna
- Łomna
- Malawa
- Nowa Wieś
- Roztoka
- Rudawka
- Stara Bircza
- Sufczyna
- Wola Korzeniecka
- Żohatyn
