= Łodzinka Górna =

- Village
- Location within Poland
- Coordinates: 49°41′N 22°32′E
- Country: Poland
- Voivodeship: Subcarpathian
- County: Przemyśl
- Gmina: Bircza
- Population: 141

Łodzinka Górna [wɔˈd͡ʑiŋka ˈɡurna] is a village in the administrative district of Gmina Bircza, within Przemyśl County, Subcarpathian Voivodeship, in south-eastern Poland.
