= Malawa, Przemyśl County =

Malawa
- Village
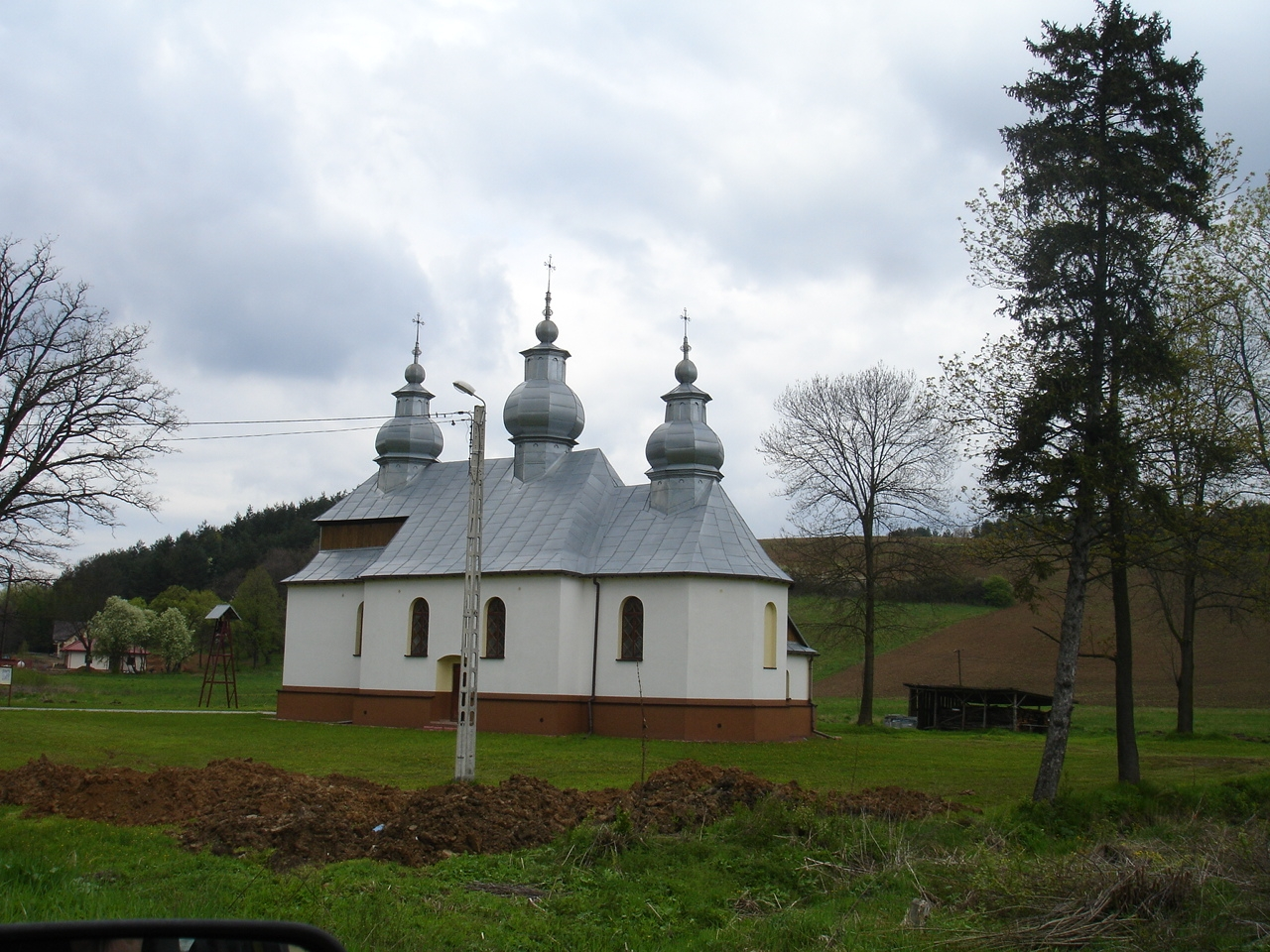
- Greek Catholic church

- Location within Poland
- Coordinates: 49°41′N 22°25′E
- Country: Poland
- Voivodeship: Subcarpathian
- County: Przemyśl
- Gmina: Bircza

Malawa [maˈlava] is a village in the administrative district of Gmina Bircza, within Przemyśl County, Subcarpathian Voivodeship, in south-eastern Poland.
