= Łomna, Podkarpackie Voivodeship =

Łomna
- Village
- Location within Poland
- Coordinates: 49°38′N 22°31′E
- Country: Poland
- Voivodeship: Subcarpathian
- County: Przemyśl
- Gmina: Bircza

Łomna [ˈwɔmna] is a former village in the administrative district of Gmina Bircza, within Przemyśl County, Subcarpathian Voivodeship, in south-eastern Poland.
