= Jawornik Ruski =

- Village
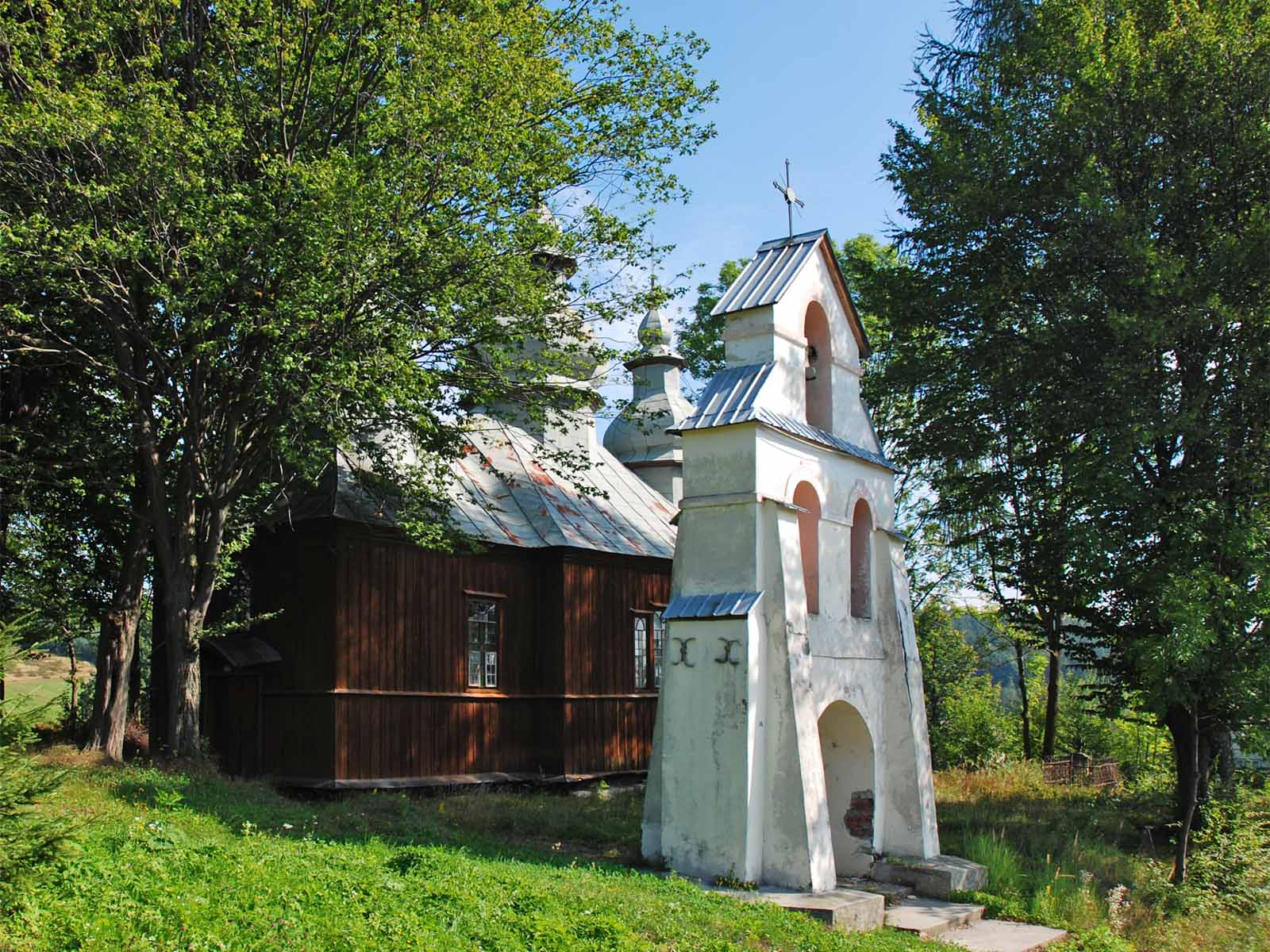
- Greek Catholic church

- Location within Poland
- Coordinates: 49°43′N 22°18′E
- Country: Poland
- Voivodeship: Subcarpathian
- County: Przemyśl
- Gmina: Bircza
- Population: 161

Jawornik Ruski [jaˈvɔrnik ˈruski] is a village in the administrative district of Gmina Bircza, within Przemyśl County, Subcarpathian Voivodeship, in south-eastern Poland.

Ukrainian priest and composer Mykhailo Verbytsky was born in the village.
