= Rudawka, Podkarpackie Voivodeship =

Rudawka
- Village
- Location within Poland
- Coordinates: 49°42′20″N 22°26′54″E
- Country: Poland
- Voivodeship: Subcarpathian
- County: Przemyśl
- Gmina: Bircza

Rudawka [ruˈdafka] is a village in the administrative district of Gmina Bircza, within Przemyśl County, Subcarpathian Voivodeship, in south-eastern Poland.
