= Leszczawa Górna =

- Village
- Location within Poland
- Coordinates: 49°39′N 22°27′E
- Country: Poland
- Voivodeship: Subcarpathian
- County: Przemyśl
- Gmina: Bircza

Leszczawa Górna [lɛʂˈt͡ʂava ˈɡurna] is a village in the administrative district of Gmina Bircza, within Przemyśl County, Subcarpathian Voivodeship, in south-eastern Poland.
