= Krajna, Gmina Bircza =

Krajna
- Village
- Location within Poland
- Coordinates: 49°40′N 22°32′E
- Country: Poland
- Voivodeship: Subcarpathian
- County: Przemyśl
- Gmina: Bircza
- Population: 0

Krajna [ˈkrai̯na] is a former village in the administrative district of Gmina Bircza, within Przemyśl County, Subcarpathian Voivodeship, in south-eastern Poland.

Arłamów Airport is located near the village.
