= Leszczawa Dolna =

- Village
- Location within Poland
- Coordinates: 49°39′19″N 22°26′26″E
- Country: Poland
- Voivodeship: Subcarpathian
- County: Przemyśl
- Gmina: Bircza
- Population: 860

Leszczawa Dolna [lɛʂˈt͡ʂava ˈdɔlna] is a village in the administrative district of Gmina Bircza, within Przemyśl County, Subcarpathian Voivodeship, in south-eastern Poland.
