= Bircza =

- Town
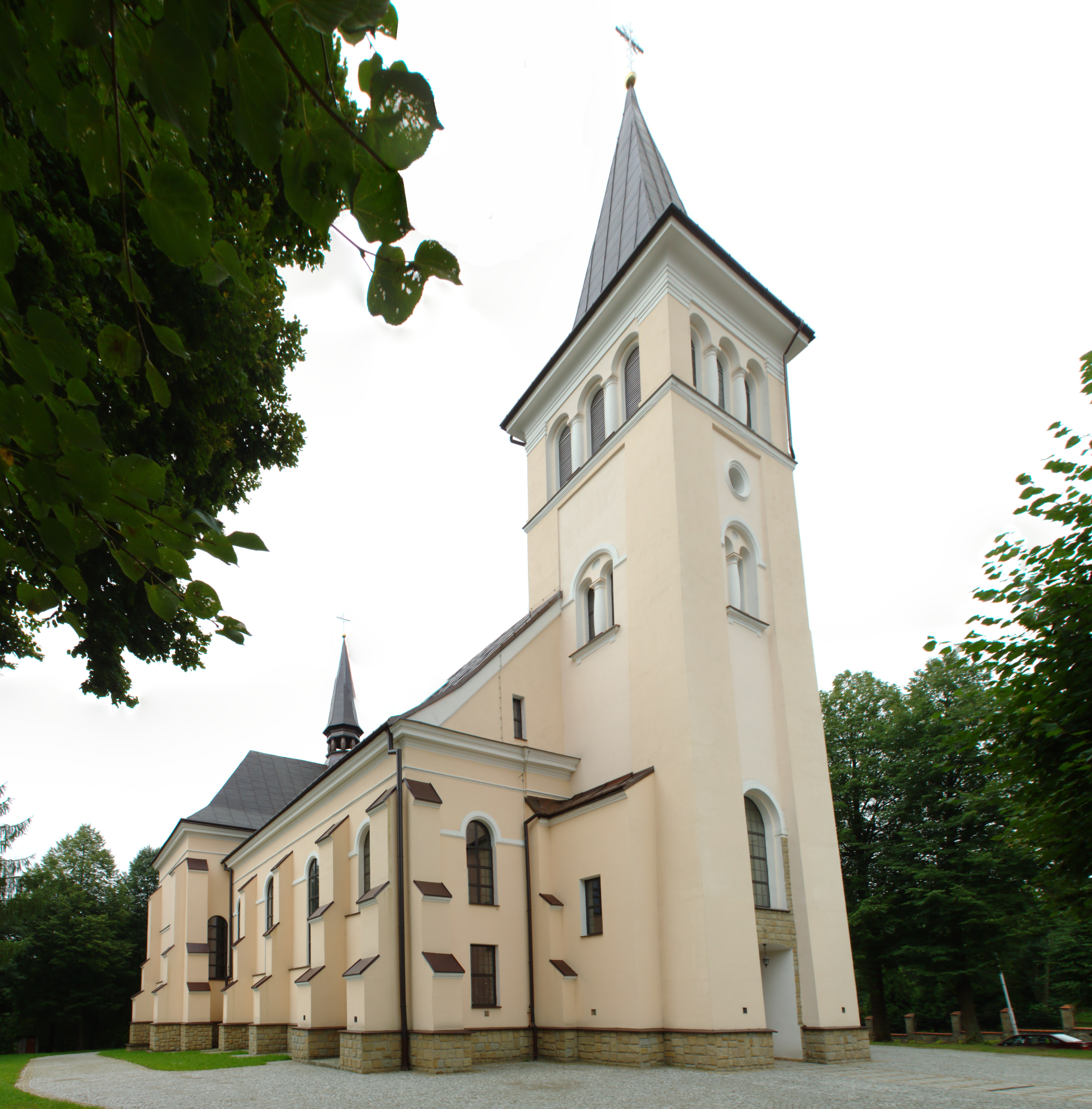
- Saint Stanislaus Kostka church in Bircza

- Coat of arms

- Location within Poland
- Coordinates: 49°41′32″N 22°28′46″E
- Country: Poland
- Voivodeship: Subcarpathian
- County: Przemyśl
- Gmina: Bircza
- Town rights: 1464

Population
  - Total: 1,000
- Time zone: UTC+1 (CET)
  - Summer (DST): UTC+2 (CEST)
- Vehicle registration: RPR
- Website: http://www.Bircza.pl

Bircza ([ˈbirt͡ʂa]) is a town in Przemyśl County, Subcarpathian Voivodeship, in south-eastern Poland. It is the seat of the gmina (administrative district) called Gmina Bircza.

== History ==
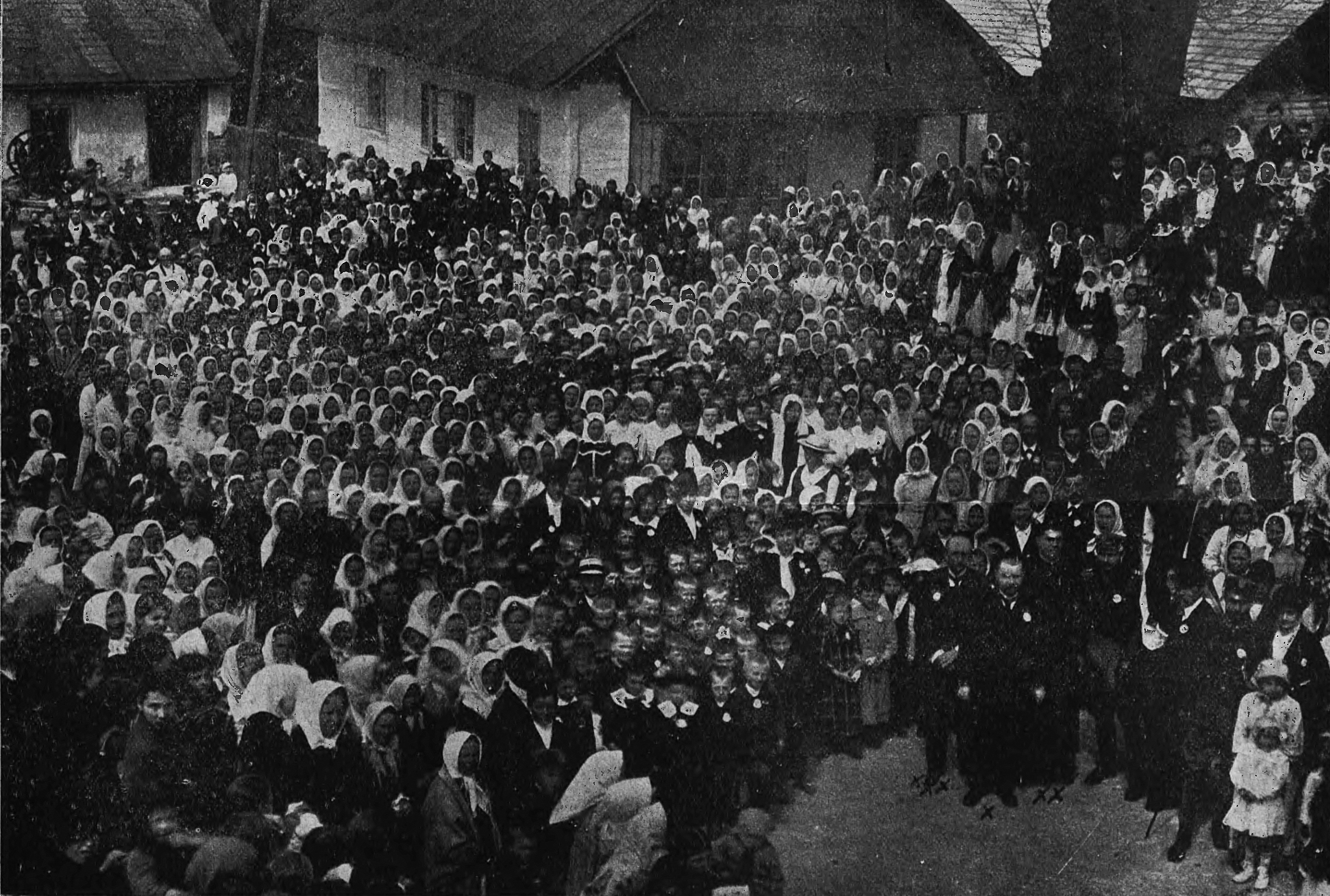
3 May Constitution anniversary in Bircza in 1917

Bircza was granted town rights in 1464. In 1876 the county seat was moved from Bircza to Dobromil.

Following the German-Soviet invasion of Poland, which started World War II in September 1939, the town was occupied by the Soviet Union until 1941 and then by Germany until 1944. Several Poles, who were either born or lived in Bircza, were murdered by the Russians in the Katyn massacre in 1940.

Three Battles of Bircza took place between Ukrainian Insurgent Army and the Polish communist forces in 1945 and 1946. The Poles won successfully defending the Polish occupation.

Bircza in 1950

=== Jewish community of Bircza ===
The earliest records of Jewish settlement in the area are from the 16th century. In the 19th century, the Jewish community grew to become about half the total size of area's residents. Initially, the community was part of the Dobromyl community, but by the second half of the 19th century, it became independent. Most of the Jews in Bircza belonged to Dynów Hassidism, but a minority followed the Sadigura rabbis.

During the conquest of the area by the Russian Empire in the First World War, Cossacks carried out attacks on the Jewish residents, including acts of robbery, rape, and murder. Many local Jews fled to escape the violence and, In between the wars, large numbers of the community's Jews emigrated, many to the United States. In the 1920s and 1930s, Zionist activity in Bircza increased, particularly in the form of youth groups affiliated with Beitar and ha-Noʿar ha-Tsiyyoni, ha-Shomer ha-Tsaʿir, and Aḥvah. During these years, the Jewish community numbered around 1,040 residents out of a total population of 1,930.

Following the outbreak of the Second World War, Bircza and its environs were part of Polish territory under Soviet occupation, but in June 1941, the Nazi Germans invaded and placed local control in the hands of the Ukrainian Auxiliary Police, which quickly killed sixteen Jewish community notables.

Soon, various restrictions were placed upon the Jews of Bircza and its surrounding villages, including the requirement of wearing a yellow star of David and participating in forced labour, and much Jewish property was looted. Additionally, a Judenrat was established and commanded to transfer ransom payments, valuables, and furs to the Germans.

In July 1942, the German police carried out a violent operation in which the Jews of the surrounding villages were brought to the market square and forced to bend on their knees for hours. A ghetto was established in the town, as all of Bircza's neighbouring villages were emptied of their Jewish population. Most of the Jews of Bircza were murdered in two operations, one on Kamienna Górka (‘Stony Hill’) and a further 800 Jews in 1942 on Górze Wierzysko (Wierzysko Hill). Afterwards, the remaining Jews were marched thirty kilometres on foot to the ghetto of Przemyśl, from where they were transferred later to the Belzec extermination camp. One Polish family (Michał and Katarzyna Gierula) from the nearby village of Łodzinka Górna sheltered seven Jews in their barn, but after local residents discovered this, the German authorities killed the adults and their neighbour and the three remaining Jews on 1 January 1944. Their sacrifice was later recognised by Yad Vashem.

A cross was set up on Kamienna Górka and, in 2018, following an effort by Bircza high school students, a sign was placed at the location of the second (and larger) killing site on Górze Wierzysko. Following the Second World War, a Union of Bircza Survivors was active for some decades in Israel. In July 2024, the last Holocaust survivor from Bircza and final remaining Jew born in Bircza (who lived in Herzliyyah, Israel) died, bringing an end to five centuries of Jewish life in Bircza.

== Demographics ==
Historical population
Year	Pop.	±%
1869	1,196	—
1880	1,294	+8.2%
1890	1,800	+39.1%
1900	2,071	+15.1%
1910	2,156	+4.1%
