= Jadwiga Grabowska-Hawrylak =

Polish architect (1920–2018)

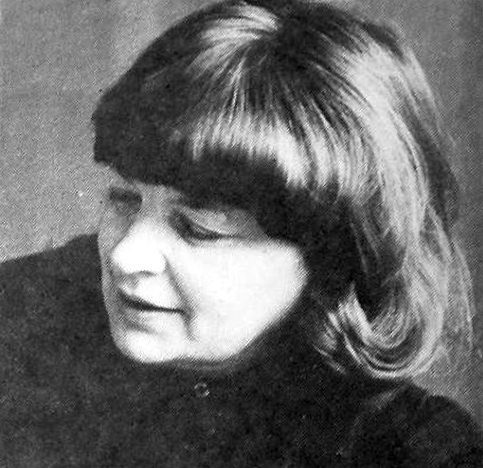
- Jadwiga Grabowska-Hawrylak in 1974
- Born: Jadwiga Grabowska; 29 October 1920; Tarnawce, Second Polish Republic
- Died: 4 June 2018 (aged 97); Wrocław, Third Polish Republic
- Education: Wrocław University of Technology
- Occupation: Architect
- Buildings: Scientist's House (1957); Grunwald Square Housing Estate (1967–1975); Church of Christ the Redeemer of the World (1996)
- Projects: Manhattan Estate

Jadwiga Grabowska-Hawrylak (born October 29, 1920 – died June 4, 2018) was a Polish architect active between 1954 and 1993. She is known for designing housing and schools, and for her contributions to the post-WWII reconstruction of Wrocław.

== Life ==
Grabowska-Hawrylak was born in the village of Tarnawce in Eastern Galicia. She grew up in Przemyśl, in southeastern Poland, as the daughter of two teachers. She graduated from high school in 1939.

In 1945, after World War II, she moved to Wrocław. The city had been within German borders since 1740, but was returned to Poland after the war, when 60% of it was in ruins. Rebuilding the city was secondary to rebuilding the more thoroughly destroyed capital of Warsaw, and did not begin until 1952.

In 1950, Grabowska-Hawrylak graduated from the Wrocław University of Technology, after having completed a thesis on interior design. Her first professional work was a historic reconstruction of Burgher houses in Wrocław's market square. She joined Miastoproject-Wrocław, the government-operated architectural group for the city, and worked on residential projects in the city centre. Her work – especially "Manhattan", the residential estate at Plac Grunwaldzki, perhaps her best-known project – became emblematic of brutalism, but unintentionally so: her planned white balconies filled with greenery were built with grey concrete and left unpainted. The estate went through a full renovation in 2015, which saw the building painted in the planned, white colours.

Her unbuilt works include a tourist centre in Como, Italy, residential development in Manila, the Philippines, and a New Urbanist housing estate in Oleśnica, in southwestern Poland.

After decades in architecture, she began quilting in the 1980s. Her last project was the postmodern Millennium Memorial Church of the Diocese of Wrocław, built in 1996.

== Awards and legacy ==
Grabowska-Hawrylak was the first female graduate in Wrocław after World War II. In 1974, she became the first woman to be awarded the Honorary Award of the Association of Polish Architects (SARP), the most prestigious architectural award in the country. In 1972, she received the Gold Cross of Merit and in 1989 the Commander's Cross of the Order of Polonia Restituta.

The American Institute of Architects' Center for Architecture hosted a retrospective exhibition titled "Patchwork: The Architecture of Jadwiga Grabowska-Hawrylak" in 2019.

== Personal life ==
Her husband was Henryk Hawrylak, a mining machinery specialist. She had three children: Katarzyna, Maciej, and Paweł.

== Notable works ==
Name	Location	Years(s)	Description	Photo
Scientist's House (Dom Naukowca)	Wrocław	1957	Ten-storey residential building built to house affiliates of Wrocław universities; the first modernist building in the city; designed as part of the Miastoproject group	
Maisonette House(Mezonetowiec)	Wrocław	1958–1960	On Kołłątaja Street; nine storeys, with ground floor retail with duplex apartments on floors above; registered as a protected historic monument in 2017, renovated in 2022.	
Plac Grunwaldzki housing estate	Wrocław	1967-1972	Six 16-storey residential buildings built in the centre of Wrocław, near the Grunwaldzki Bridge; buildings are linked with commercial pavilions; entire complex is built on a platform above parking infrastructure; nicknamed "Manhattan" or "Sedesowce" (toilet seat buildings) due to the distinctive, rounded shape of balconies	
Church of Christ the Redeemer of the World (Kościół Chrystusa Odkupiciela Świata)	Wrocław	1996	On Bałtycka Street; an active Catholic church designed in part for the Millennial of the Diocese of Wrocław	

== See also ==
- Architecture of Poland
- List of Polish architects
