= Battle of Boratycze =

- Part of Invasion of Poland
| Date | September 14, 1939 |
| Location | Boratycze, Poland |

Belligerents
| Poland | Germany |

Commanders and leaders
| Kazimierz Fabrycy | |

The Battle of Boratycze took place on September 14, 1939, during the Invasion of Poland. Polish 24th Infantry Division, commanded by General Kazimierz Fabrycy, and supported by units of Border Protection Corps, clashed with German 2nd Mountain Division. The battle took place near the village of Boratycze, located between Przemysl and Lwów in the Second Polish Republic (now Lviv in Ukraine).

On September 11–12, 1939, Polish 24th Infantry, commanded by Colonel Alfred Krajewski, fought a bloody battle with advancing 2nd Mountain Division near Bircza. The Poles suffered heavy losses, and on September 12 in the evening, the Germans broke through Polish positions, forcing their enemy to retreat towards Olszany and Rokszyce. General Kazimierz Sosnkowski, who commanded Polish Southern Front, ordered General Fabrycy to march with his forces towards Lwow. 24th Division was to retreat behind the San river, but as a result of this, southern wing of the defence of Przemysl was uncovered. On September 14, all units defending Przemysl were withdrawn from the city (see Battle of Przemysl (1939)).

On September 14, near Boratycze, 1st Battalion of 39th Polish Infantry Regiment attacked a reconnaissance unit of the 2nd Mountain Division, and forced it to retreat. By midday, Polish division concentrated near Tyszkowice, together with its artillery, 155th Infantry Regiment and remnants of Battalion Zytyn of the Border Protection Corps (KOP). Near Popowice, 38th Lwow Rifles Infantry Regiment was concentrated, together with 1st KOP Karpaty Infantry Regiment, while near Chodnowice, 39th Infantry Regiment was located. All Polish units were attacked by the Luftwaffe.

With airforce support, German 2nd Mountain Infantry entered the battle. Most of it was concentrated at Boratycze, but after initial success, the Poles counterattacked, forcing the Germans to halt. Fighting took place in local forests, and losses of both sides were extremely high. In the evening of September 14, Polish 24th Infantry was ordered by General Sosnkowski to detach itself from the enemy, and march eastwards.

In the morning of the next day, Polish division was in the area of Mostyska. Since it was impossible to march towards Lwow via Grodek Jagiellonski, General Sosnkowski ordered it to march northeast, to Janow Forest, and then to Lwow.

The Battle of Boratycze is commemorated on the Tomb of the Unknown Soldier, Warsaw, with the inscription "BORATYCZE 14 IX 1939".

== Sources ==
- Krzysztof Komorowski [red.]: Boje Polskie 1939 – 1945. Warszawa: Bellona Spółka Akcyjna, 2009, s. 49–50.
