= Moriz Benedikt =

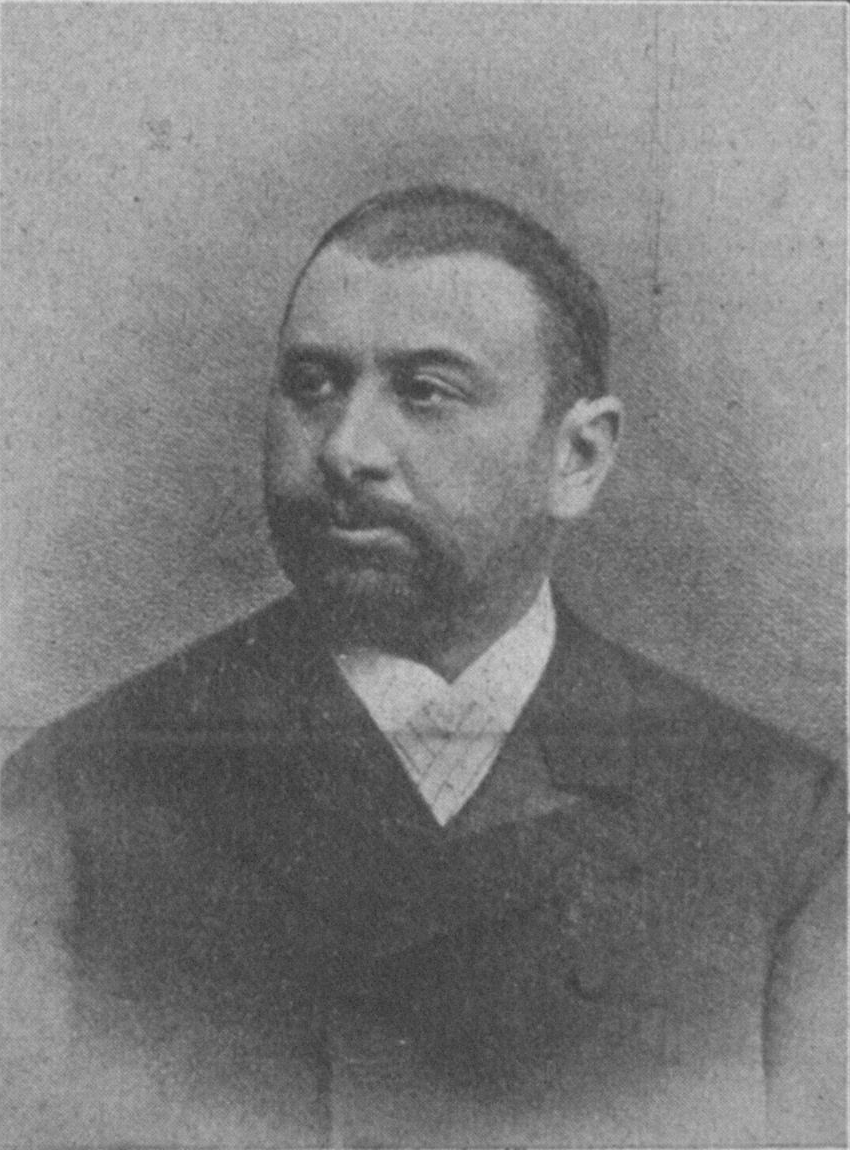
Moriz Benedikt

Moriz Benedikt (sometimes spelled Moritz) (27 May 1849 – 18 March 1920), was a long-time editor of the Neue Freie Presse and a powerful figure in Austrian politics and society.

Raised in a Jewish family in Krasice, he was the magazine's subeditor from 1872 to 1880, then associate editor and editor-in-chief from 1908 to the day he died.

The satirist Karl Kraus was a persistent critic of Benedikt ("the Lord of all Hyenas") and his paper, i.a., for their aggressive militaristic stance in the wake of World War I.

He died in Vienna.
