= Korytniki =

- Village
- Location within Poland
- Coordinates: 49°47′N 22°39′E
- Country: Poland
- Voivodeship: Subcarpathian
- County: Przemyśl
- Gmina: Krasiczyn
- Elevation: 150 m (490 ft)
- Population: 640

Korytniki [kɔrɨtˈniki] is a village in the administrative district of Gmina Krasiczyn, within Przemyśl County, Subcarpathian Voivodeship, in south-eastern Poland.
