= Manhattan Estate =

Manhattan estate
- Residential and commercial complex at Grunwaldzki Square
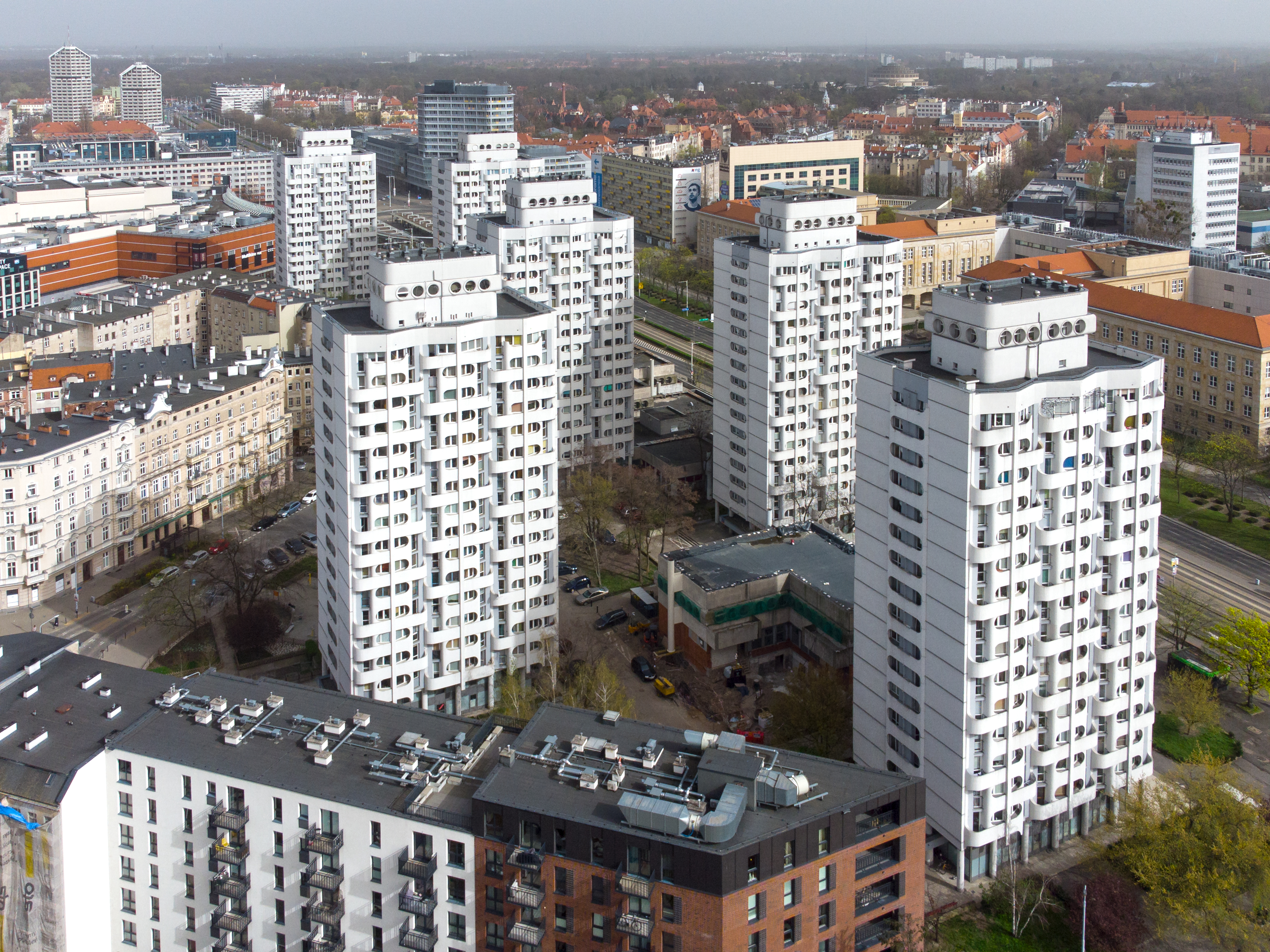
- Aerial view of the residential complex consisting of six blocks from the northwest.

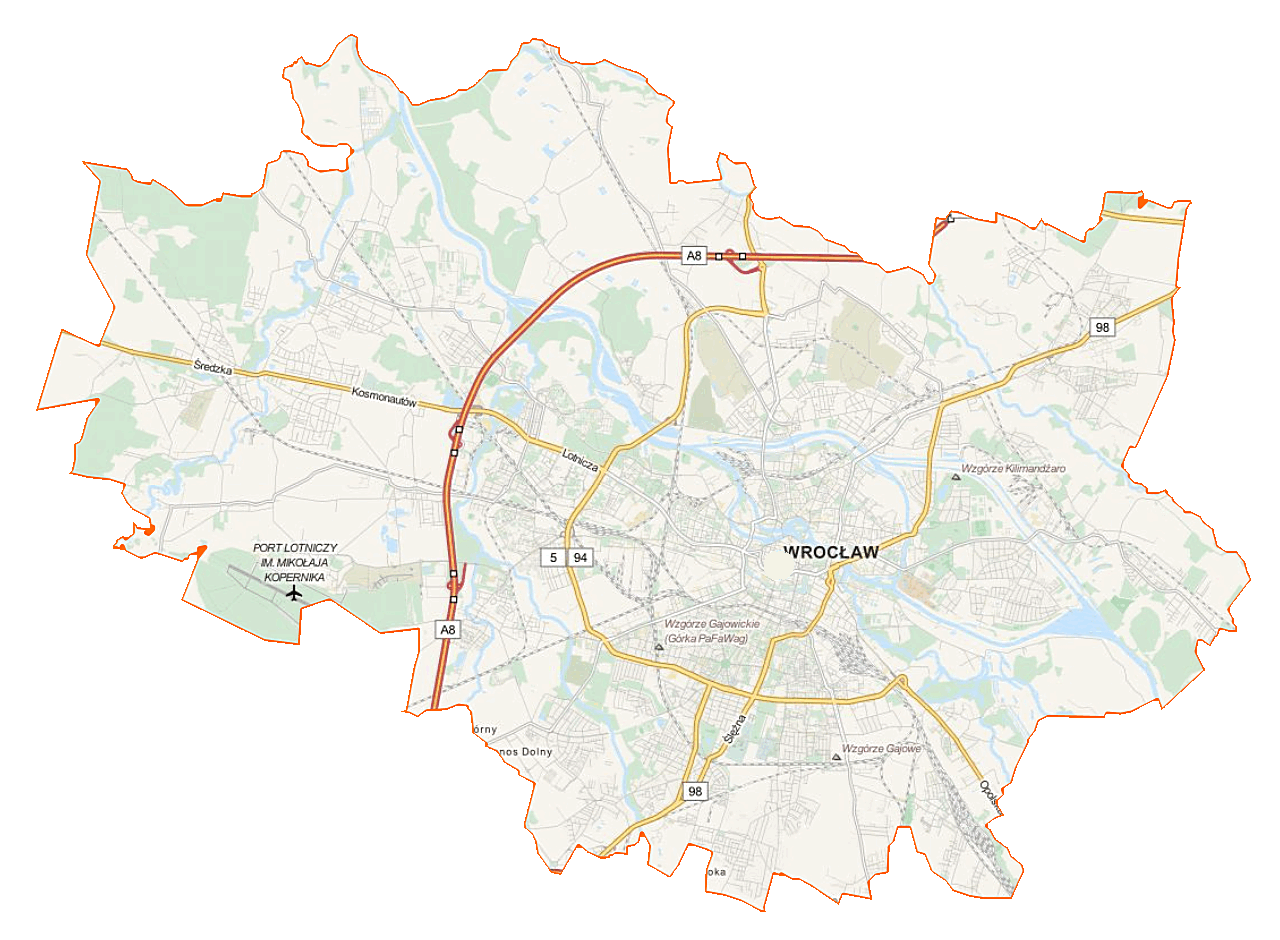
- Location within Wrocław

General information
- Architectural style: Brutalism
- Location: plac Grunwaldzki 4-20, Curie-Skłodowskiej 15, Wrocław, Poland
- Coordinates: 51°06′37″N 17°03′14″E
- Construction started: 1970
- Completed: 1973

Height
- Height: 54 m

Design and construction
- Architect: Jadwiga Grabowska-Hawrylak

The Manhattan Estate in Wrocław is a residential and commercial complex located at Grunwaldzki Square (pl. Grunwaldzki 4–20) and 15 Maria Skłodowska-Curie Street. The development consists of six residential buildings and three commercial pavilions. Designed between 1967 and 1970 by architect Jadwiga Grabowska-Hawrylak, the estate was constructed between 1970 and 1973 by the Wrocław General Construction Enterprise. The residential buildings were completed and opened for use between 1976 and 1978. Locally, the complex is often referred to as Wrocław's Manhattan, Bunkrowce (Bunkers), or Sedesowce (Toilet Bowls) due to its distinctive architectural style.

== History ==
The complex consists of six high-rise residential buildings, each standing 55 meters tall (16 floors), along with commercial pavilions, which are elevated above the ground on reinforced concrete pillars. The original design envisioned white concrete towers with exotic wood finishes on the balconies, climbing plants in the rounded recesses of the façade, and grass-covered roofs on the commercial pavilions. According to architect Jadwiga Grabowska-Hawrylak, the design aimed to evoke a Mediterranean atmosphere. The buildings were constructed on a concrete platform, with the ground reinforced by 240 pillars.

During construction, the project was scaled down to reduce costs, resulting in the use of lower-quality building materials. This was facilitated by the transfer of the project from the city to a housing cooperative. The original design included windows in the stairwells, but these were omitted to accommodate a higher number of smaller rooms per building, leaving the stairwells dark. In another cost-saving measure, the exterior façades were left unfinished. Before renovation, exposed concrete with protruding iron rods and paint stains from the construction phase remained visible.

Despite budget constraints, Grabowska-Hawrylak managed to implement rooftop terraces with communal areas and bathrooms on the flat roofs of all residential buildings in Grunwaldzki Square. She described these terraces, designed to include greenery and sanitary facilities, as a way to "compensate for the lack of recreational areas" within the estate. The balconies were clad in clinker brick, and the buildings were constructed using prefabricated concrete elements with an unconventional, "streamlined architectural form". The architect also deliberately chose a dark shade for the window frames instead of the typical white oil paint used at the time, believing it complemented the sculptural appearance of the façade better.

All buildings were initially planned to be constructed with high-quality white concrete. However, due to cost-cutting measures, the final structures were built using the cheapest available gray concrete. After nearly half a century, the original vision was revisited during a 2015 renovation, when all residential buildings were plastered and painted white. Following the renovation, only one of the six residential buildings was fitted with original round windows with circular glass panes, replacing the long-criticized empty round concrete openings that had collected moisture and dirt for years.

In 1973, director Janusz Kondratiuk filmed the television movie Pies (The Dog) on-site, depicting the estate under construction. The following year, the film Karuzela (Carousel) was produced there.

The Grunwaldzki Square complex is listed as a historic monument in the Lower Silesian Voivodeship's heritage register.

== Images ==
=== Architecture ===
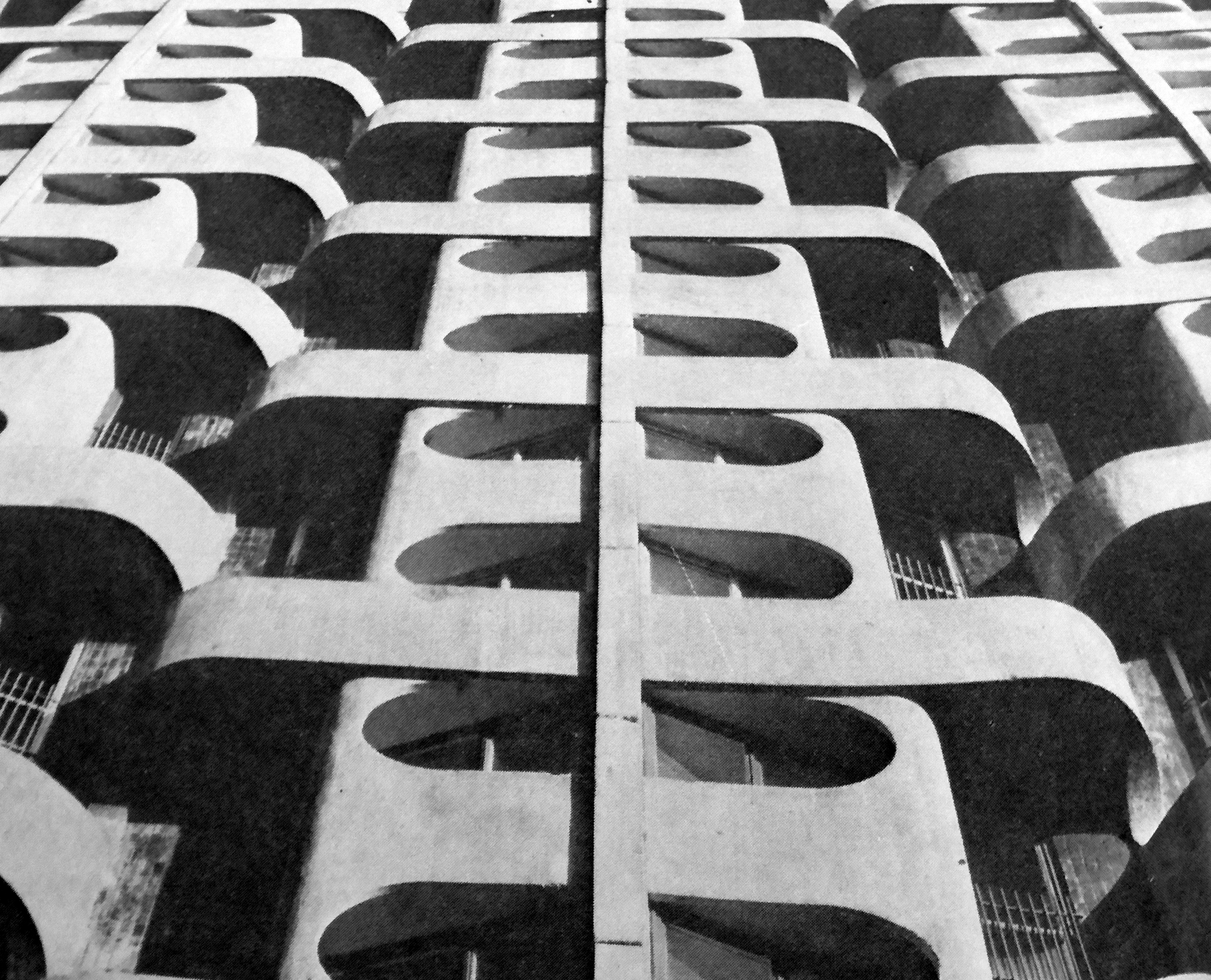
Façade of one of the high-rises shortly after construction, 1977

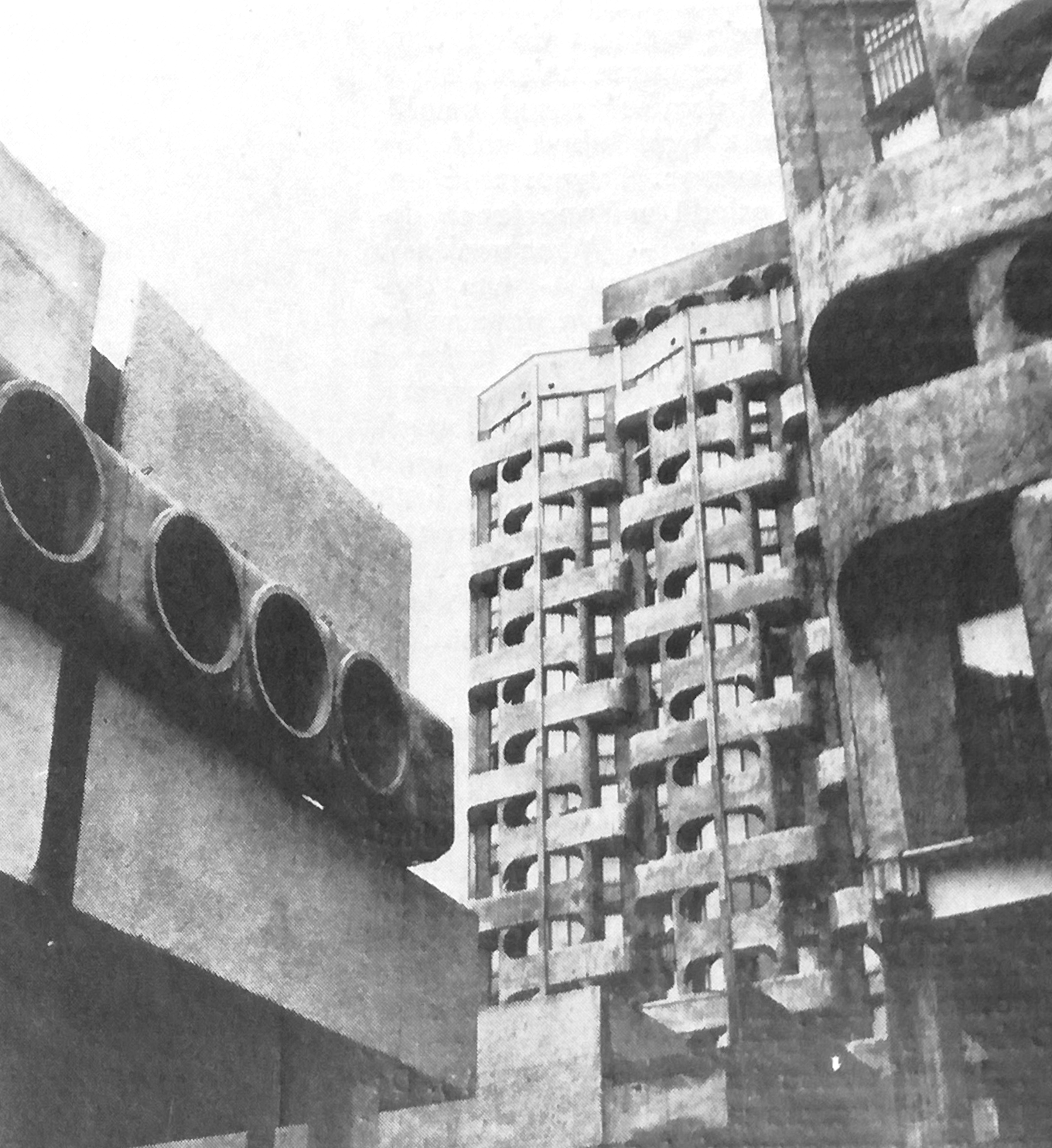
High-rise and ground-level pavilions, 1977

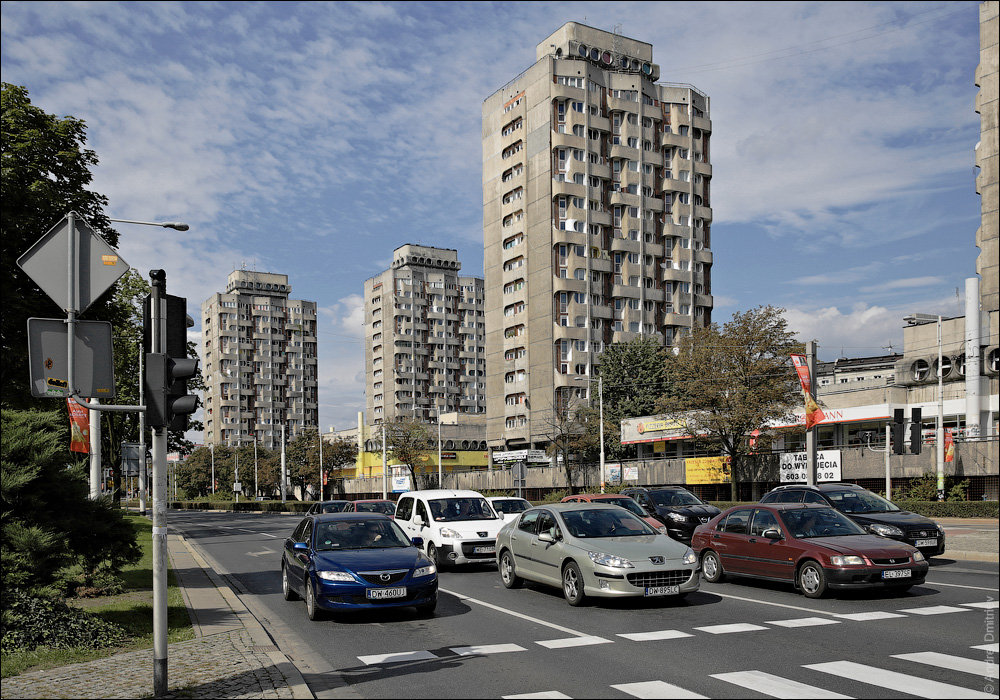
The complex before renovation, viewed from Grunwaldzki Square, 2014

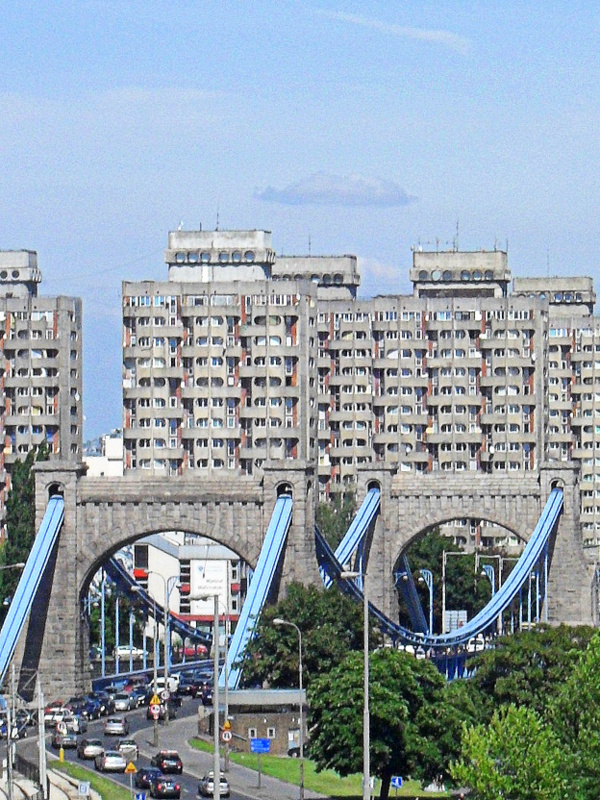
The complex before renovation, viewed from the Grunwaldzki Bridge, 2011

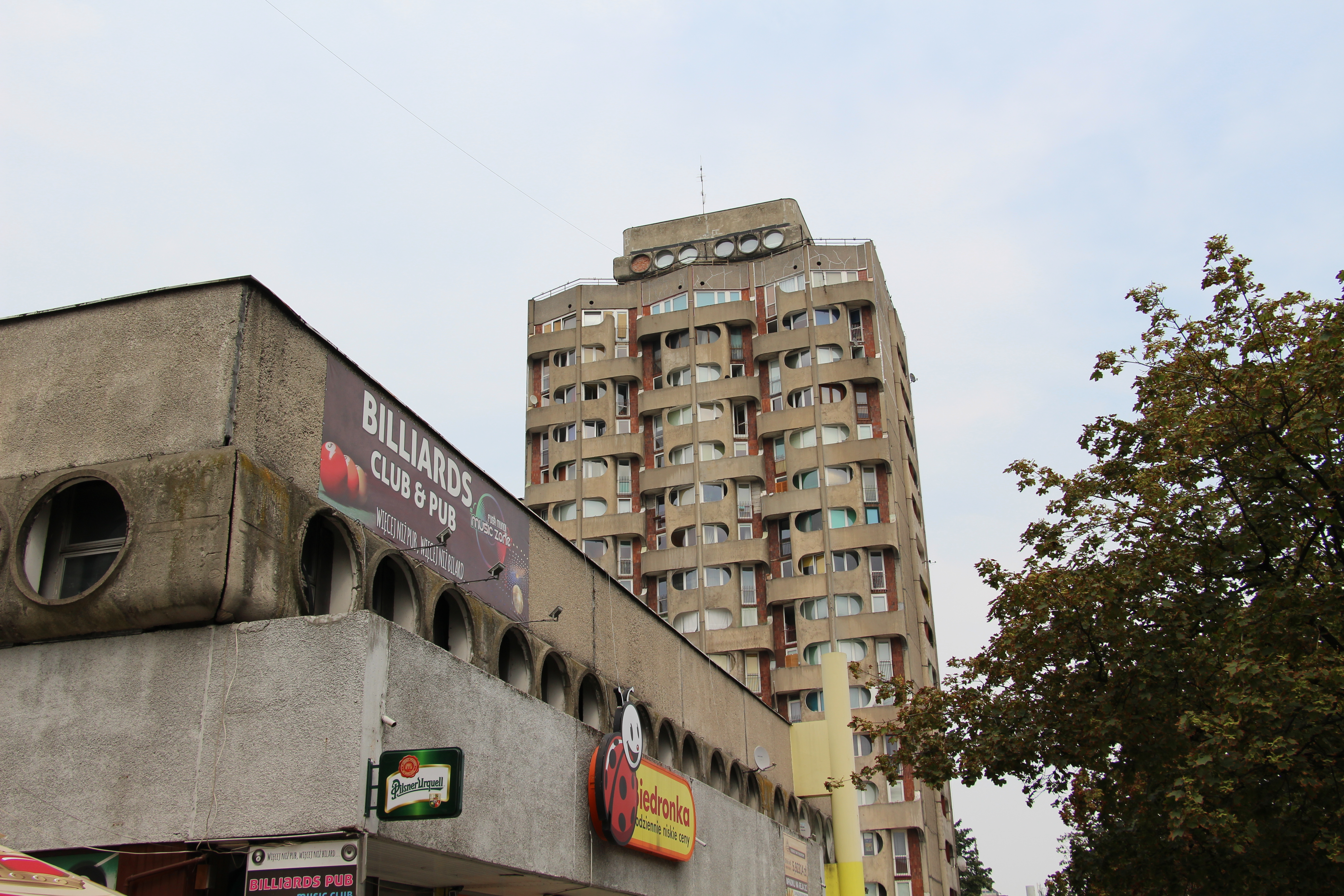
Façades of the complex in 2015, showing the characteristic combination of brick and concrete on the façade

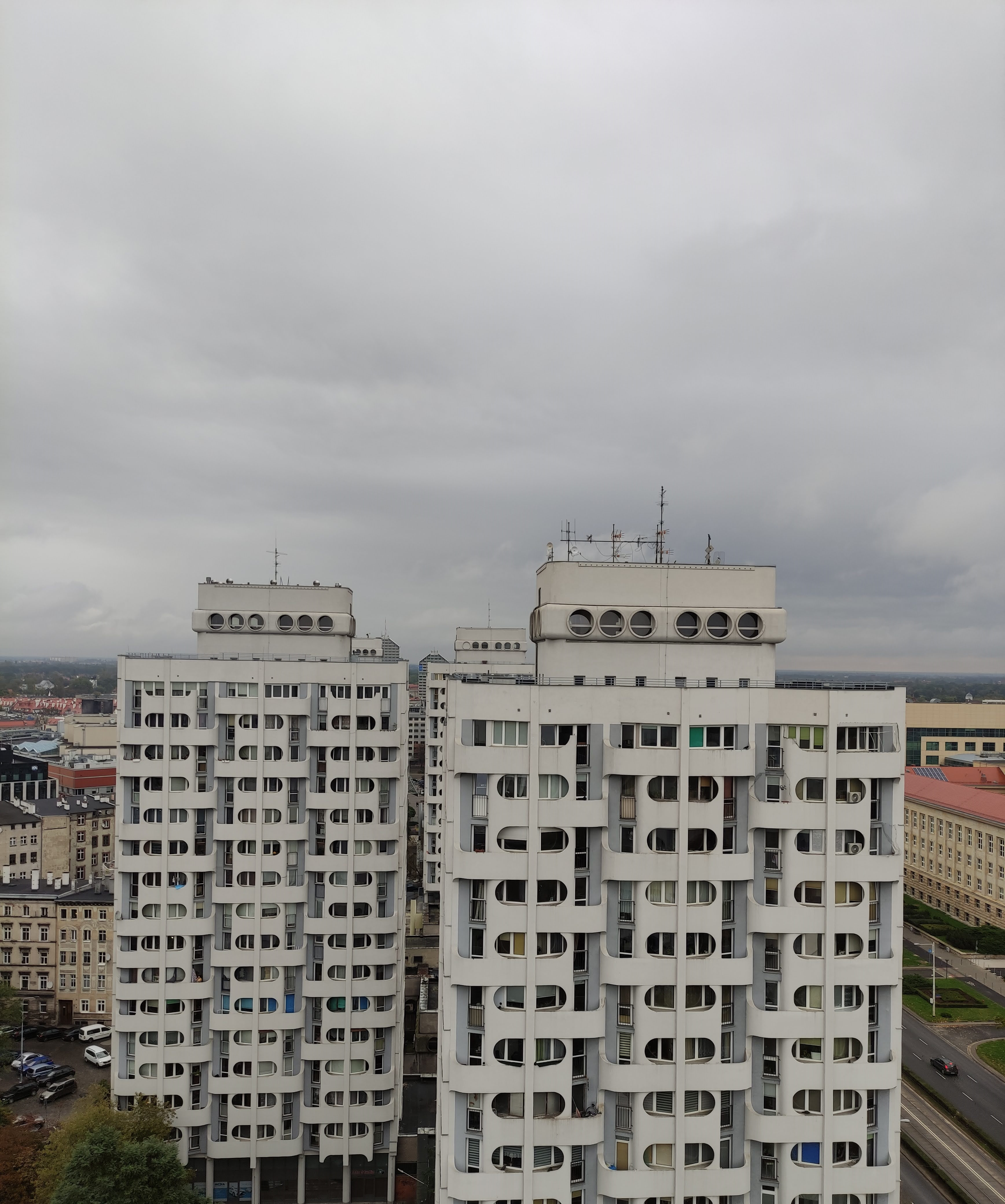
Renovated high-rises of the complex in 2020, without brick, with the concrete painted white

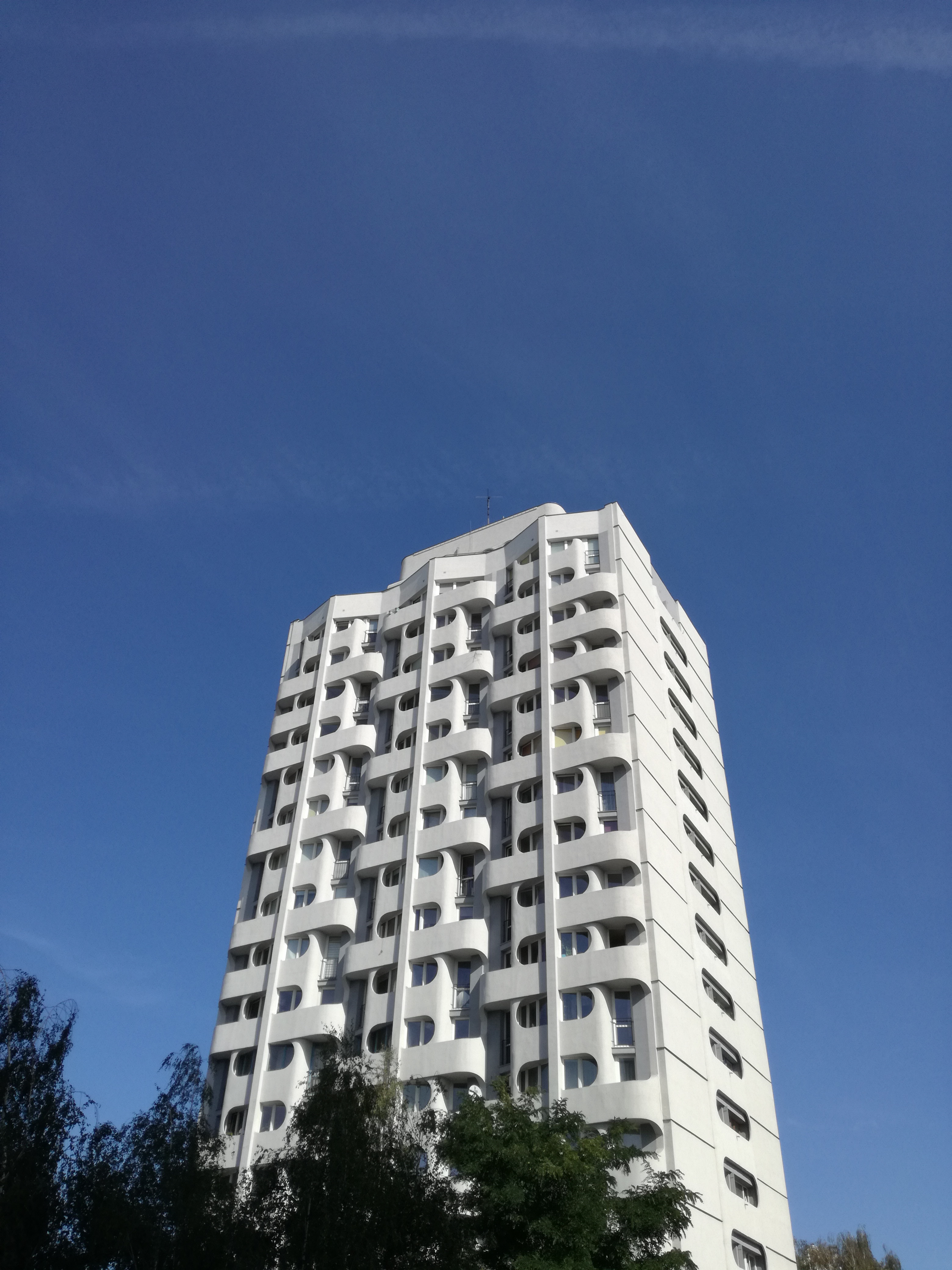
One of the high-rises with a renovated façade

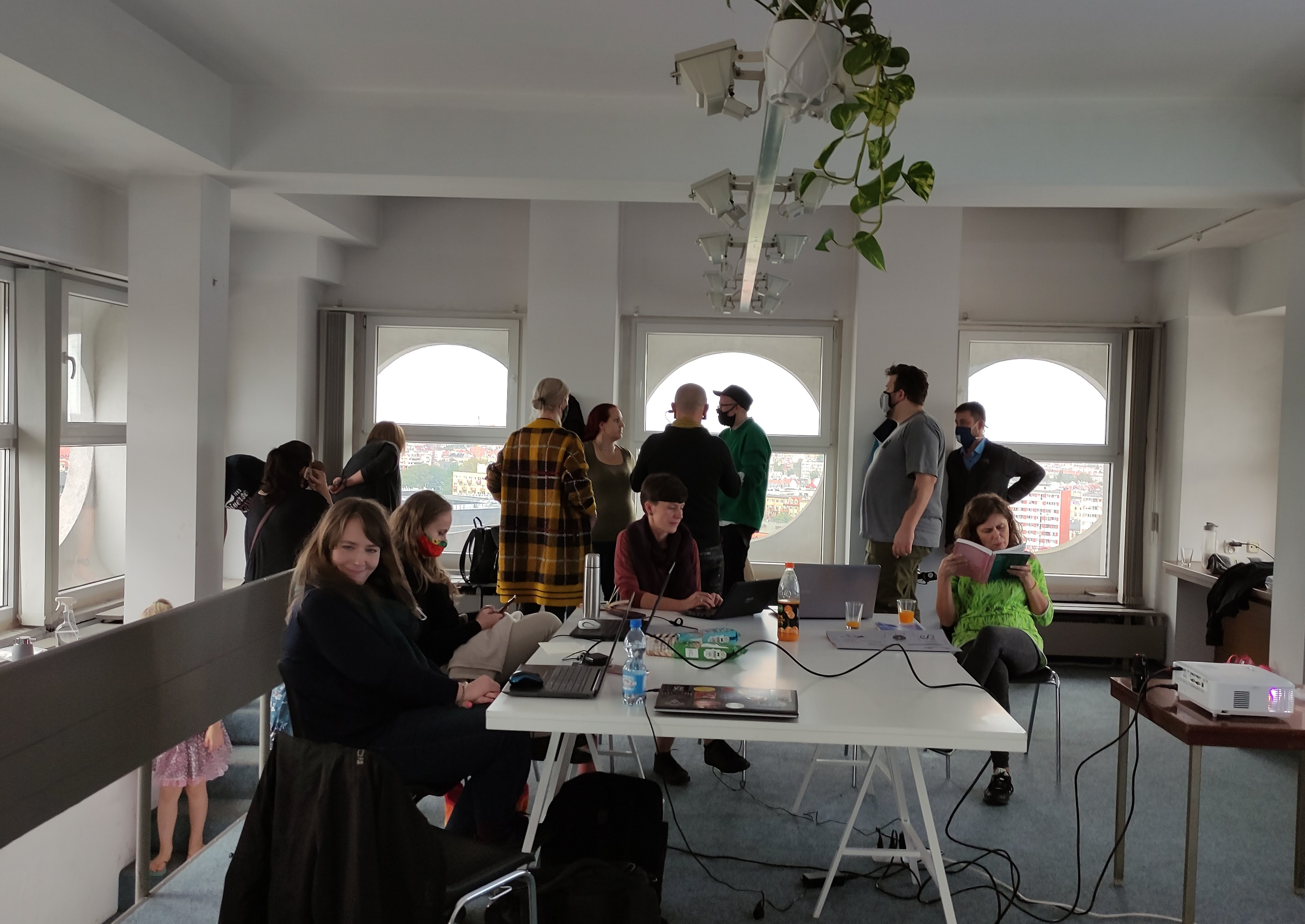
Interior of a two-level communal room with a bathroom on the flat roof, "designed to be greened" as a recreational terrace of a residential block

=== Panoramas ===
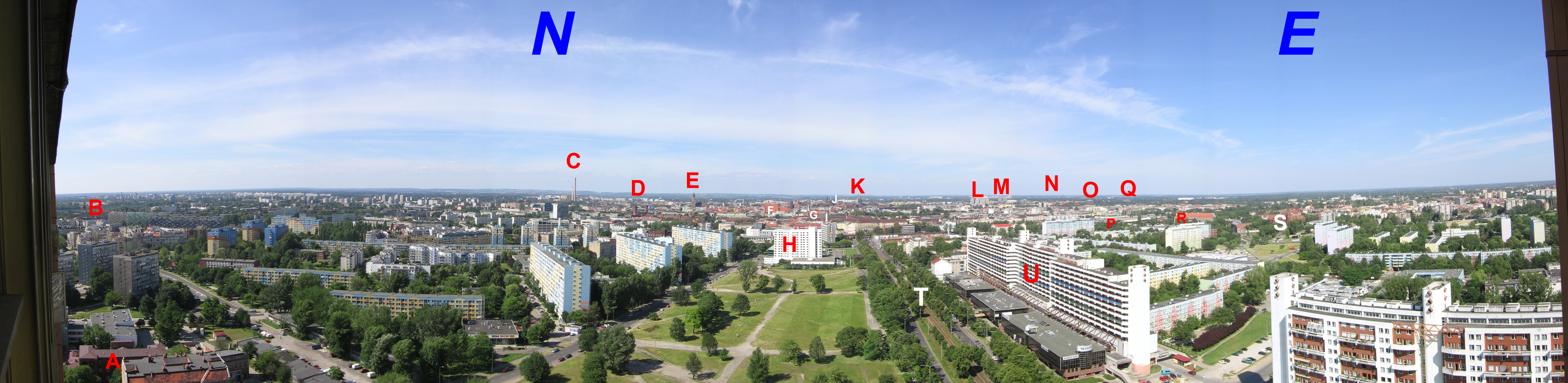
High-rises in the city panorama (marked with the letter L)

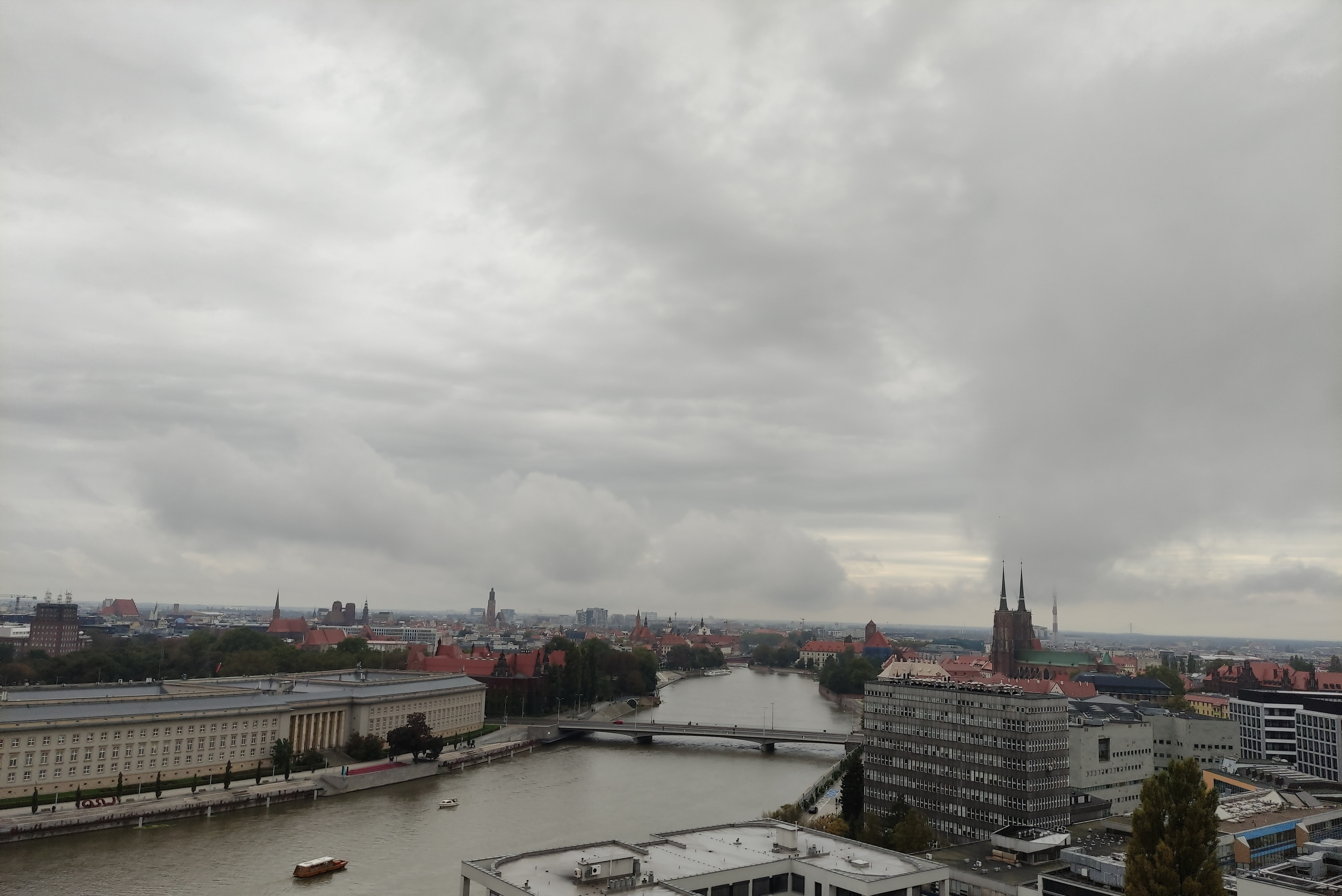
View of western Wrocław from the observation terrace of one of the high-rises

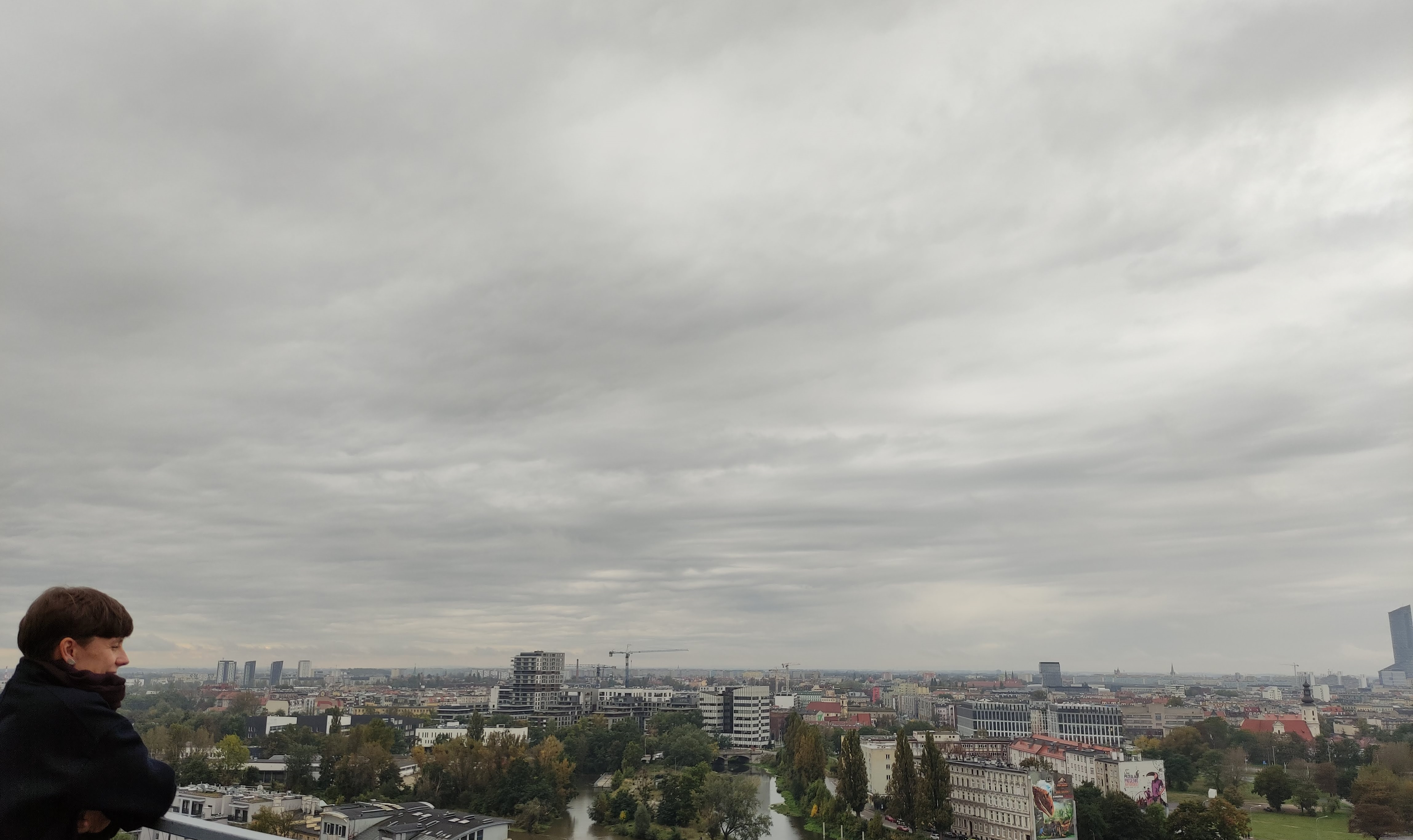
View of southern Wrocław from the observation terrace of one of the high-rises

== See also ==
- Media related to Manhattan estate, Wrocław at Wikimedia Commons
- Grunwald Bridge
- Grunwald Square
