= Chołowice =

- Village
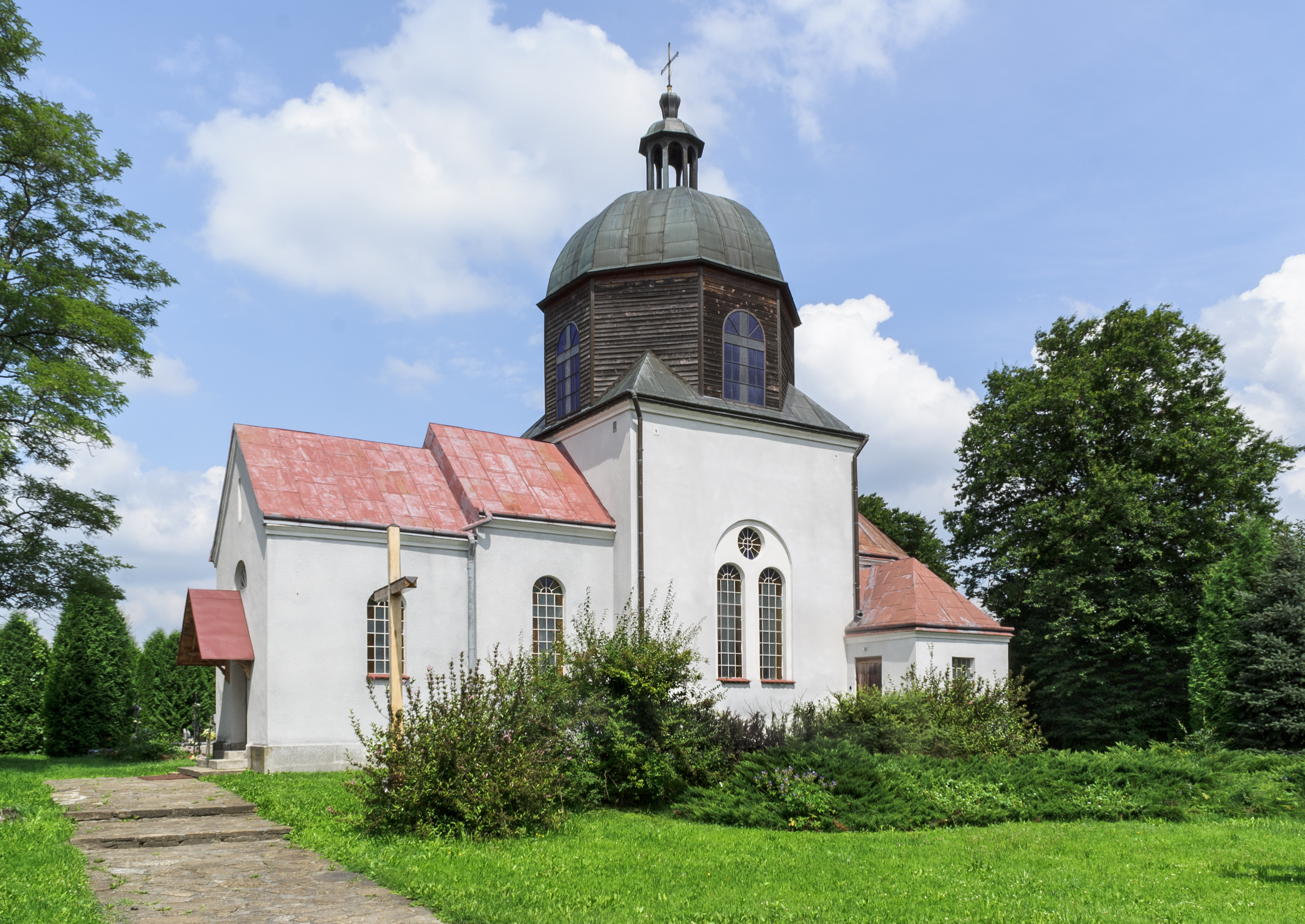
- Greek Catholic church of Saint Archangel Michael

- Location within Poland
- Coordinates: 49°46′N 22°35′E
- Country: Poland
- Voivodeship: Subcarpathian
- County: Przemyśl
- Gmina: Krasiczyn

Chołowice [xɔwɔˈvit͡sɛ] is a village in the administrative district of Gmina Krasiczyn, within Przemyśl County, Subcarpathian Voivodeship, in south-eastern Poland.
