= Brylińce =

- Village
- Location within Poland
- Coordinates: 49°43′N 22°40′E
- Country: Poland
- Voivodeship: Subcarpathian
- County: Przemyśl
- Gmina: Krasiczyn

Brylińce [brɨˈliɲt͡sɛ] is a village in the administrative district of Gmina Krasiczyn, within Przemyśl County, Subcarpathian Voivodeship, in south-eastern Poland.
