= Dybawka =

- Village
- Location within Poland
- Coordinates: 49°46′41″N 22°41′21″E
- Country: Poland
- Voivodeship: Podkarpackie
- County: Przemyśl
- Gmina: Krasiczyn
- Population: 357

Dybawka [dɨˈbafka] is a village in the administrative district of Gmina Krasiczyn, within Przemyśl County, Podkarpackie Voivodeship, in southeastern Poland.

== Manufacture ==
The Przemyśl has "long been famous for manufacturing...elaborately carved wooden and meerschaum pipes and cigar cutters."
