= Prałkowce =

- Village
- Location within Poland
- Coordinates: 49°47′N 22°44′E
- Country: Poland
- Voivodeship: Subcarpathian
- County: Przemyśl
- Gmina: Krasiczyn

Prałkowce [prau̯ˈkɔft͡sɛ] is a village in the administrative district of Gmina Krasiczyn, within Przemyśl County, Subcarpathian Voivodeship, in southeastern Poland.

== History ==
The village was first mentioned in historical records in 1474. From the second half of the nineteenth century the village was owned by the Drużbacki family. In 1921 it contained 108 houses and 606 inhabitants. By 1938, its population had grown to 2,000. After the Second World War residents of Ukrainian ethnicity were displaced.

== Main sights ==
Fort no. VII “Prałkowce” - located on a hill on the southwest side of the village. It is a part of the Przemyśl fortress, and was partly destroyed in 1915.

Church - former Eastern Orthodox Church. The church was built in 1842. After the removal of Ukrainians, the church was abandoned. In the 1960s the church became home to a Roman Catholic parish.

Wooden bell tower - first built in the sixteenth century and reconstructed in 1967.
