= Śliwnica, Gmina Krasiczyn =

Śliwnica
- Village
- Location within Poland
- Coordinates: 49°45′43″N 22°38′13″E
- Country: Poland
- Voivodeship: Subcarpathian
- County: Przemyśl
- Gmina: Krasiczyn

Śliwnica [ɕlivˈnit͡sa] is a village in the administrative district of Gmina Krasiczyn, within Przemyśl County, Subcarpathian Voivodeship, in south-eastern Poland.
