= Mielnów =

- Village
- Location within Poland
- Coordinates: 49°46′N 22°37′E
- Country: Poland
- Voivodeship: Subcarpathian
- County: Przemyśl
- Gmina: Krasiczyn

Mielnów [ˈmjɛlnuf] is a village in the administrative district of Gmina Krasiczyn, within Przemyśl County, Subcarpathian Voivodeship, in south-eastern Poland.
