= Zalesie, Przemyśl County =

Zalesie
- Village
- Location within Poland
- Coordinates: 49°45′N 22°41′E
- Country: Poland
- Voivodeship: Subcarpathian
- County: Przemyśl
- Gmina: Krasiczyn

Zalesie [zaˈlɛɕɛ] is a village in the administrative district of Gmina Krasiczyn, within Przemyśl County, Subcarpathian Voivodeship, in south-eastern Poland.
