= Cisowa, Podkarpackie Voivodeship =

Cisowa
- Village
- Location within Poland
- Coordinates: 49°43′N 22°36′E
- Country: Poland
- Voivodeship: Subcarpathian
- County: Przemyśl
- Gmina: Krasiczyn
- Population: 130

Cisowa [t͡ɕiˈsɔva] is a village in the administrative district of Gmina Krasiczyn, within Przemyśl County, Subcarpathian Voivodeship, in south-eastern Poland.
