= Gmina Krasiczyn =

Gmina Krasiczyn Krasiczyn Commune
- Gmina
- Coat of arms
- Interactive map of Gmina Krasiczyn
- Coordinates (Krasiczyn): 49°46′N 22°40′E
- Country: Poland
- Voivodeship: Subcarpathian
- County: Przemyśl County
- Seat: Krasiczyn

Area
  - Total: 127.17 km^{2} (49.10 sq mi)

Population (2013)
  - Total: 5,122
  - Density: 40.28/km^{2} (104.3/sq mi)
- Website: http://www.krasiczyn.pl/

Gmina Krasiczyn is a rural gmina (administrative district) in Przemyśl County, Subcarpathian Voivodeship, in south-eastern Poland. Its seat is the village of Krasiczyn, which lies approximately 8 kilometres (5 mi) west of Przemyśl and 56 km (35 mi) south-east of the regional capital Rzeszów.

The gmina covers an area of 127.17 square kilometres (49.1 sq mi), and as of 2006 its total population is 4,794 (5,122 in 2013).

The gmina contains part of the protected area called Pogórze Przemyskie Landscape Park.

== Villages ==
Gmina Krasiczyn contains the villages and settlements of Brylińce, Chołowice, Cisowa, Dybawka, Korytniki, Krasice, Krasiczyn, Krzeczkowa, Mielnów, Olszany, Prałkowce, Rokszyce, Śliwnica, Tarnawce and Zalesie.

== Neighbouring gminas ==
Gmina Krasiczyn is bordered by the city of Przemyśl and by the gminas of Bircza, Fredropol, Krzywcza and Przemyśl.
