= Tarnawce =

Village in Poland

- Village
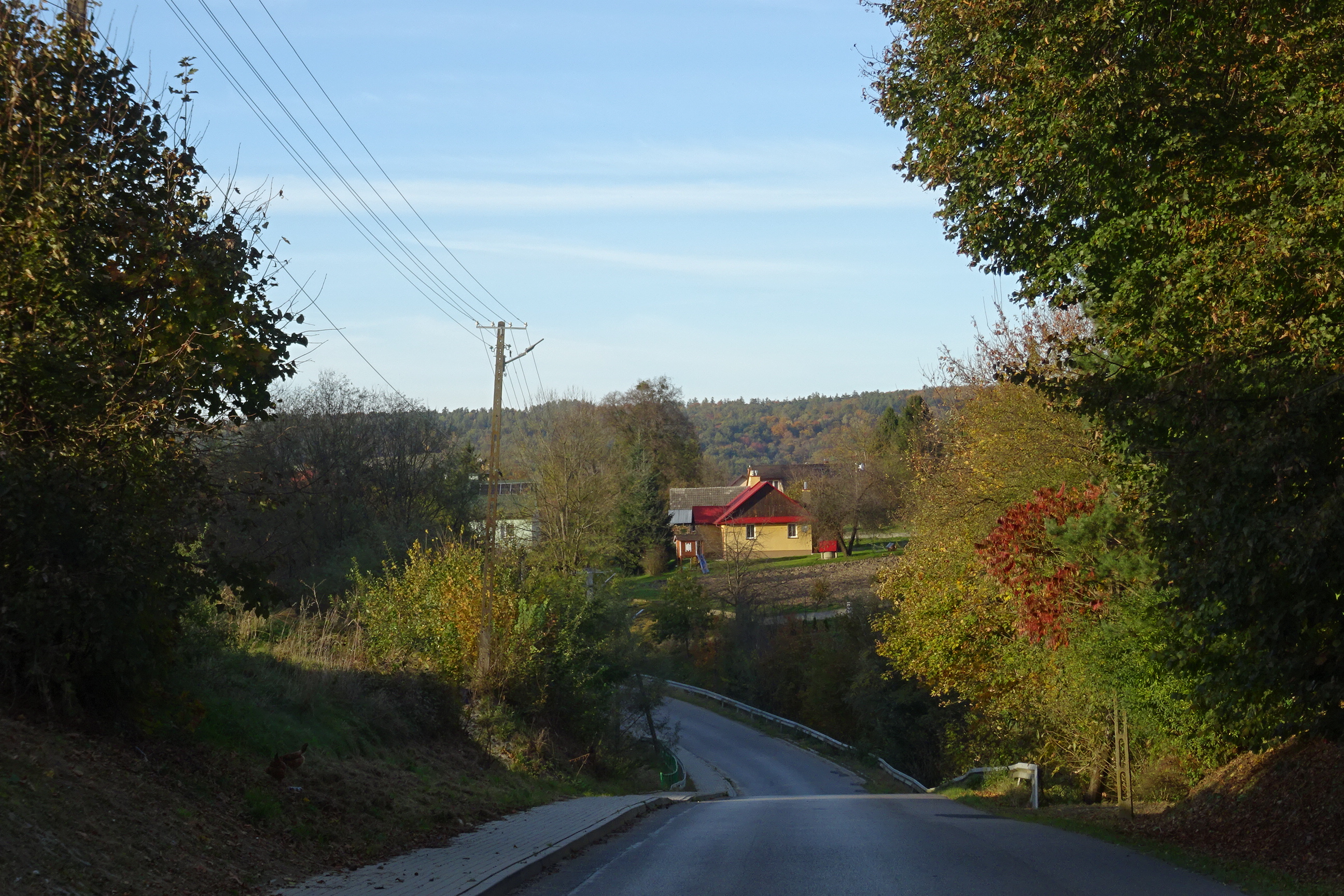

- Location within Poland
- Coordinates: 49°47′N 22°38′E
- Country: Poland
- Voivodeship: Subcarpathian
- County: Przemyśl
- Gmina: Krasiczyn
- Population: 440

Tarnawce [tarˈnaft͡sɛ] is a village in the administrative district of Gmina Krasiczyn, within Przemyśl County, Subcarpathian Voivodeship, in south-eastern Poland.
