= Grunwald Square (town square in Wrocław) =

Square in Wrocław, Poland

Coordinates: 51°6′41.68″N 17°3′37.81″E

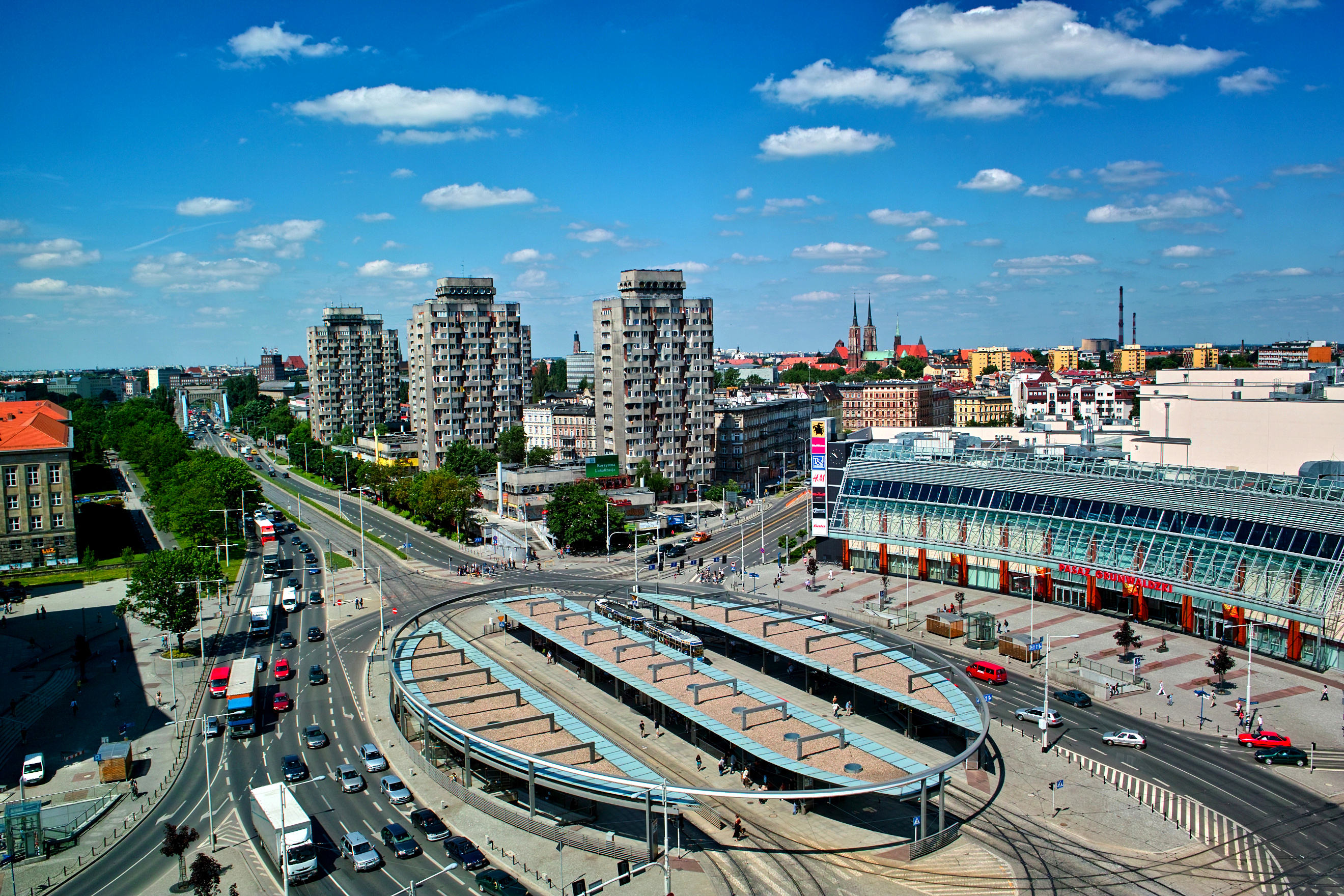
The Grunwald Square and the Reagan Roundabout

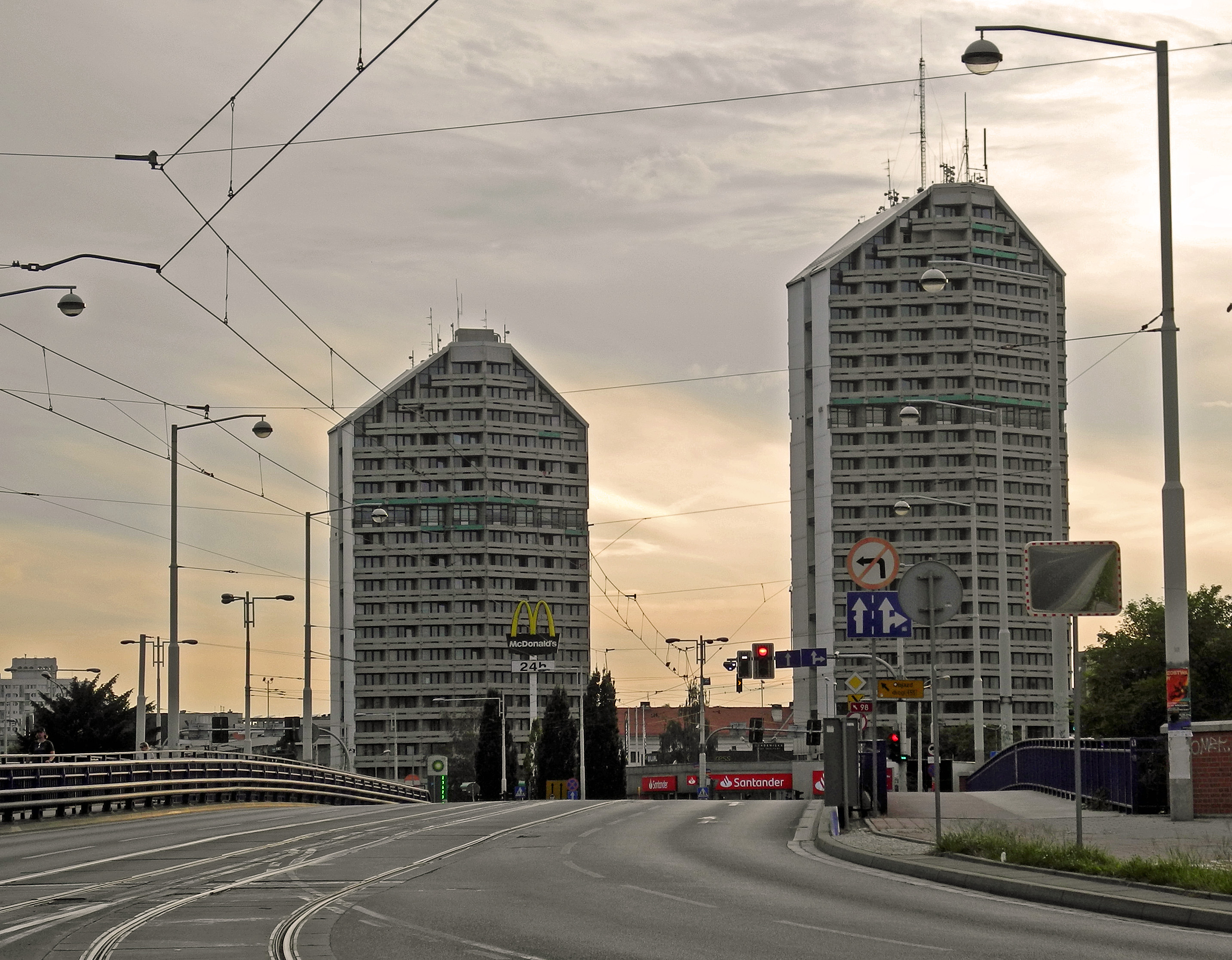
"Kredka" and Ołówek" (1975-82) student houses

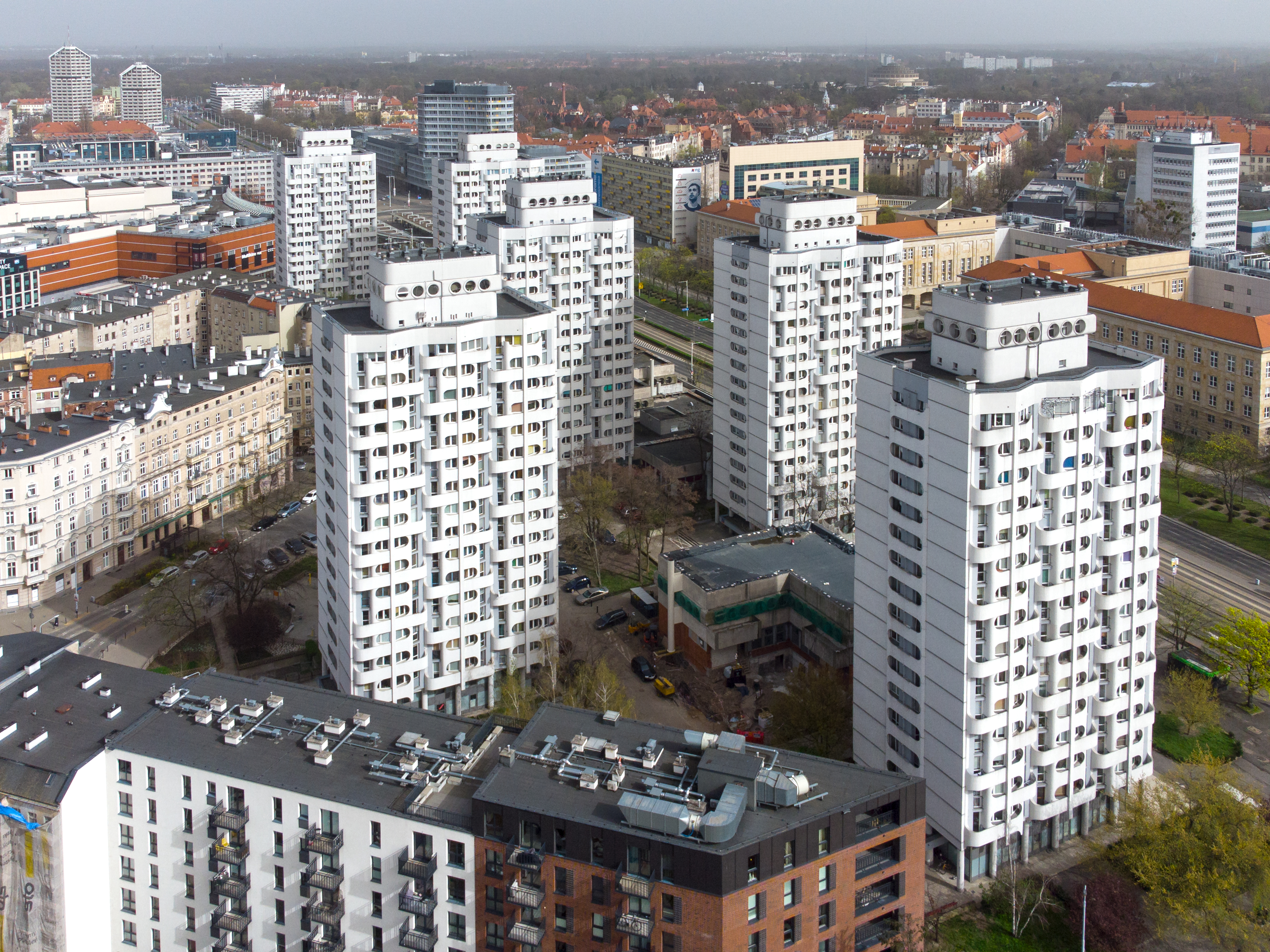
"Sedesowce" (1967-75)

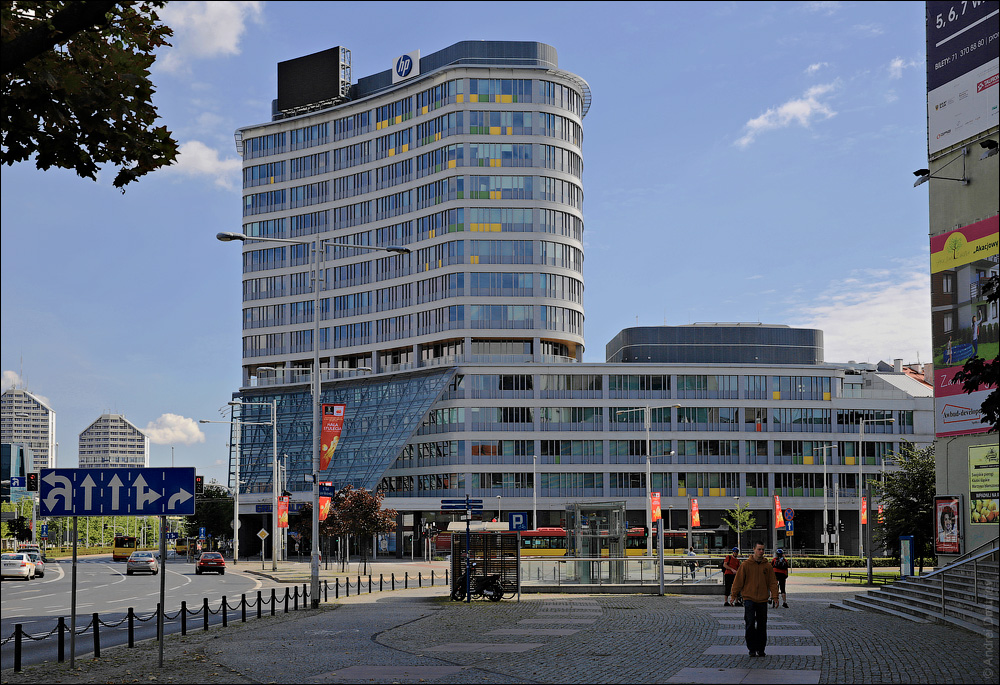
Grunwaldzki Center

The Grunwald Square (Polish: plac Grunwaldzki [ˈplad͡z ɡrunˈvalt͡skʲi]), named after the Battle of Grunwald) is a former square, currently a major street and important transit point in Wrocław, Poland. The nearby universities (Wrocław University of Science and Technology, Wrocław University of Environmental and Life Sciences, some departments of University of Wrocław) and their dormitories make it one of the centres of student life in Wrocław. The central portion of the Grunwald Square has been redeveloped in 2006-2007 into a large oval-shaped roundabout with a major public transport hub in its centre.

== History ==
The Grunwald Square was originally built in the late 20th century as a major southwest-northeast thoroughfare named Kaiserstraße (Imperial Street), which was designed to connect two newly constructed bridges, Grunwald Bridge and Szczytniki Bridge. During the Siege of Breslau in 1945, in the final months of World War II, the entire residential district along the Kaiserstraße was razed by order of the German Gauleiter Karl Hanke to construct a military airfield intended for use in resupplying the fortress city ("Festung Breslau"). The area remained undeveloped for a long time after World War II, and the huge empty space came to resemble a square rather than a street, influencing the post-war name change into plac Grunwaldzki (Grunwald Square). The first development plan for this area was drawn up by Marian Spychalski in late 1949. In 1951, the SARP announced a competition for the design of Grunwaldzki Square. All the designs were in the style of Socialist Realism and were never implemented. Post-war development started in the 1950s with construction of new buildings for the Wrocław University of Science and Technology, which was followed by new projects for two other nearby universities, Wrocław University of Environmental and Life Sciences (then known as Agricultural Academy in Wrocław) and the University of Wrocław. A major communist-era landmark, the Manhattan Estate complex, colloquially known as "Sedesowce" (lit. toilet seats) or "Manhattan", was built in 1967-1975 at the western end of the square, while another landmark, "Kredka" and "Ołówek" student houses, were constructed in 1975-1982 at the eastern end. The central part of the square remained undeveloped until a redevelopment in 2006, and housed an improvised, open air market.

== Redevelopment ==
In March 2006, the Grunwald Square was closed and works on a total reconstruction started. The reconstruction project aimed to rebuild the central intersection into a large, oval-shaped roundabout (now known as the Ronald Reagan Roundabout). The square was due to be opened again for traffic in December 2006, but the renovation works were to continue until August 2007. By January 2008, the bus and tram stop in the centre of the roundabout had been completed, although the underground passage leading to remained unfinished, contributing to traffic congestion in rush hours. Most of the reconstruction work had been completed by May 2008. Concurrently with this redevelopment, a project to build a shopping centre named Pasaż Grunwaldzki in place of the open-air market was started. This project involved building-over one of the last empty plots of land along the square and completed its transformation into a street.
