= Rokszyce, Podkarpackie Voivodeship =

Rokszyce
- Village
- Location within Poland
- Coordinates: 49°44′N 22°40′E
- Country: Poland
- Voivodeship: Subcarpathian
- County: Przemyśl
- Gmina: Krasiczyn

Rokszyce [rɔkˈʂɨt͡sɛ] is a village in the administrative district of Gmina Krasiczyn, within Przemyśl County, Subcarpathian Voivodeship, in south-eastern Poland.
