= Olszany, Podkarpackie Voivodeship =

Olszany
- Village

- Location within Poland
- Coordinates: 49°44′37″N 22°38′13″E
- Country: Poland
- Voivodeship: Subcarpathian
- County: Przemyśl
- Gmina: Krasiczyn

Population
  - Total: 410
- Time zone: UTC+1 (CET)
  - Summer (DST): UTC+2 (CEST)
- Vehicle registration: RPR

Olszany [ɔlˈʂanɨ] is a village in the administrative district of Gmina Krasiczyn, within Przemyśl County, Subcarpathian Voivodeship, in south-eastern Poland.

== History ==
During the German occupation of Poland (World War II), the Polish resistance was active in the area. In June 1943, the Home Army successfully raided a German police station in Olszany.
