= Saint Onuphrius Church, Posada Rybotycka =

Polish church in Posada Rybotycka, Poland

Saint Onuphrius Church
- Cerkiew św. Onufrego
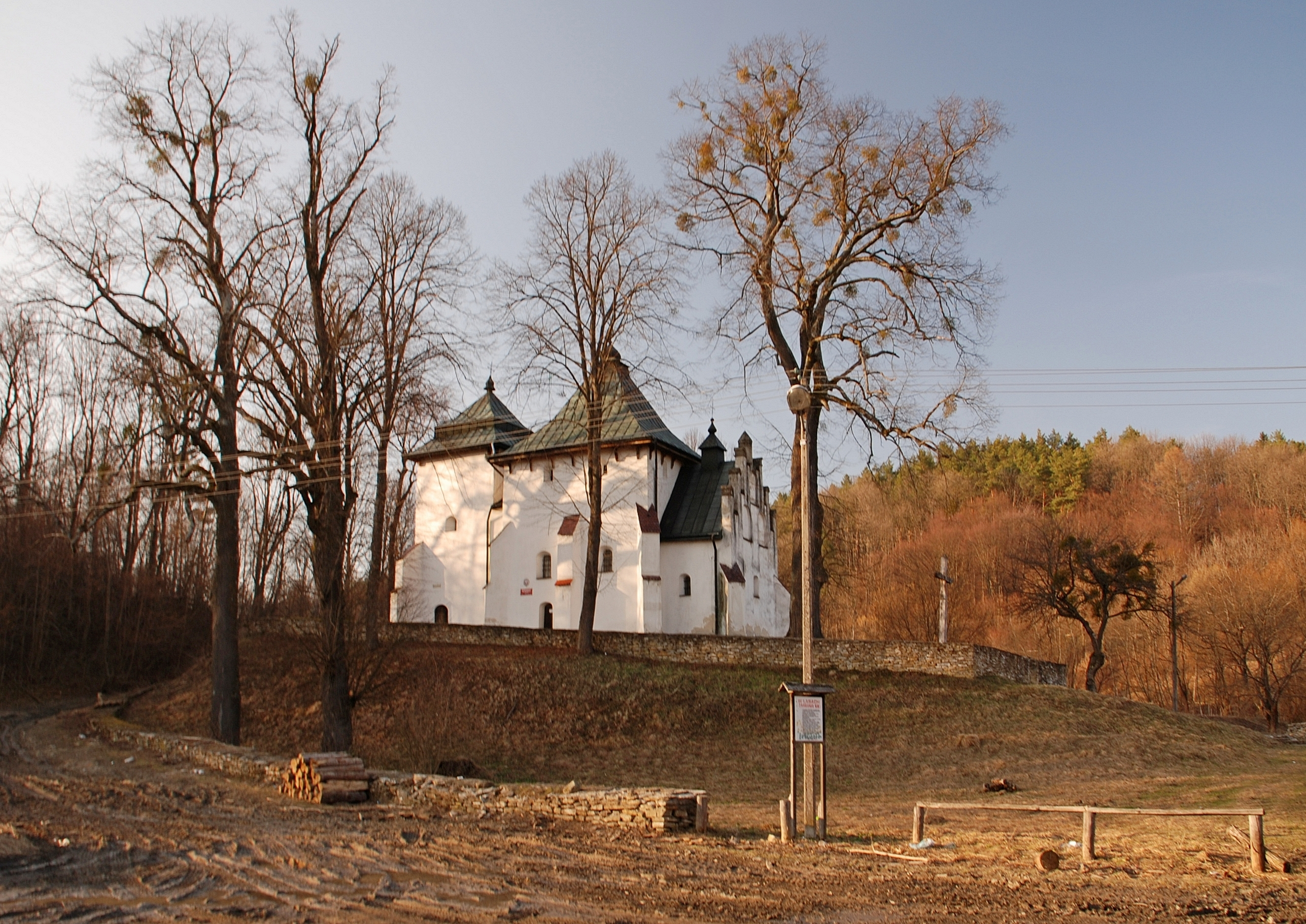

- Location within Poland

Location
- Location: Posada Rybotycka
- Interactive map of Saint Onuphrius Church
- Coordinates: 49°39′56.95″N 22°36′04.37″E

Saint Onuphrius Church (Polish: Cerkiew św. Onufrego) is a brick defensive church located in Posada Rybotycka, in the Gmina Fredropol, in the Przemyśl County. It is the oldest surviving church in Poland.

== History ==
The church is located on the western edge of the village, on a hill. Until 1692, it was an Orthodox church, later a Greek Catholic church. The church consists of three connected towers with hipped roofs. There are loopholes in the thick stone walls. The oldest part, dating from the turn of the 14th and 15th centuries, is the chancel with Gothic gables. The square nave with a barrel vault and a defensive tower dates from the 15th century.

The youngest part, dating back to the early 16th century, is the western section, also built in the form of a defensive tower, housing a porch and a narthex, and a chapel for monks on the upper floor. On the walls of this part, inscriptions in Latin and Ruthenian with the dates 1506 and 1514 have been preserved, carved into the plaster with a sharp tool. They are not part of the planned decor; today they would be classified as acts of vandalism. The medieval brick wall of the iconostasis has two gates (later ones had three).

The church belonged to the Basilian monastery until the 18th century, later becoming a parish church. The parish also included the branch Church of Saint John the Baptist in Borysławka.

According to tradition, the last Orthodox bishop of Przemyśl, Michał Kopystyński, who died in 1642 in Kopysno, was buried in the crypt of the church. After the displacement of the inhabitants in 1945, the church was devastated and stripped of its furnishings.

It was renovated in the 1960s and 1980s. During the renovation in 1966, 16th-century Byzantine-style polychrome was discovered under many layers of paint. The church was a branch of the National Museum of Przemyśl, open during the summer season. On 14 October 2010, it was handed over to the Gmina Fredropol.

== Gallery ==
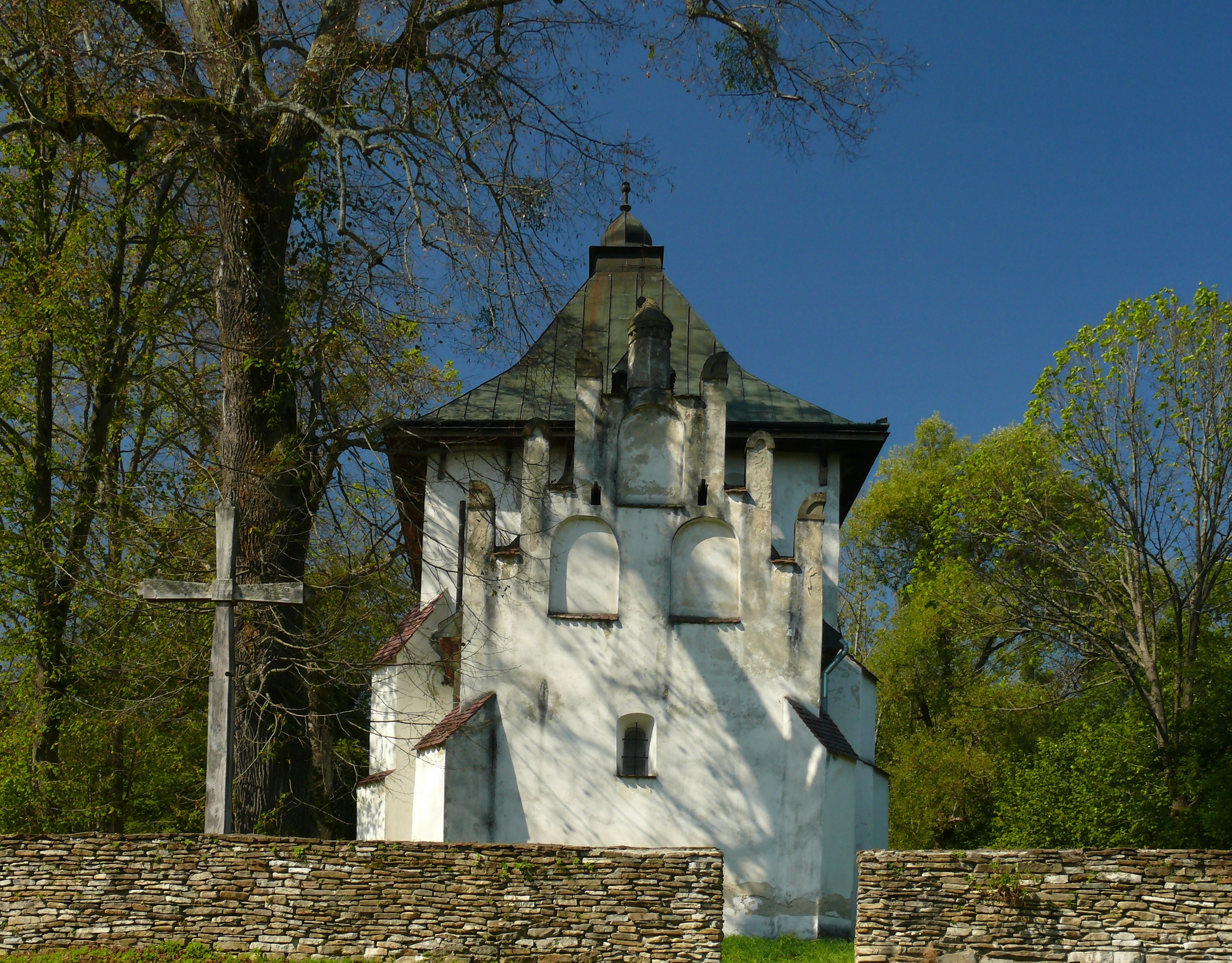
Front elevation

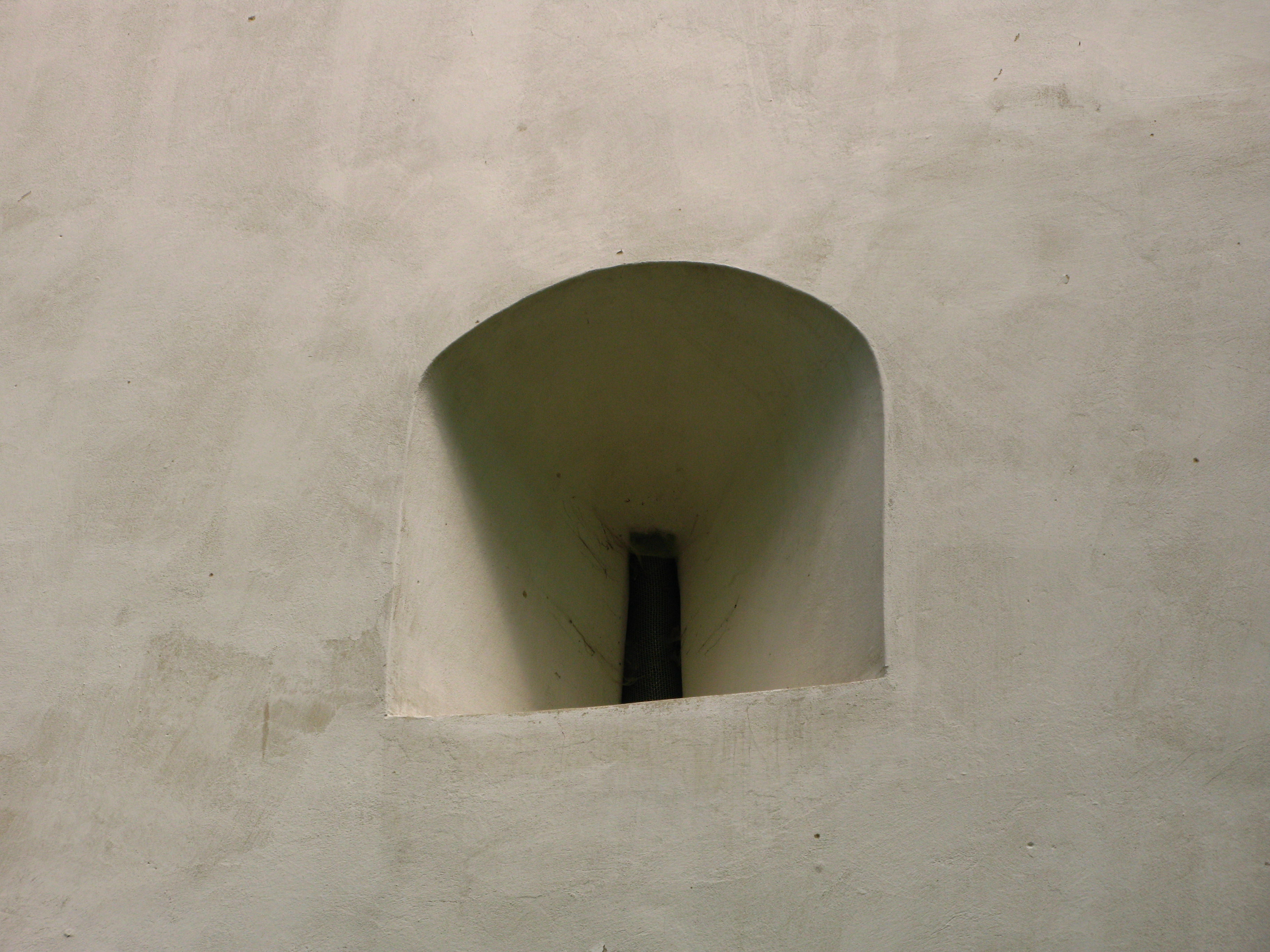
Building element

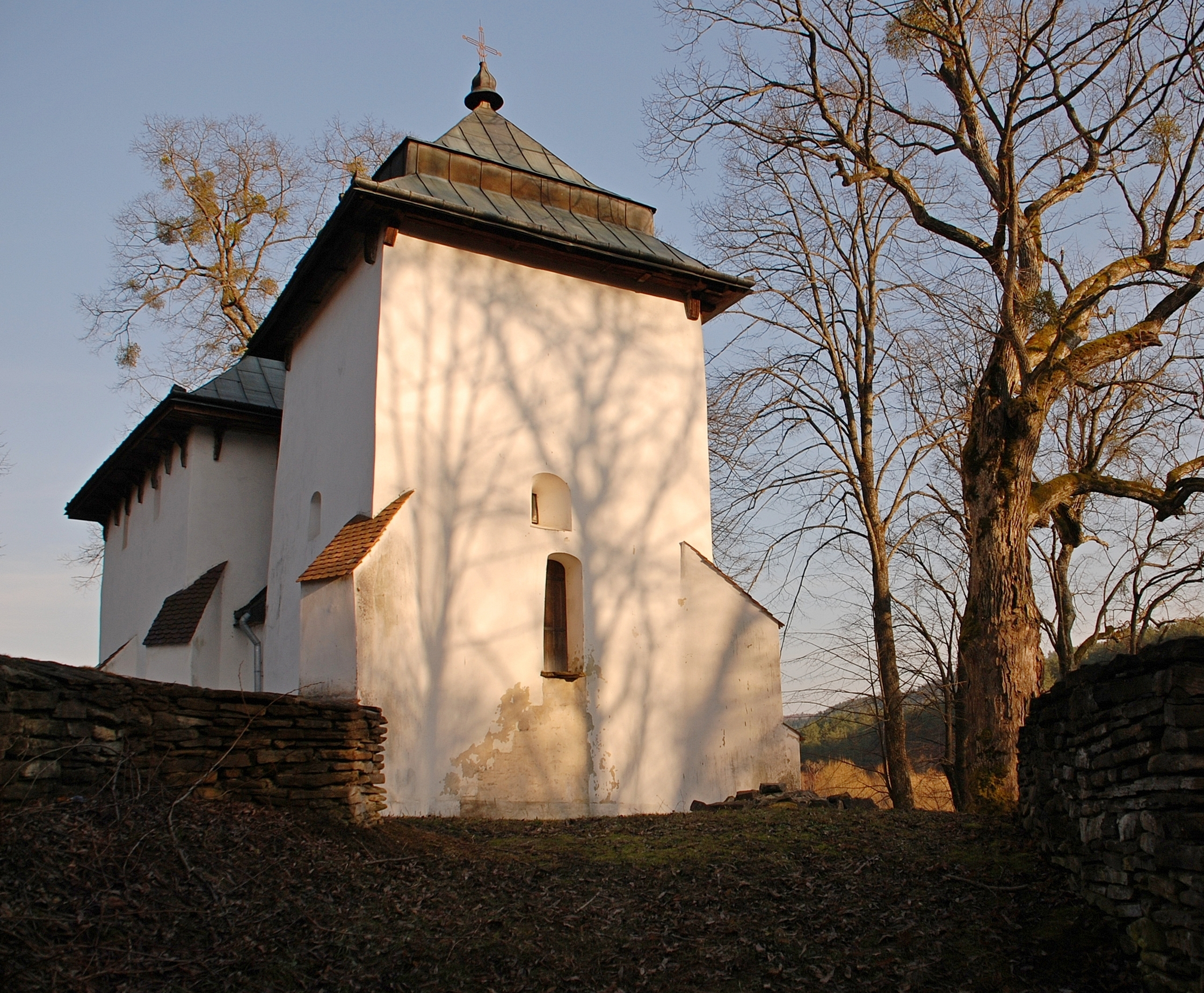
View from the presbytery

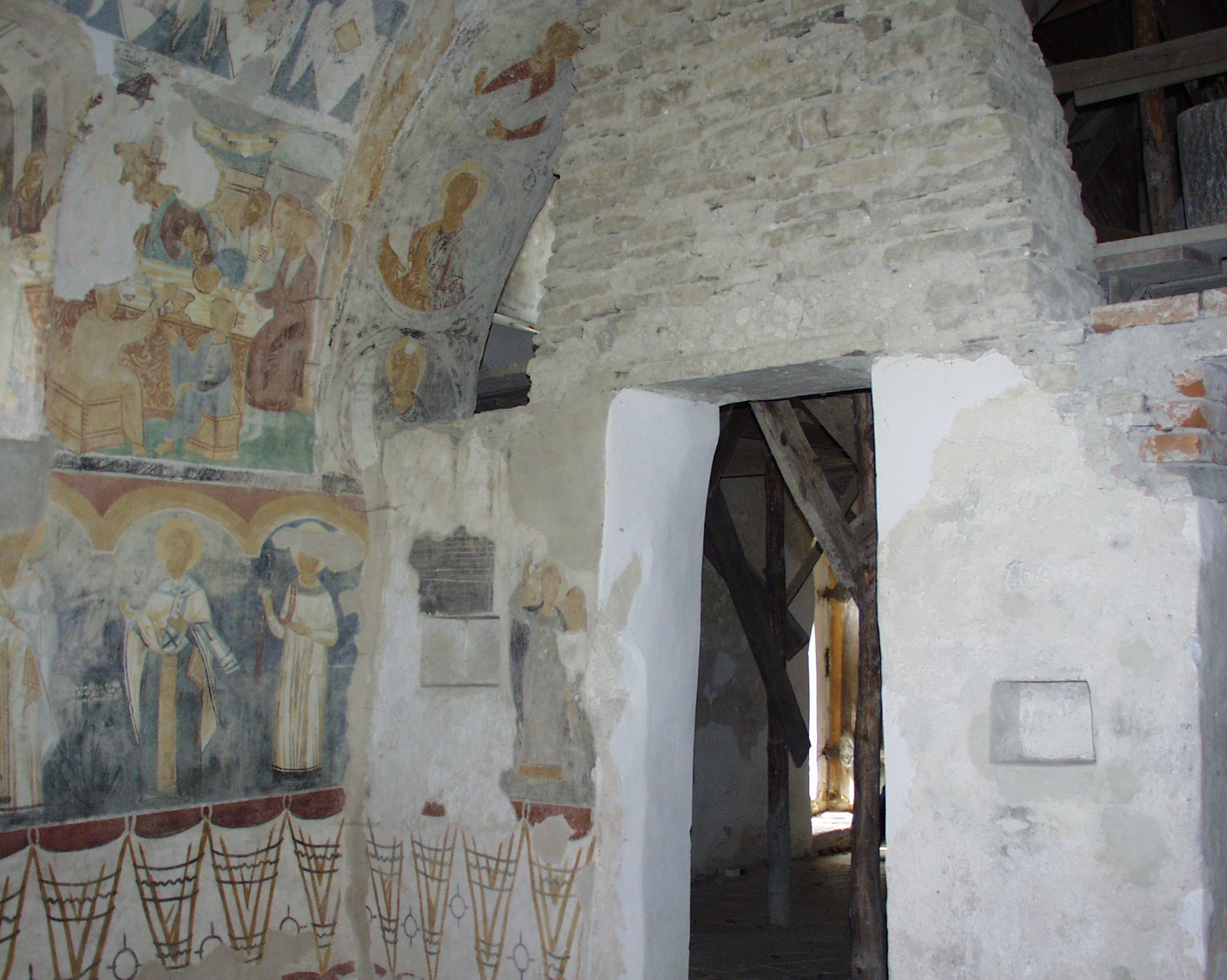
The interior of the church

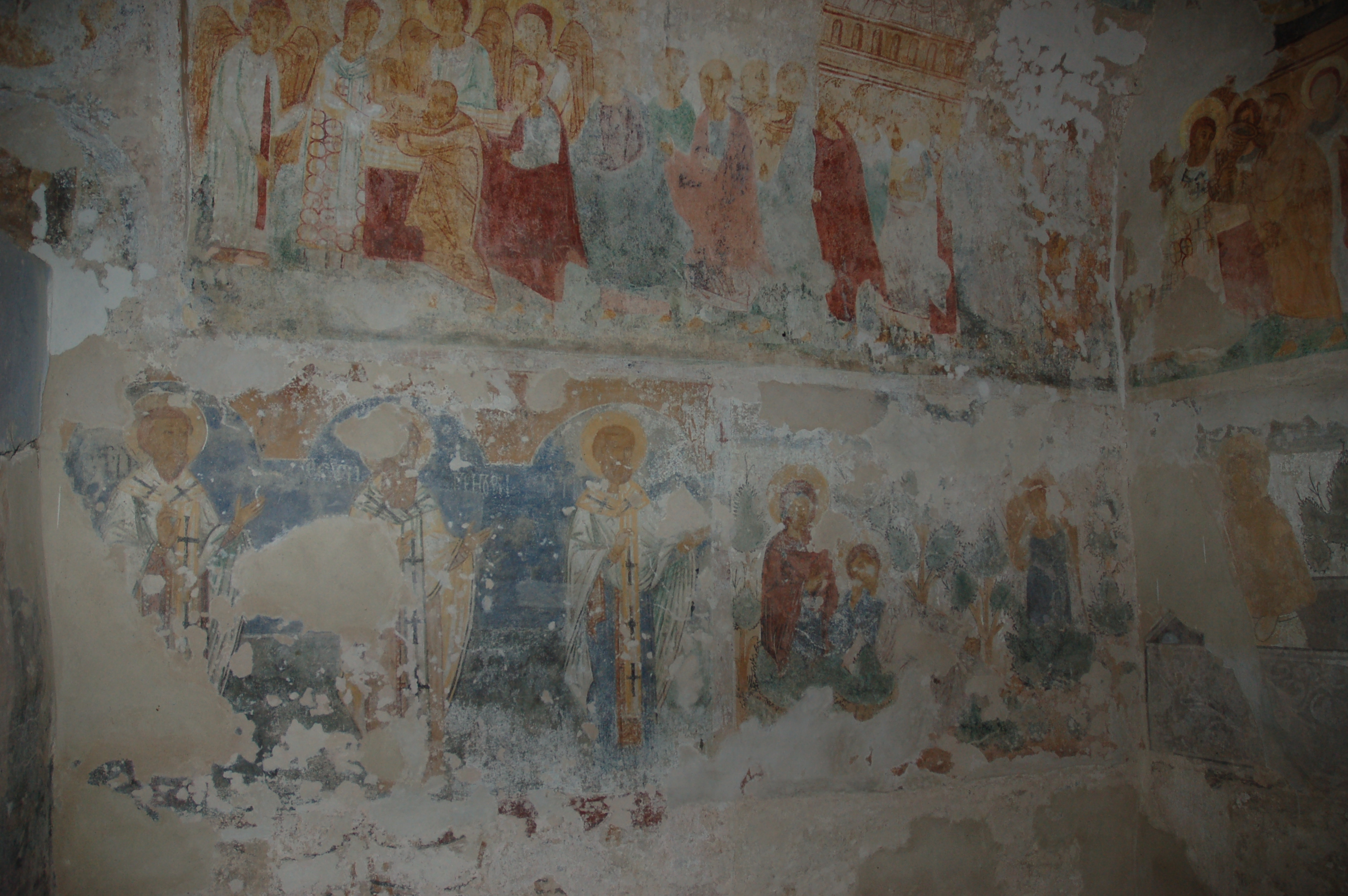
The interior of the church

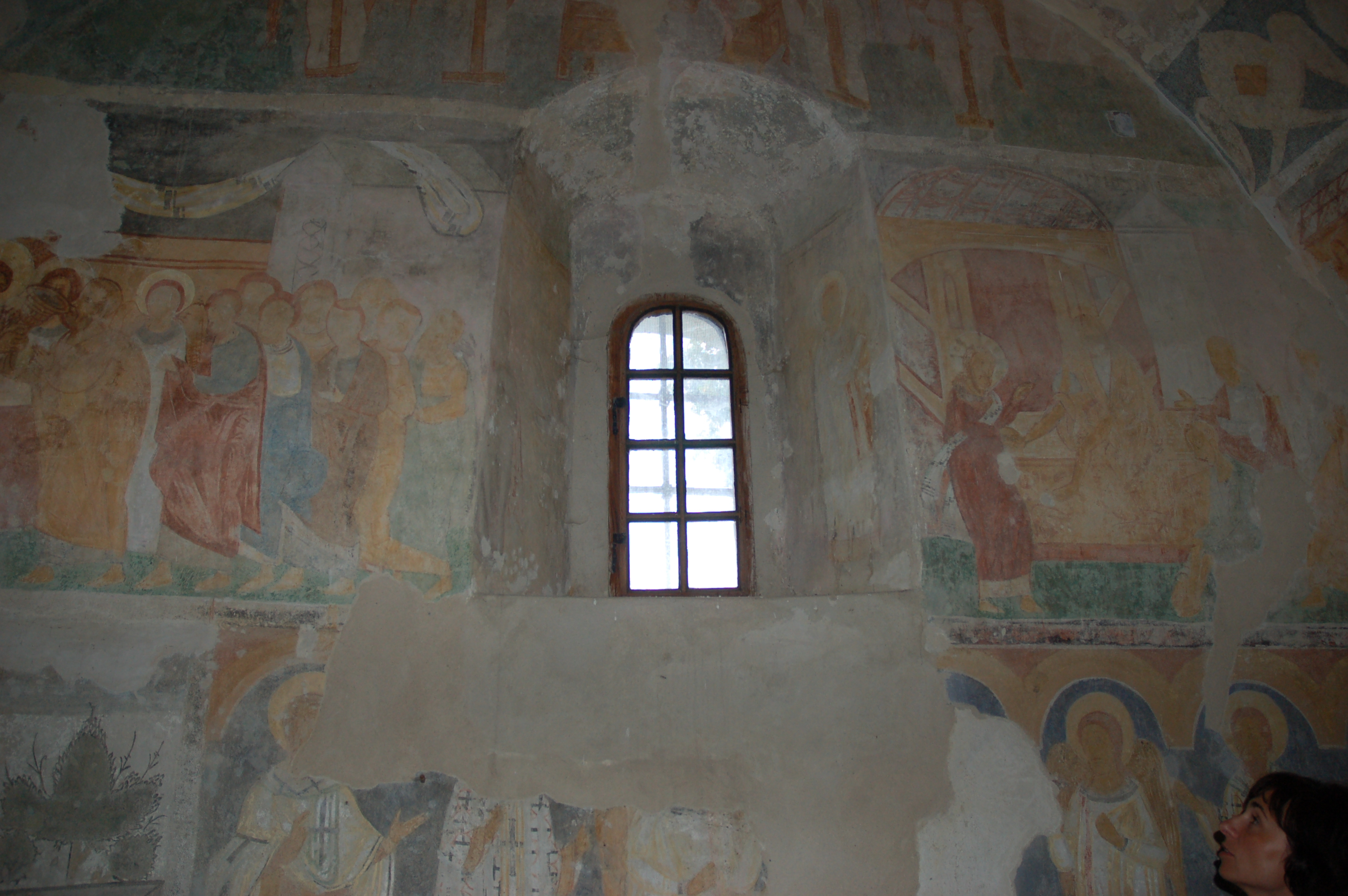
The interior of the church

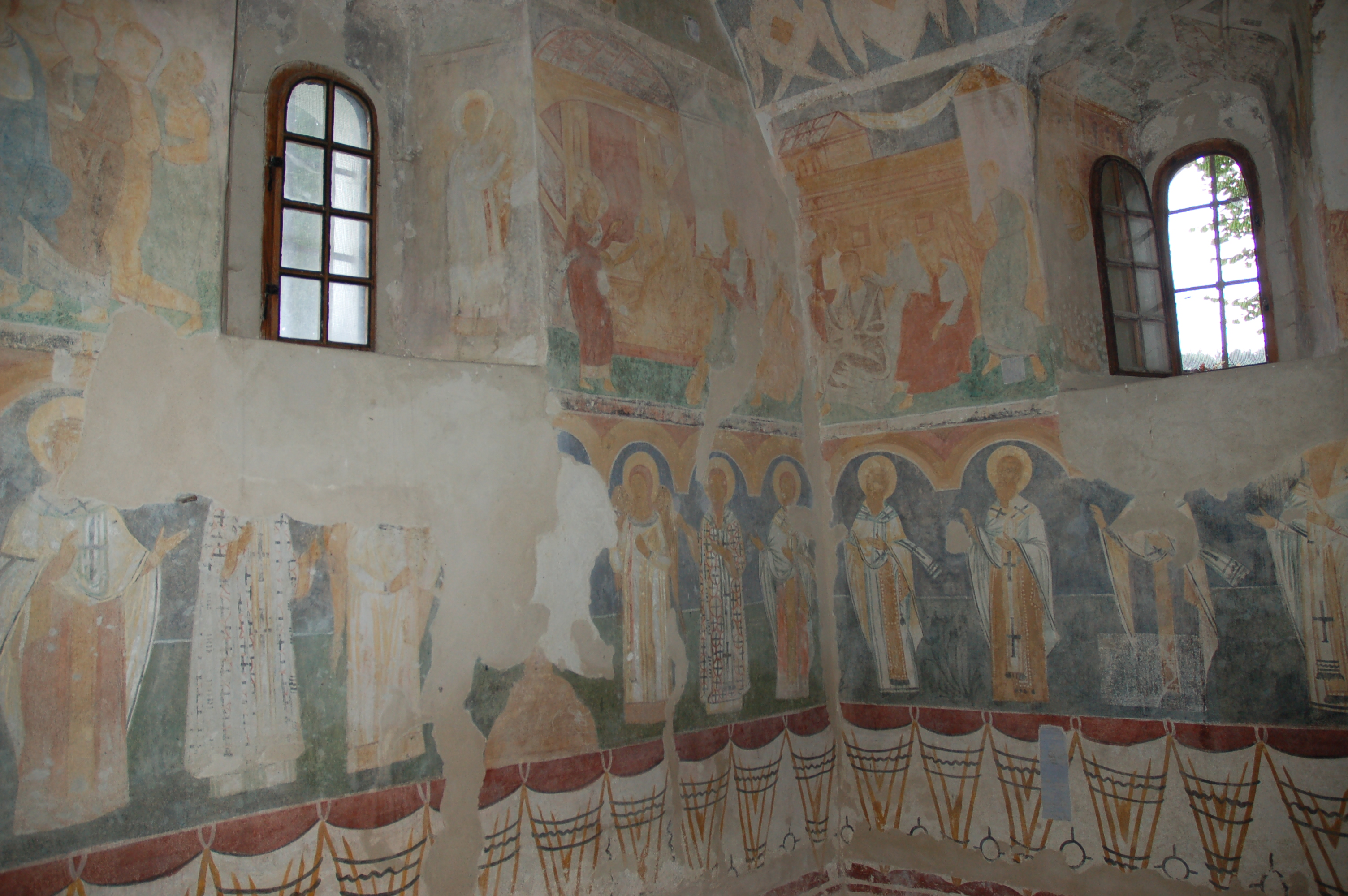
The interior of the church

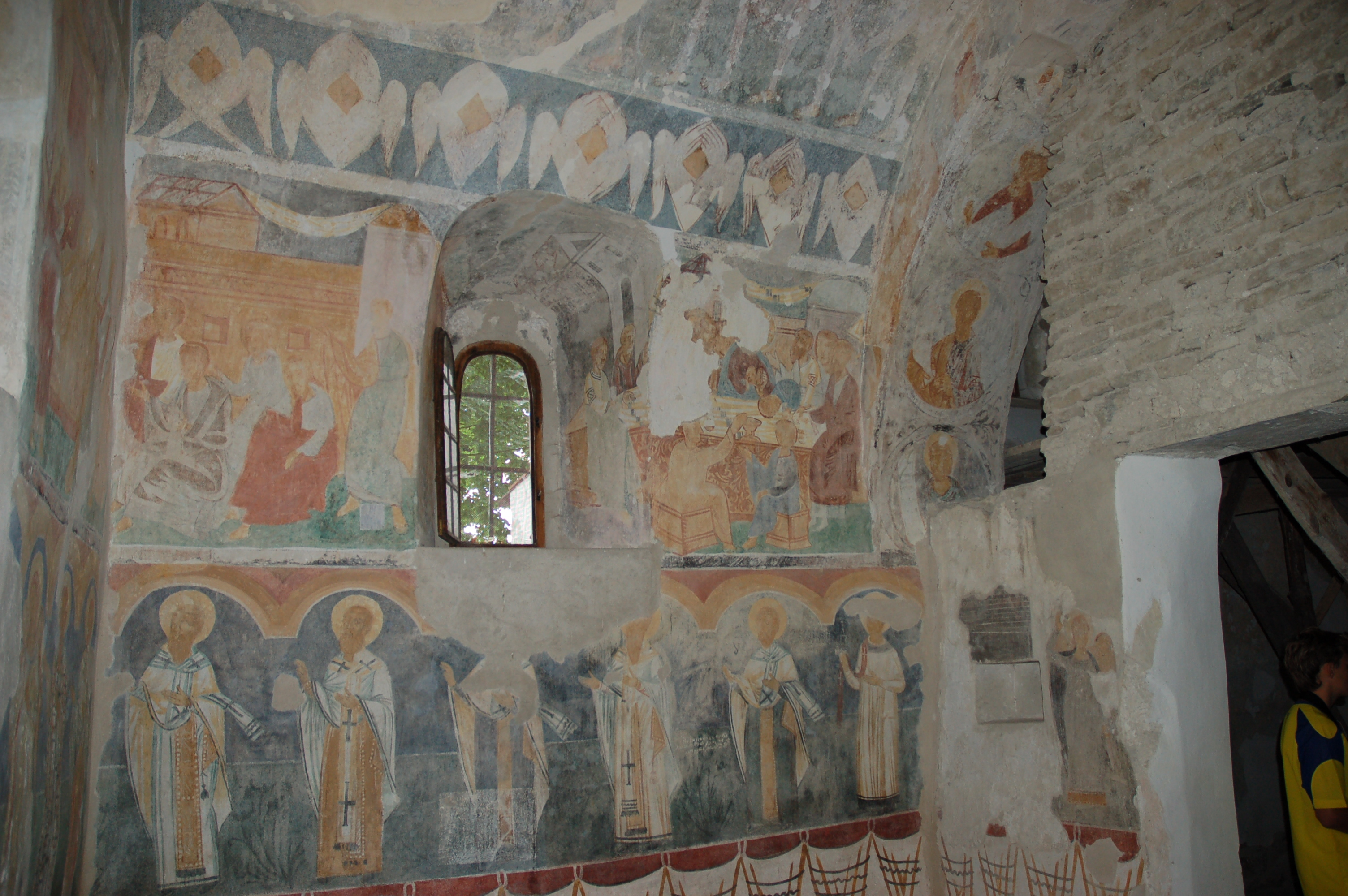
The interior of the church

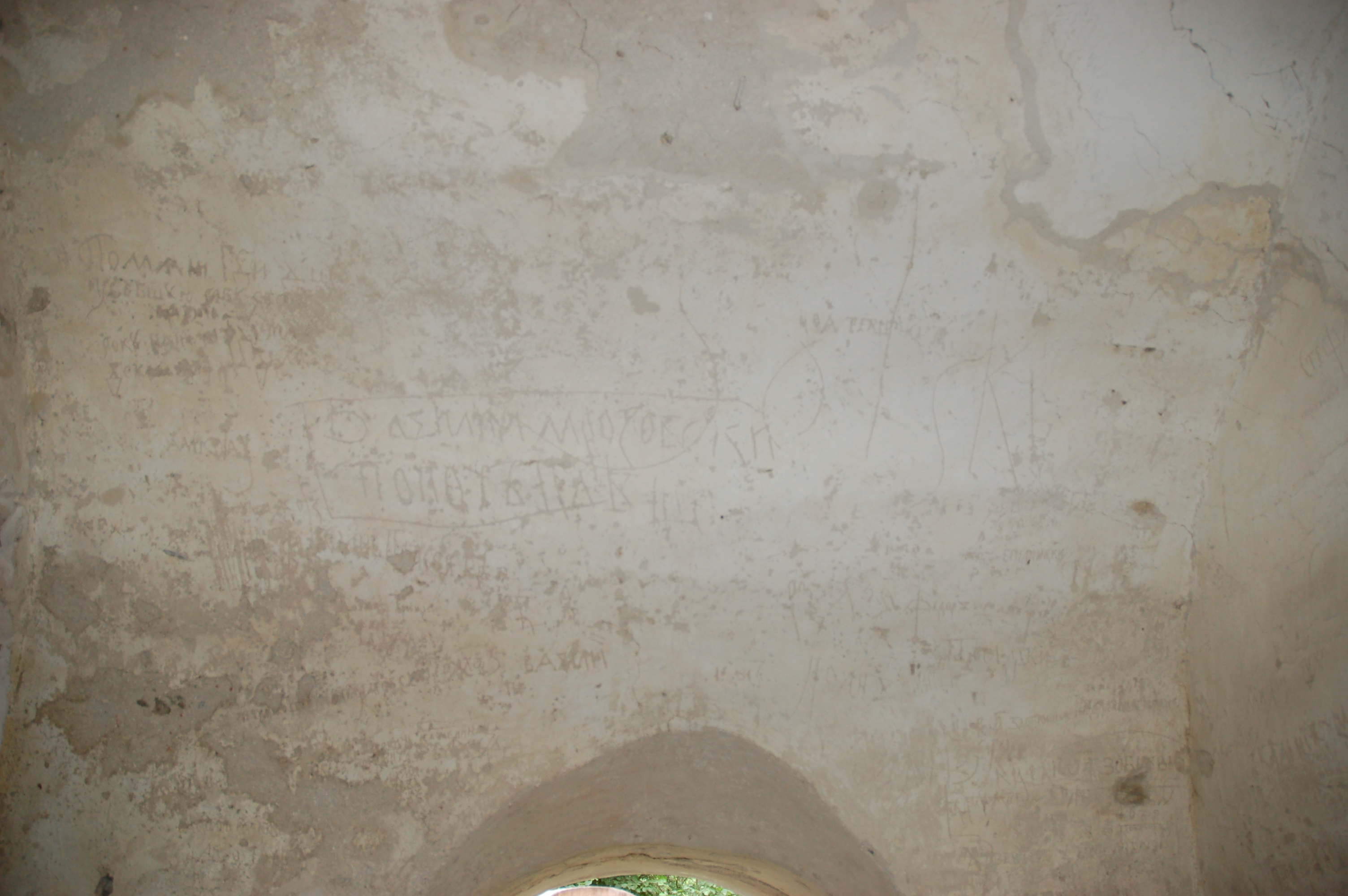
The interior of the church

== Bibliography ==
- Stanisław Kryciński, Pogórze Przemyskie, Rewasz, Warszawa 1992
- Agnieszka Gronek, Opuszczone dziedzictwo. O malowidłach w cerkwi św. Onufrego w Posadzie Rybotyckiej, Kraków: Księgarnia Akademicka 2015
