= Borysławka (tributary of Wiar) =

Borysławka Бориславка
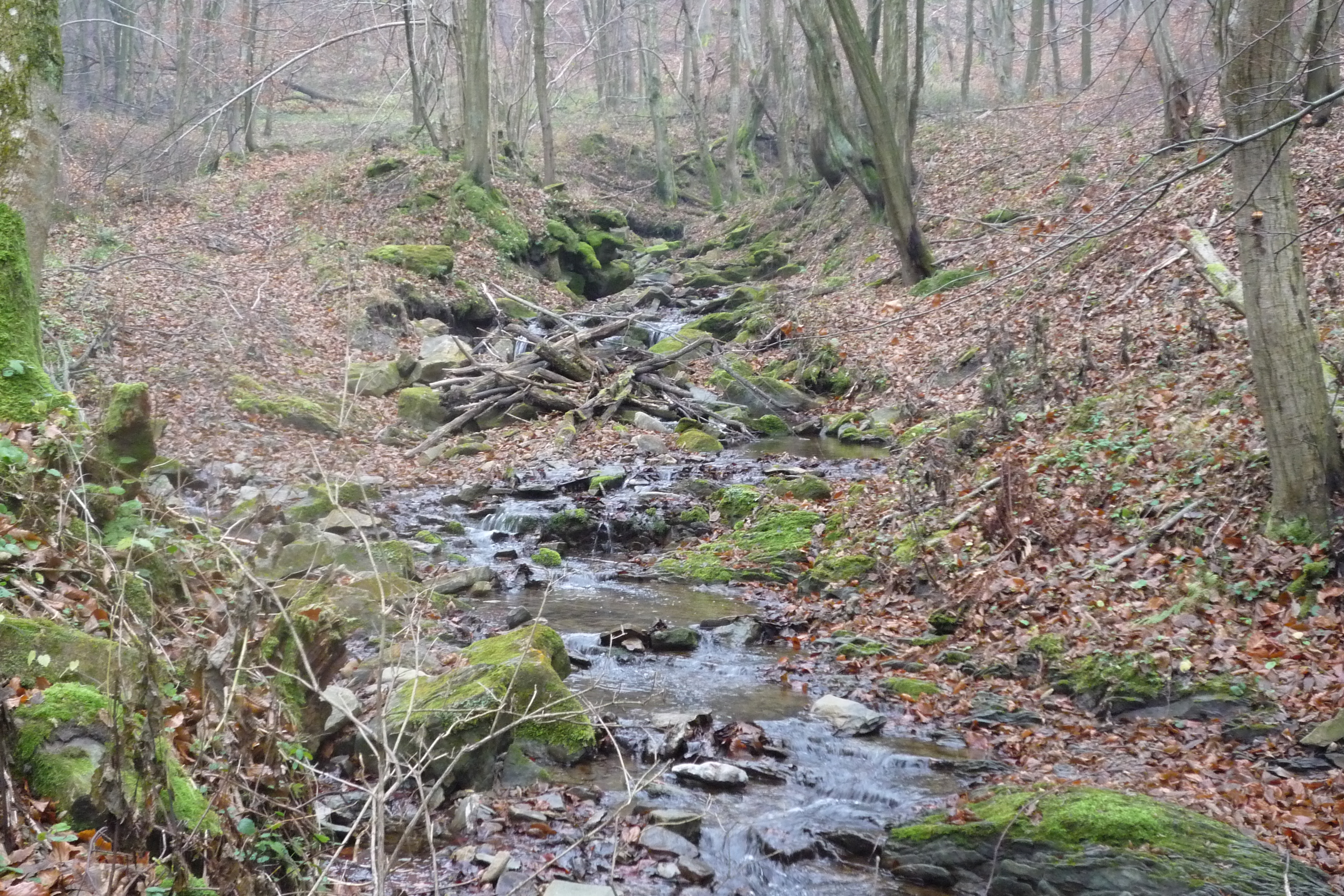

Location
- Country: Poland

Physical characteristics
- Source
  - location: Borysławka, Przemyśl County, Subcarpathian Voivodeship, Poland
- Mouth: Wiar
  - coordinates: 49°39′47″N 22°37′46″E

Borysławka is a stream in Poland, which flows within the village of Borysławka (now Gmina Fredropol, Przemyśl County, Podkarpackie Voivodeship, Poland). The stream is depicted on the map by Friedrich von Mieg of the 18th century.

It flows out from under the Turnica mountain range; it flows north through Borysławka and flows opposite the Posada Rybotycka into the Wiar, a tributary of the San.
