= Borysławka =

- Village
- Interactive map of Borysławka
- Location within Poland
- Coordinates: 49°39′10.6″N 22°37′26.3″E
- Country: Poland
- Voivodeship: Subcarpathian
- County: Przemyśl
- Gmina: Fredropol

Borysławka [bɔrɨˈswafka] is a village in the administrative district of Gmina Fredropol, within Przemyśl County, Subcarpathian Voivodeship, in south-eastern Poland, close to the border with Ukraine.

== Geography ==
The Borysławka stream flows into the Wiar.

== History ==
The first mention of Borysławka dates back to 1494, when Jan Ryboticki received the village.

The Ukrainian population was deported and the village was burned in October 1945 as part of Operation Vistula by the Polish Home Army.

== Religion ==
- Church of Saint John the Baptist (1750; UGCC; wooden; destroyed in the 1940s)

== People from Borysławka ==
- Pavlo Vasylyk (1926—2004), Ukrainian Greek Catholic hierarch
