= Church of Saint John the Baptist, Borysławka =

Church in Subcarpathian Voivodeship, Poland

Church of Saint John the Baptist Cerkiew św. Jana Ewangelisty Церква Святого Івана Богослова
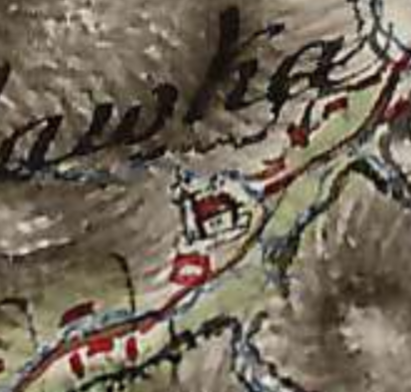
- Church of Saint John the Baptist in Borysławka on a topographical map by Friedrich von Mieg, late 18th century.

- Location within Subcarpathian Voivodeship

Religion
- Affiliation: Ukrainian Greek Catholic Church
- Ecclesiastical or organizational status: lost
- Year consecrated: 1750

Location
- Location: Borysławka
- Interactive map of Church of Saint John the Baptist; Cerkiew św. Jana Ewangelisty; Церква Святого Івана Богослова
- Coordinates: 49°39′01″N 22°37′14″E

The Church of Saint John the Baptist was a lost religious building, a wooden Ukrainian Greek Catholic Church in the former village of Borysławka, Przemyśl County, Lviv Voivodeship (now Gmina Fredropol, Przemyśl County, Podkarpackie Voivodeship, Poland).

== History ==
The parish church was first mentioned in 1510.

The outer church was built in 1750. Until 1847, the parish and the church were independent, and since 1840 they became subsidiaries of the church of the village of Posada Rybotycka.

Number of parishioners: 1840 — 569, 1879 — 540, 1926 — 745, 1859 — 538, 1899 — 660, 1938 — 785.

The church was destroyed after the eviction of Ukrainians from Borysławka.

Today, only the iron cross that crowned the church remains. Several tombstones have been preserved in the church cemetery.

== Priests ==
- vacant position ([1831—1835])
- о. Mykhailo Hrynda (1836—1838)
- vacant position ([1838—1842])
- о. Mykhailo Hrynda (1842—1844)
- о. Mykhailo Sozanskyi (1844—1845)
- о. Ivan Dolzhytskyi (1845—1847)
- о. Anun Bilynskyi (1886—1908+)
- о. Mykhailo Artemovych (1904—1908, assistant)
- о. Mykhailo Karpiak (1908—1909, administrator)
- о. Myroslav Lysiak (1909—1920)
- о. Mykhailo Tymchyshyn (1920—1927)
- о. Mykola Stsepanskyi (1927—1934)
- о. Semen Tymchuk (1935—1936, administrator)
- о. Pavlo Pavlis (1936—[1939])

== Gallery ==
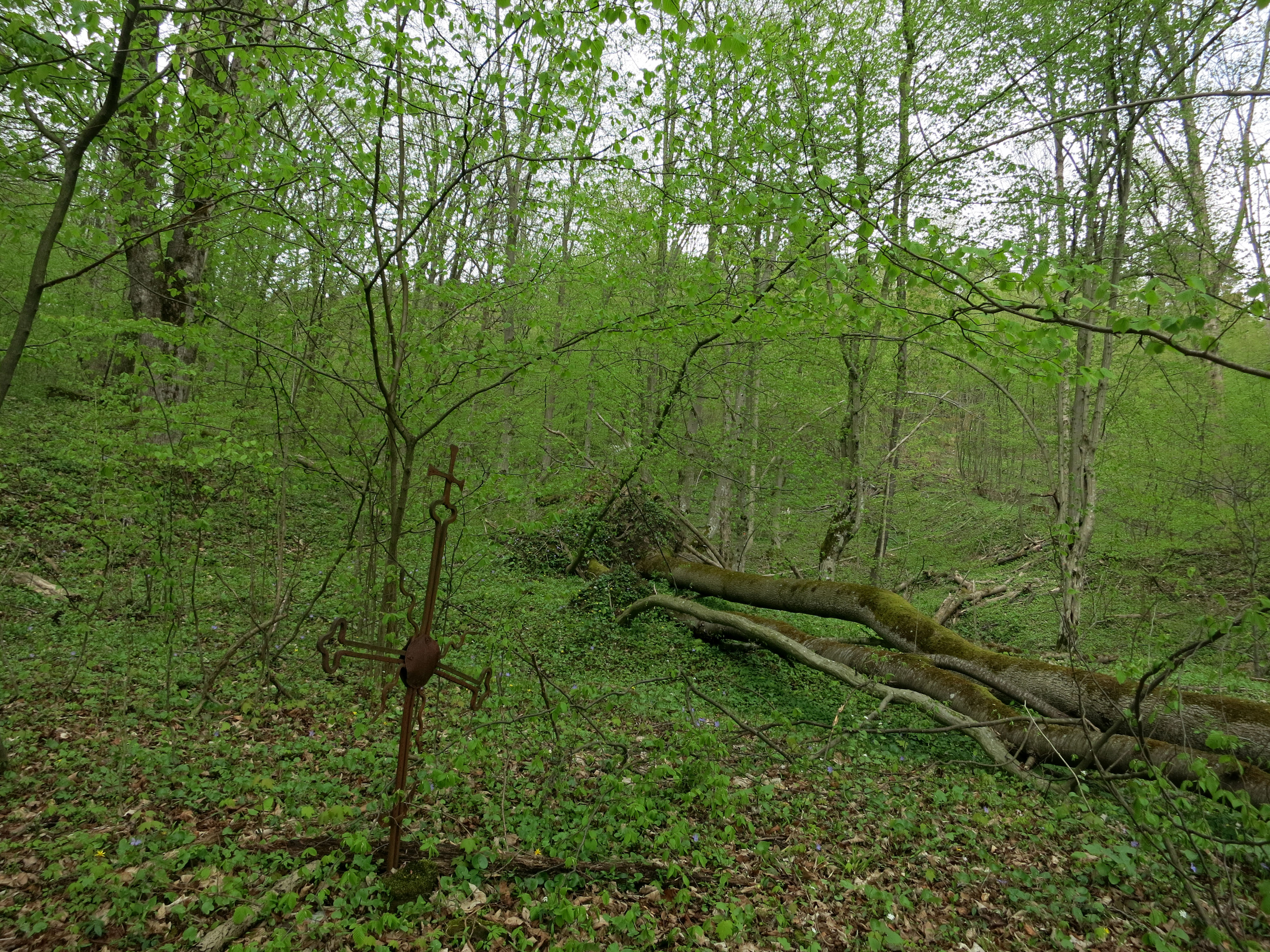
The cross that crowned the wooden church

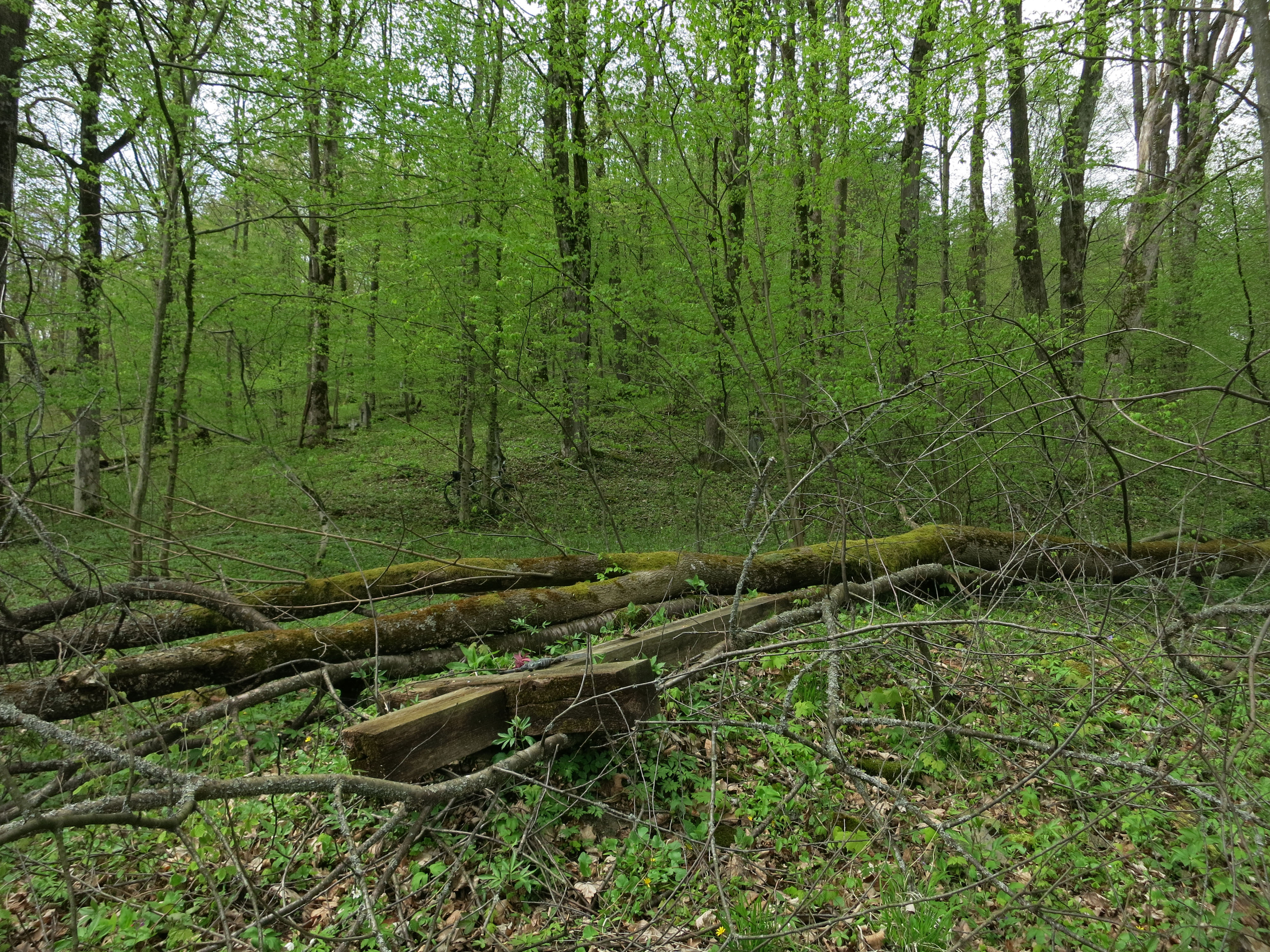
Church at the Greek Catholic cemetery

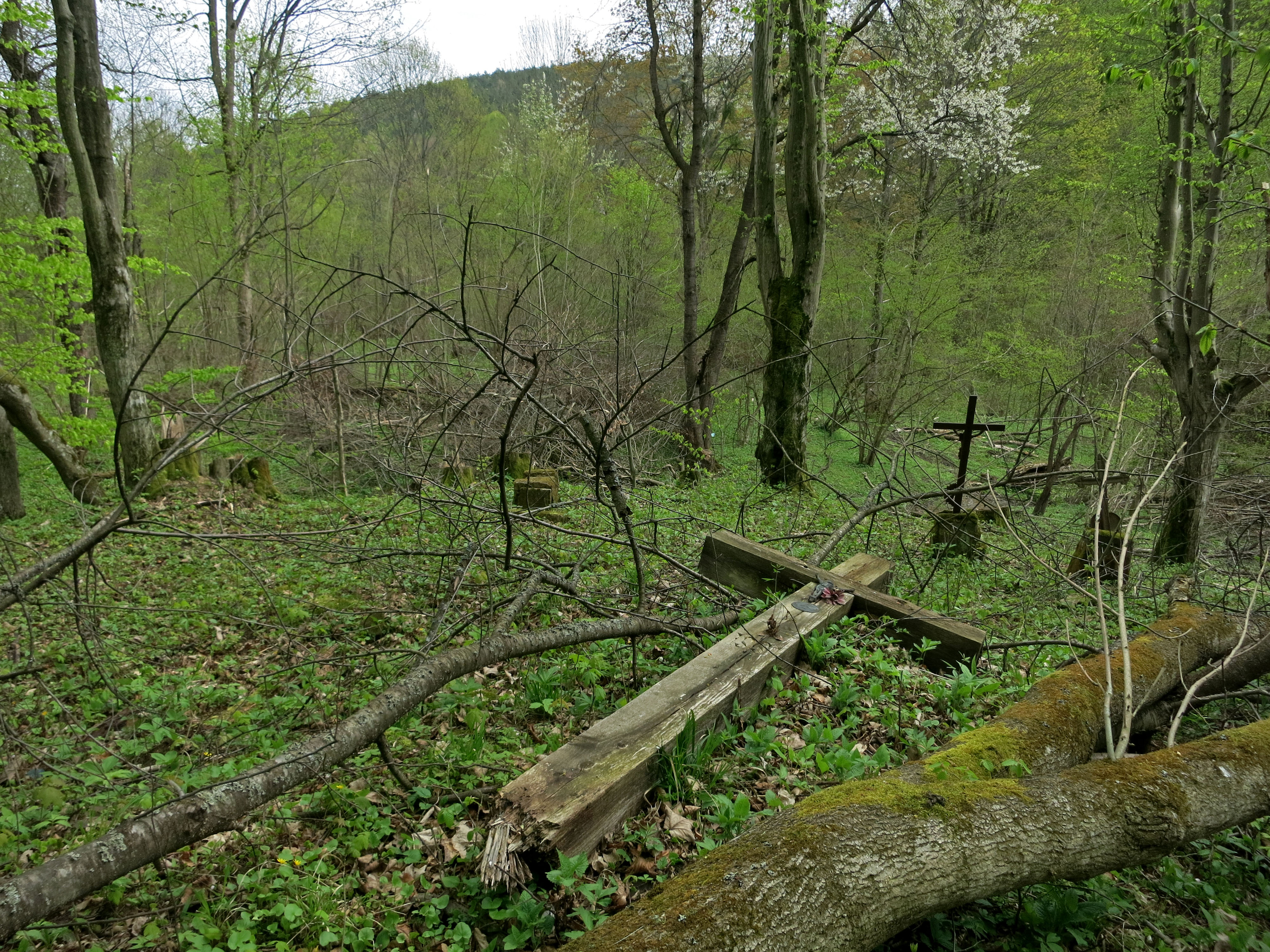
A cross at the Greek Catholic cemetery

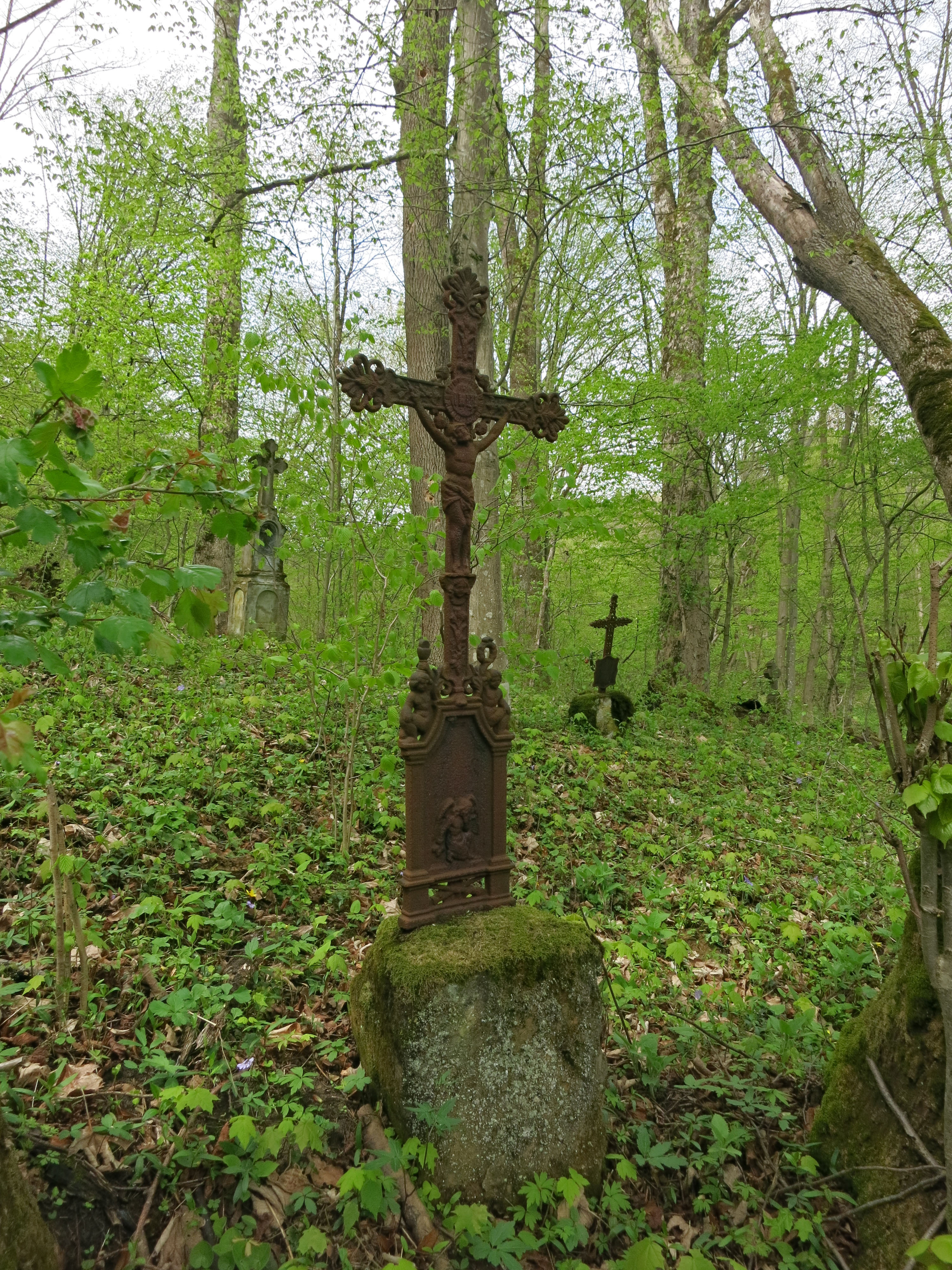
Tombstone at the Greek Catholic cemetery
