= Posada Rybotycka =

- Village
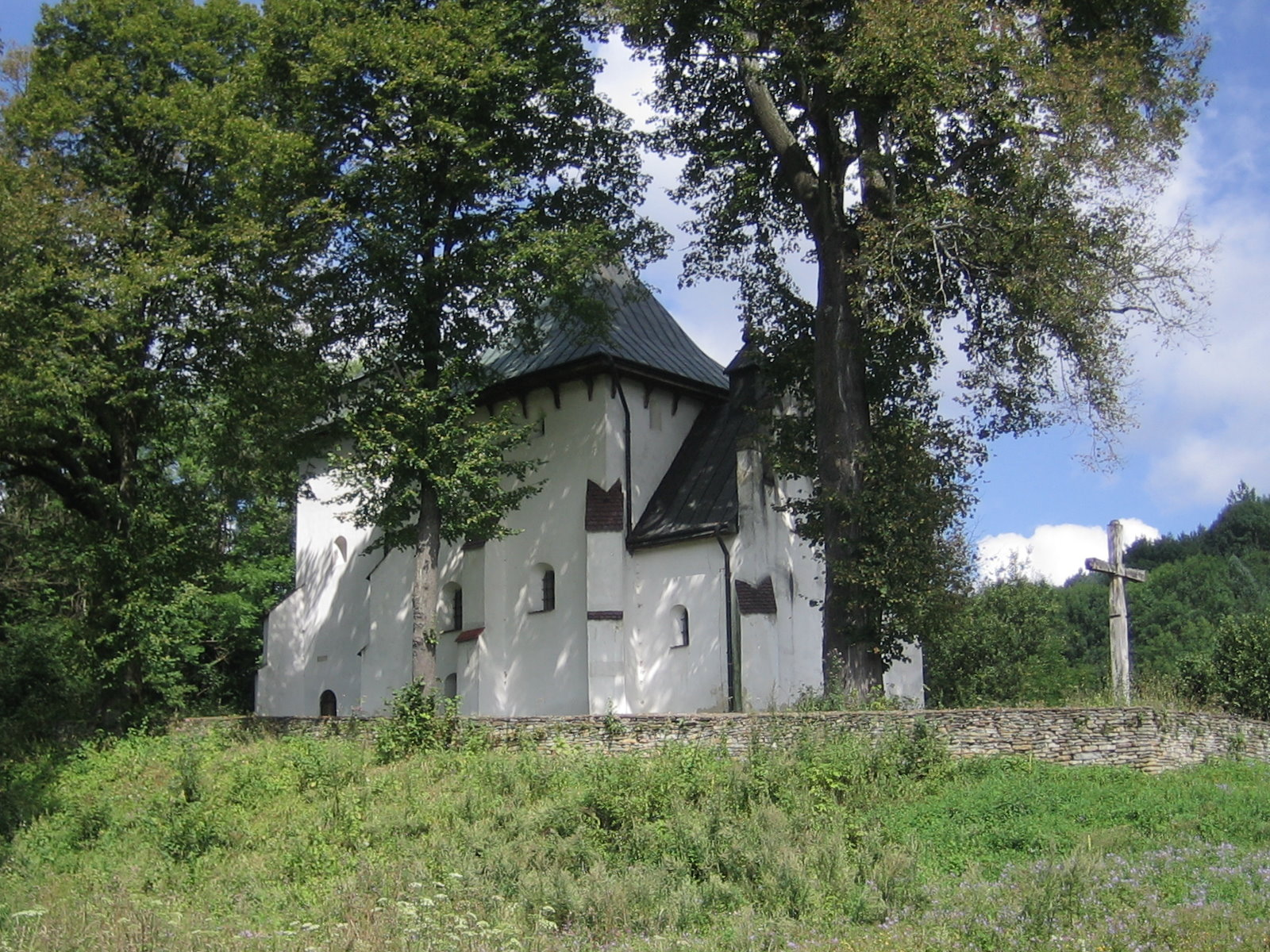
- Orthodox Saint Onuphrius church

- Location within Poland
- Coordinates: 49°40′N 22°37′E
- Country: Poland
- Voivodeship: Subcarpathian
- County: Przemyśl
- Gmina: Fredropol

Posada Rybotycka [pɔˈsada rɨbɔˈtɨt͡ska] is a village in the administrative district of Gmina Fredropol, within Przemyśl County, Subcarpathian Voivodeship, in south-eastern Poland, close to the border with Ukraine.
