= Wiar =

Wiar Вігор
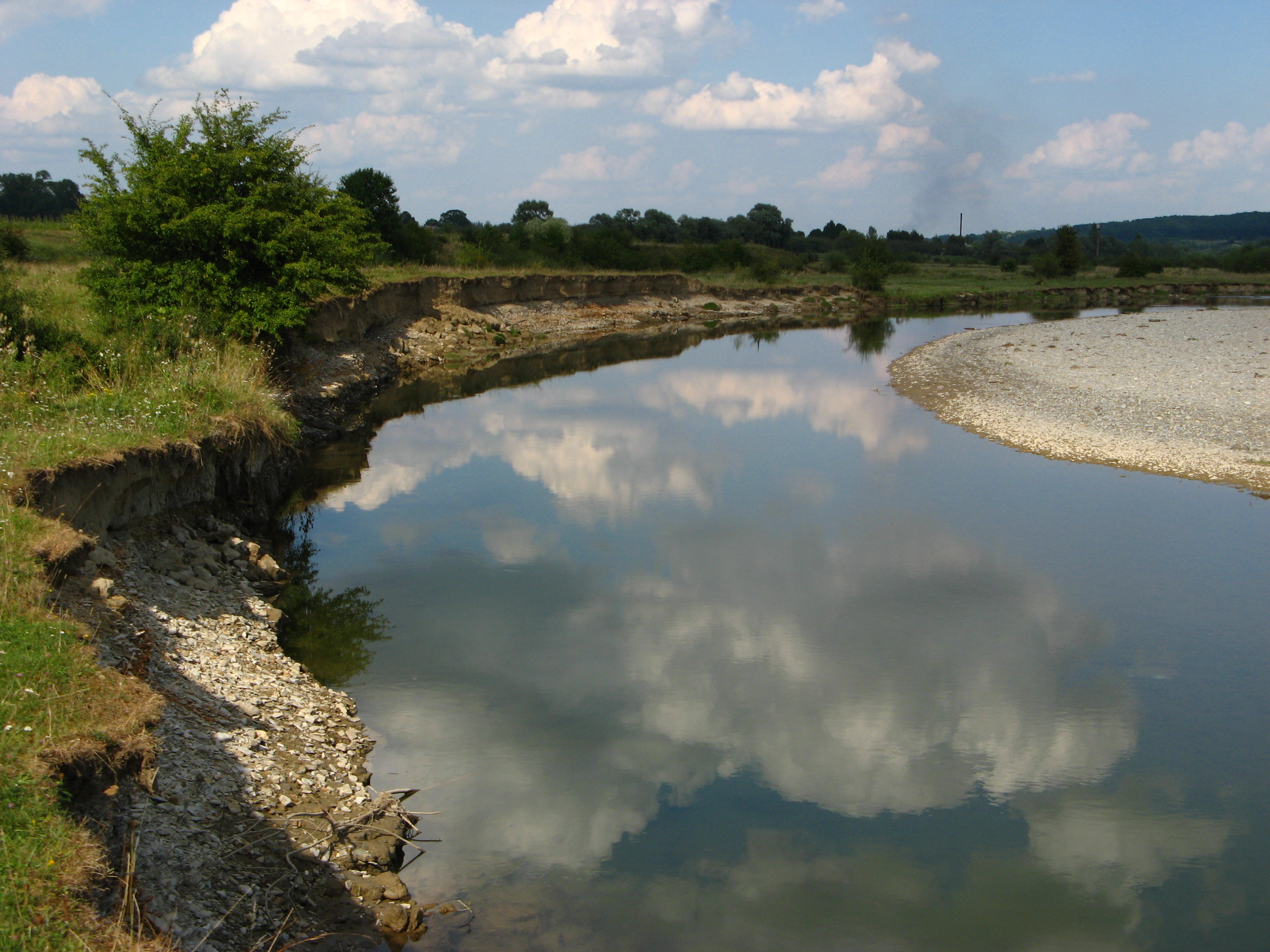
- The Wiar River near Nyzhankovychi

Location
- Country: Poland, Ukraine

Physical characteristics
- Source: Mount Brańcowa
  - location: Jureczkowa, Bieszczady County, Subcarpathian Voivodeship, Poland
  - elevation: 620 m (2,030 ft)
- Mouth: San
  - location: Przemyśl, Subcarpathian Voivodeship, Poland
  - coordinates: 49°47′32″N 22°49′32″E
- Length: 70.4 km (43.7 mi)
- Basin size: 798.2 km^{2} (308.2 sq mi)
- Discharge
  - average: 6 m^{3}/s (210 cu ft/s)

Basin features
- Tributaries
  - left: Zalissia River
  - right: Bibiska; Mala Vyrva; Bukhta; Vyrva
- Progression: San→ Vistula→ Baltic Sea

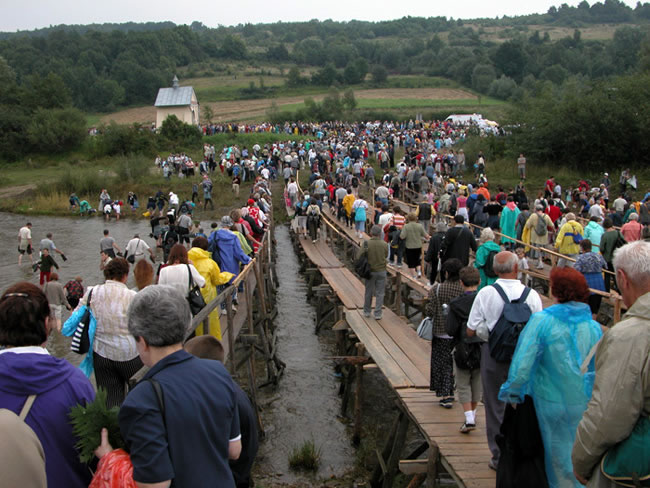
Kalwaria Pacławska, Poland

Wiar or Vihor (Ukrainian: Вігор) is a left tributary of the San River in southeastern Poland and Ukraine. It flows for 70.4 kilometres, and joins the San near Przemyśl.

== Tributaries ==
Left

- Zalissia River

Right

- Bibiska
- Mala Vyrva
- Bukhta
- Vyrva
  - Arlamivka (left)
  - Chyzhka (right)
