= August 2008 lunar eclipse =

Partial eclipse

- Partial eclipse
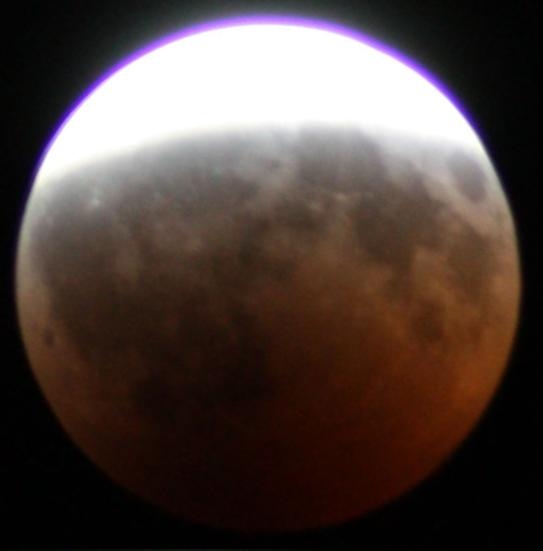
- Partiality as viewed from Cape Town, South Africa.
- Date: August 16, 2008
- Gamma: 0.5646
- Magnitude: 0.8095
- Saros cycle: 138 (28 of 82)
- Partiality: 188 minutes, 8 seconds
- Penumbral: 330 minutes, 31 seconds
Contacts (UTC)
- P1: 18:24:50
- U1: 19:36:05
- Greatest: 21:10:06
- U4: 22:44:13
- P4: 23:55:21

A partial lunar eclipse occurred at the Moon’s ascending node of orbit on Saturday, August 16, 2008, with an umbral magnitude of 0.8095. A lunar eclipse occurs when the Moon moves into the Earth's shadow, causing the Moon to be darkened. A partial lunar eclipse occurs when one part of the Moon is in the Earth's umbra, while the other part is in the Earth's penumbra. Unlike a solar eclipse, which can only be viewed from a relatively small area of the world, a lunar eclipse may be viewed from anywhere on the night side of Earth. Occurring about 6.2 days before apogee (on August 10, 2008, at 16:20 UTC), the Moon's apparent diameter was smaller.

== Visibility ==
The eclipse was completely visible over Africa, Europe, Antarctica, and west, central, and south Asia, seen rising over South America and setting over east Asia and Australia.

The planet Neptune was 2 days past opposition, visible in binoculars as an 8th magnitude "star" just two degrees west and slightly south of the Moon.

Hourly motion shown right to left	The Moon's hourly motion across the Earth's shadow in the constellation of Capricornus.
Visibility map

== Images ==
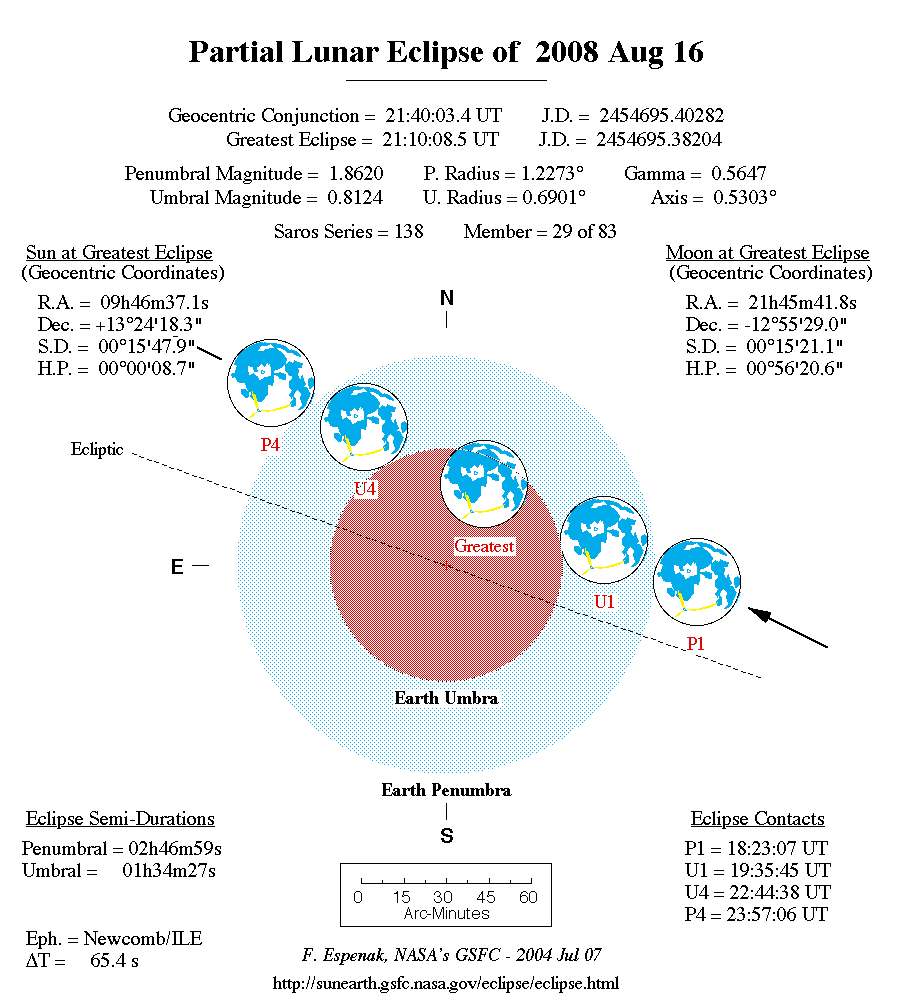
NASA chart of the eclipse

== Gallery ==
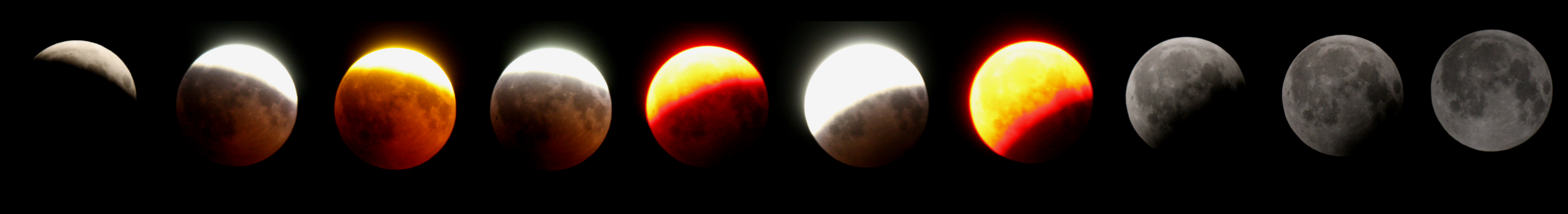
Progression from Oslo, Norway

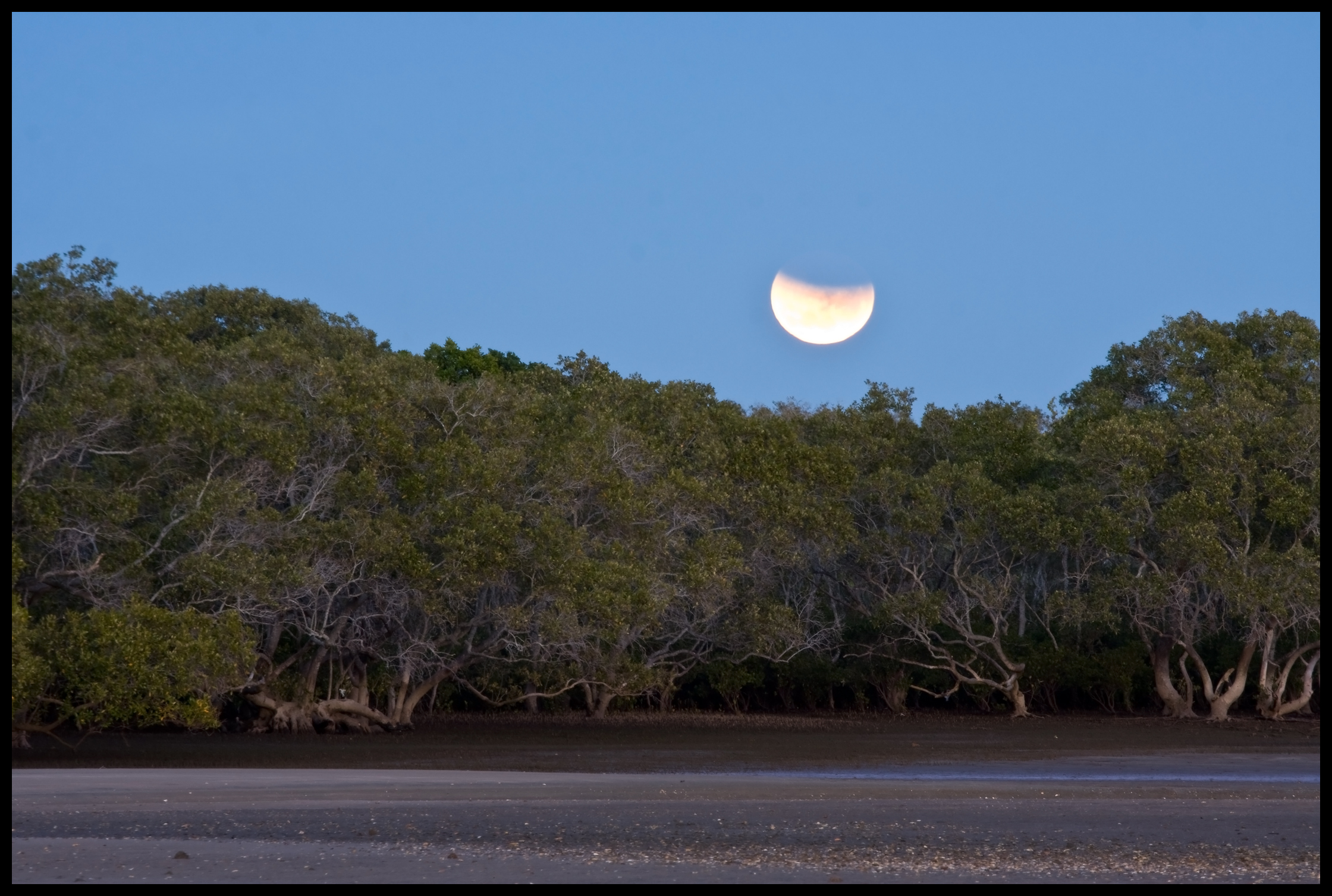
Brighton, Queensland, 20:03 UTC

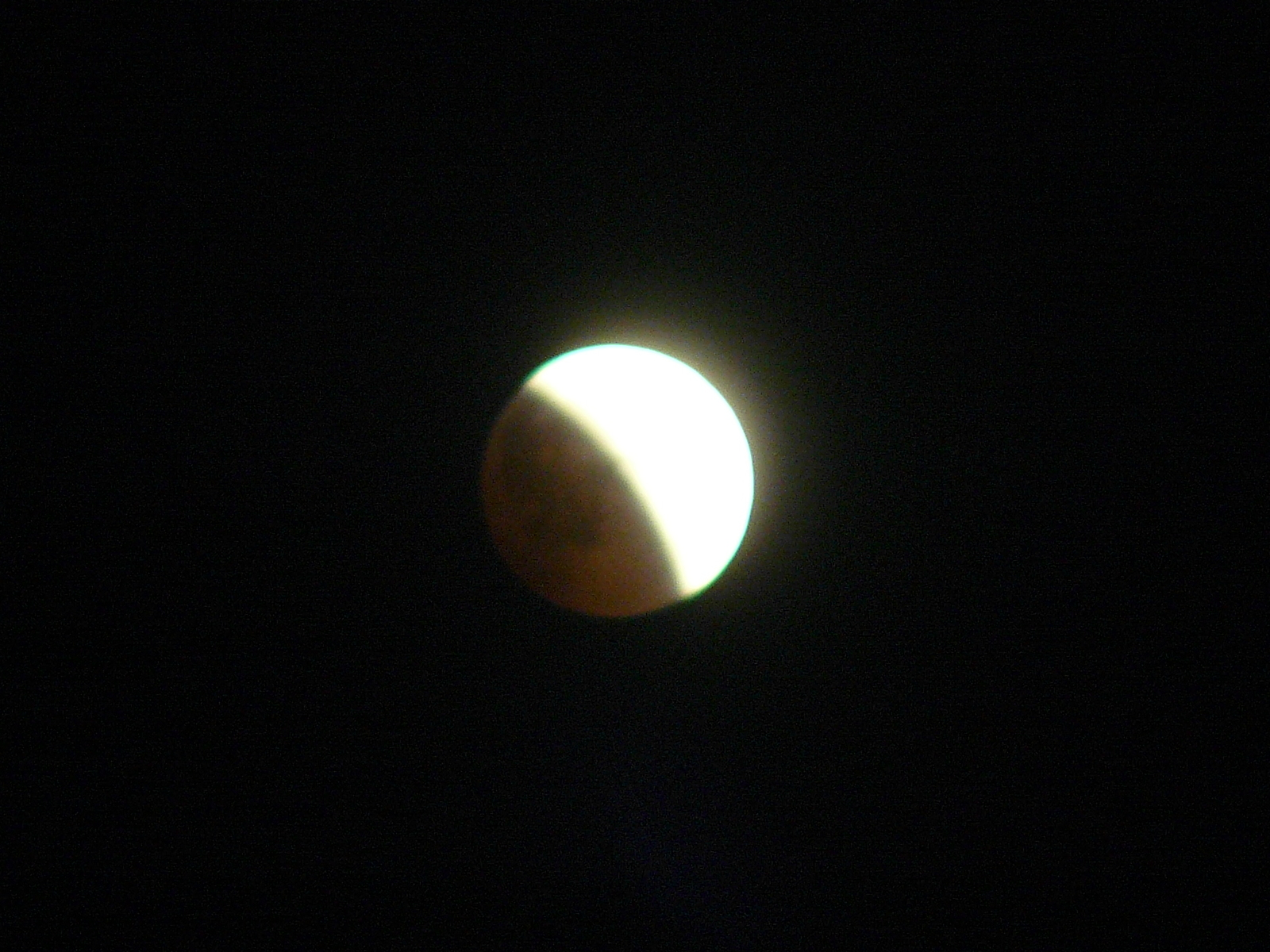
Ruzsky District, Russia, 20:21 UTC

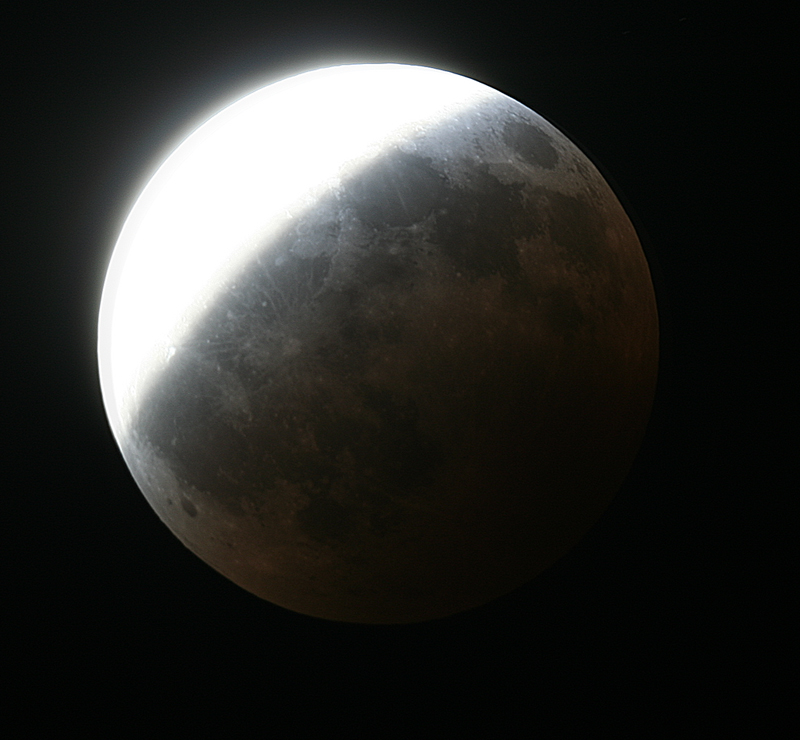
Palinuro, Italy, 20:31 UTC

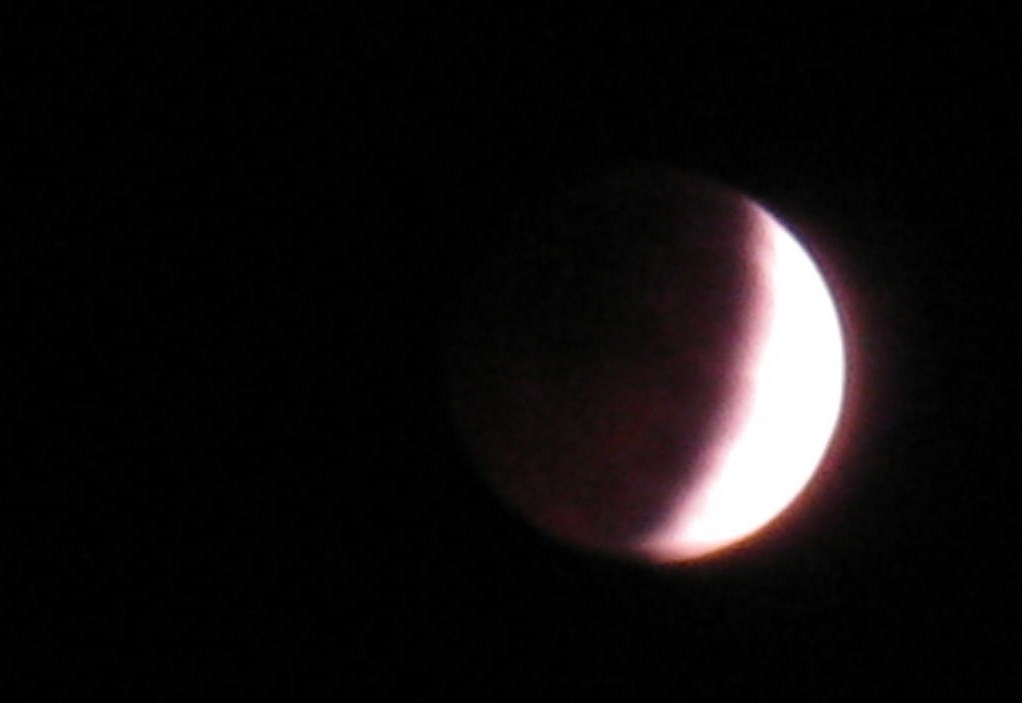
Tel Aviv, Israel, 20:43 UTC

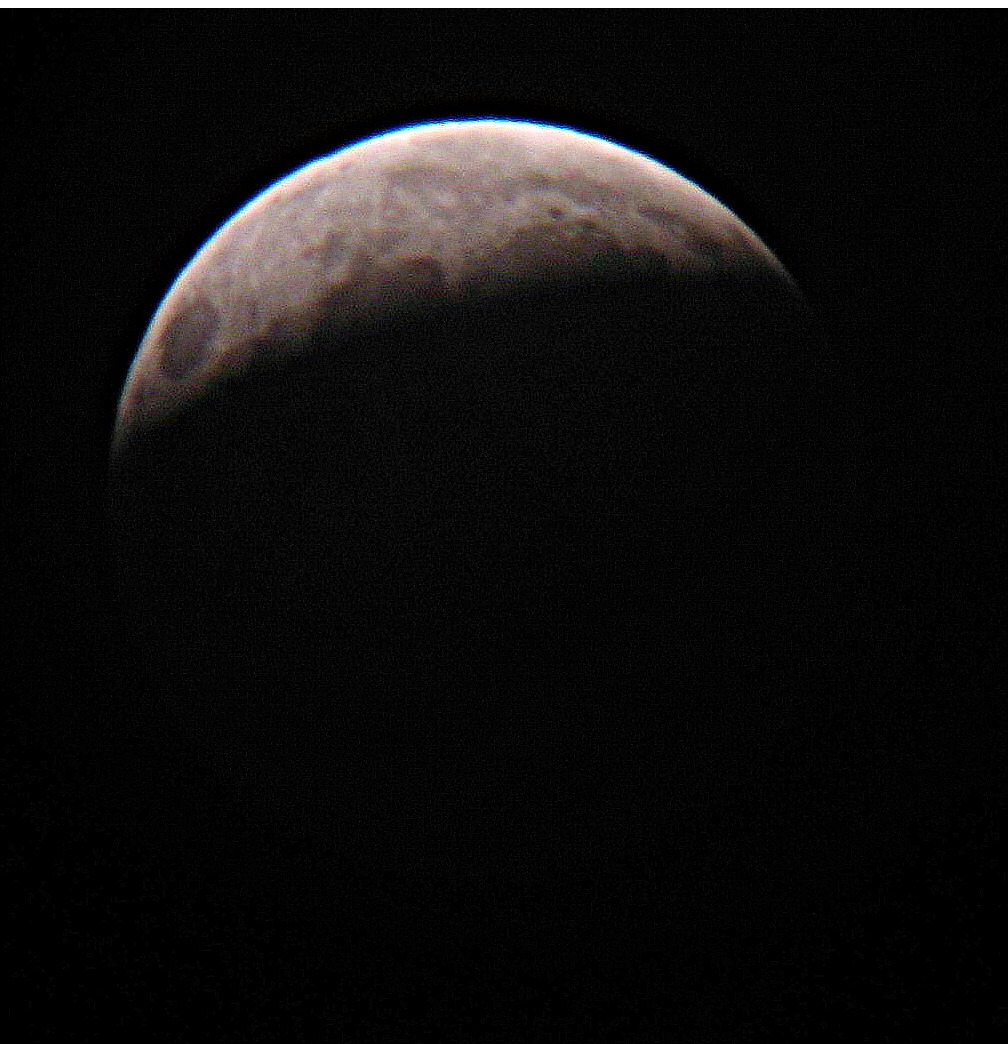
Groningen, Netherlands, 20:50 UTC

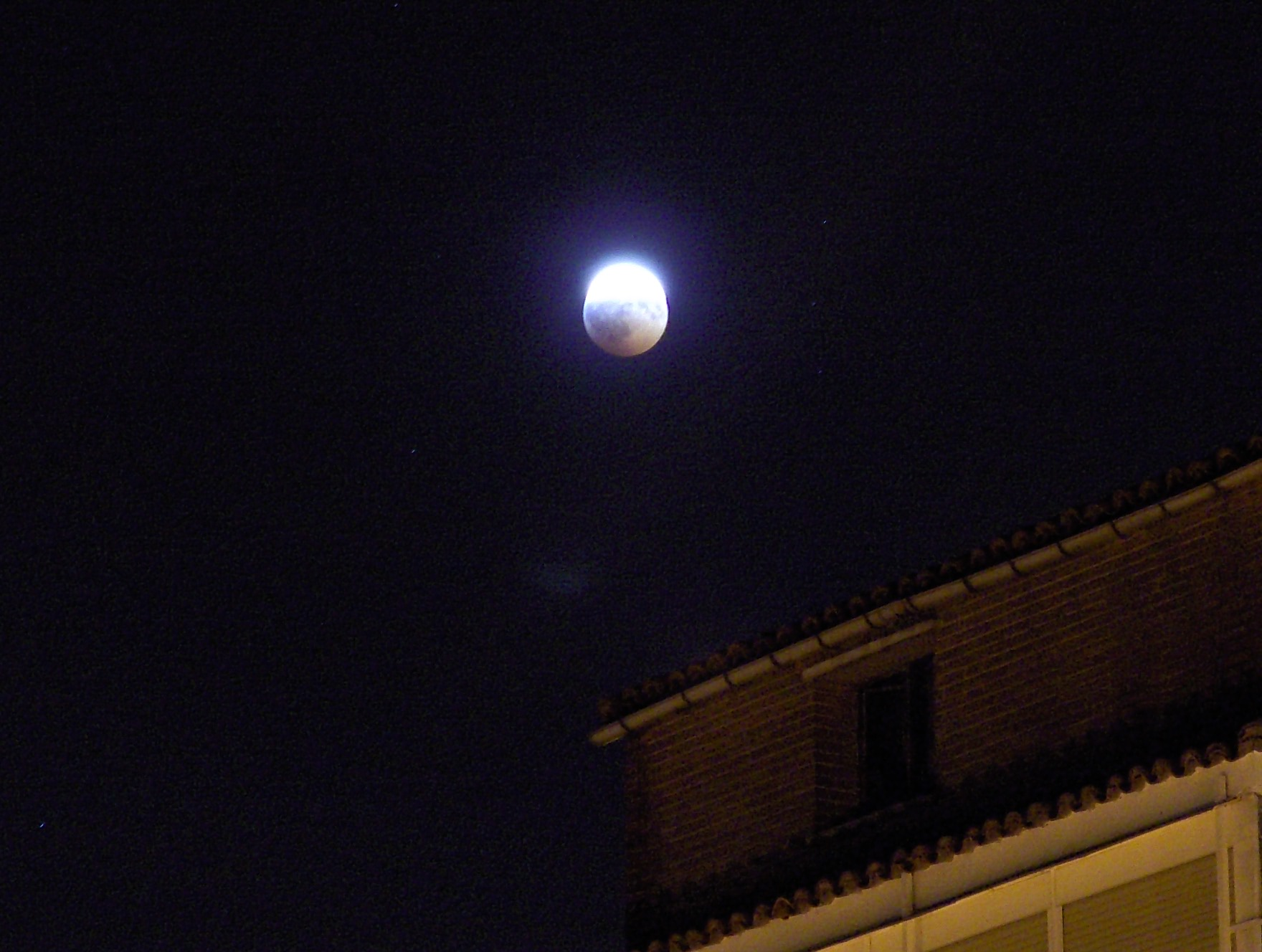
Madrid, Spain, 20:53 UTC

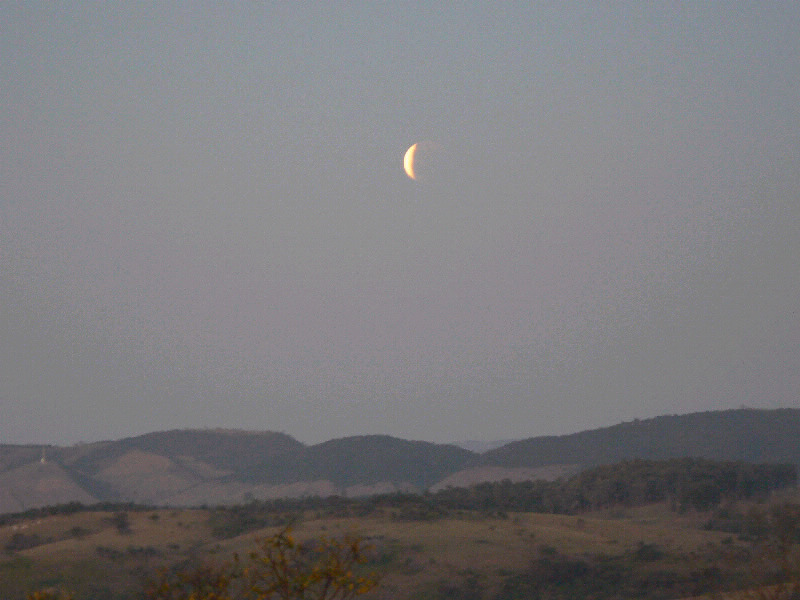
Jaguariúna, Brazil, 21:00 UTC

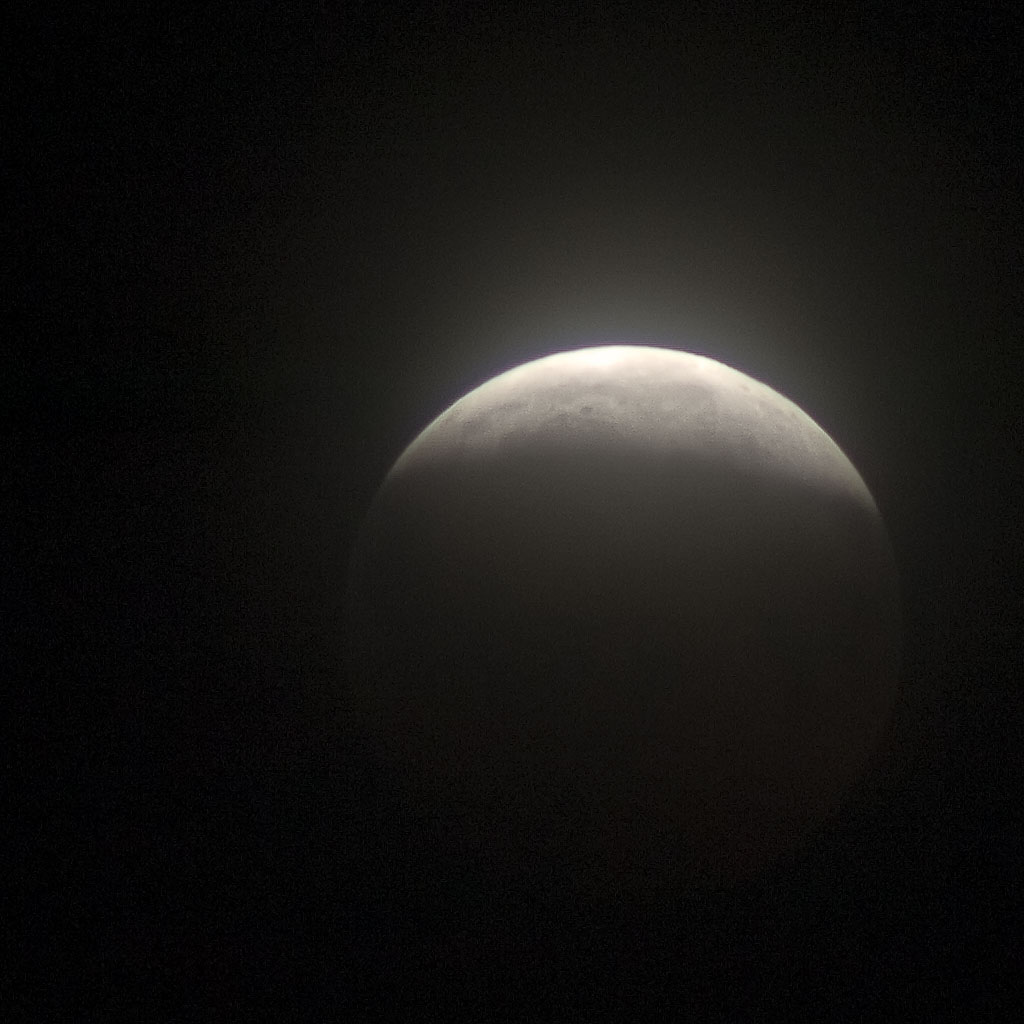
Zürich, Switzerland, 21:06 UTC

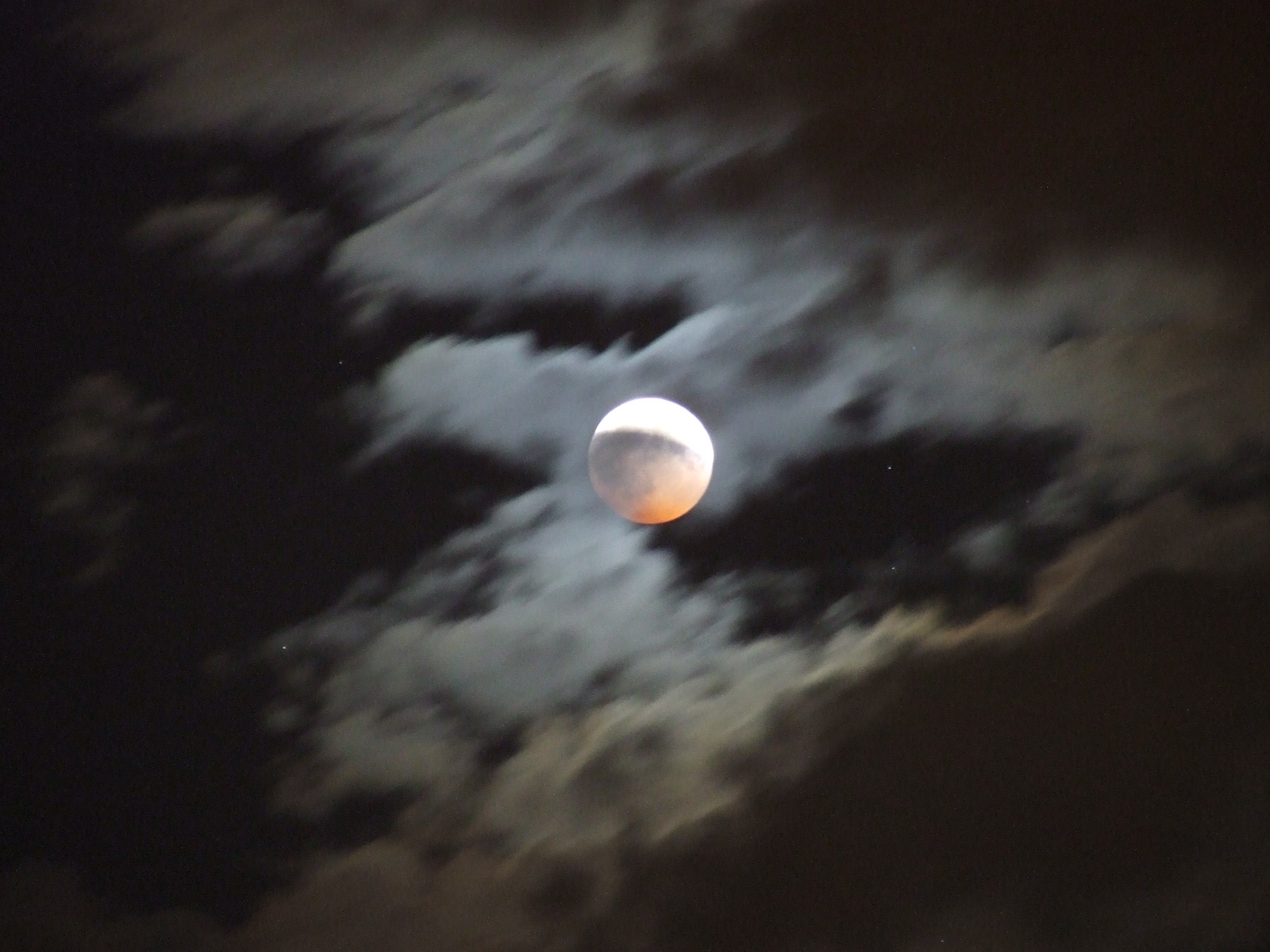
Toulouse, France, 21:07 UTC

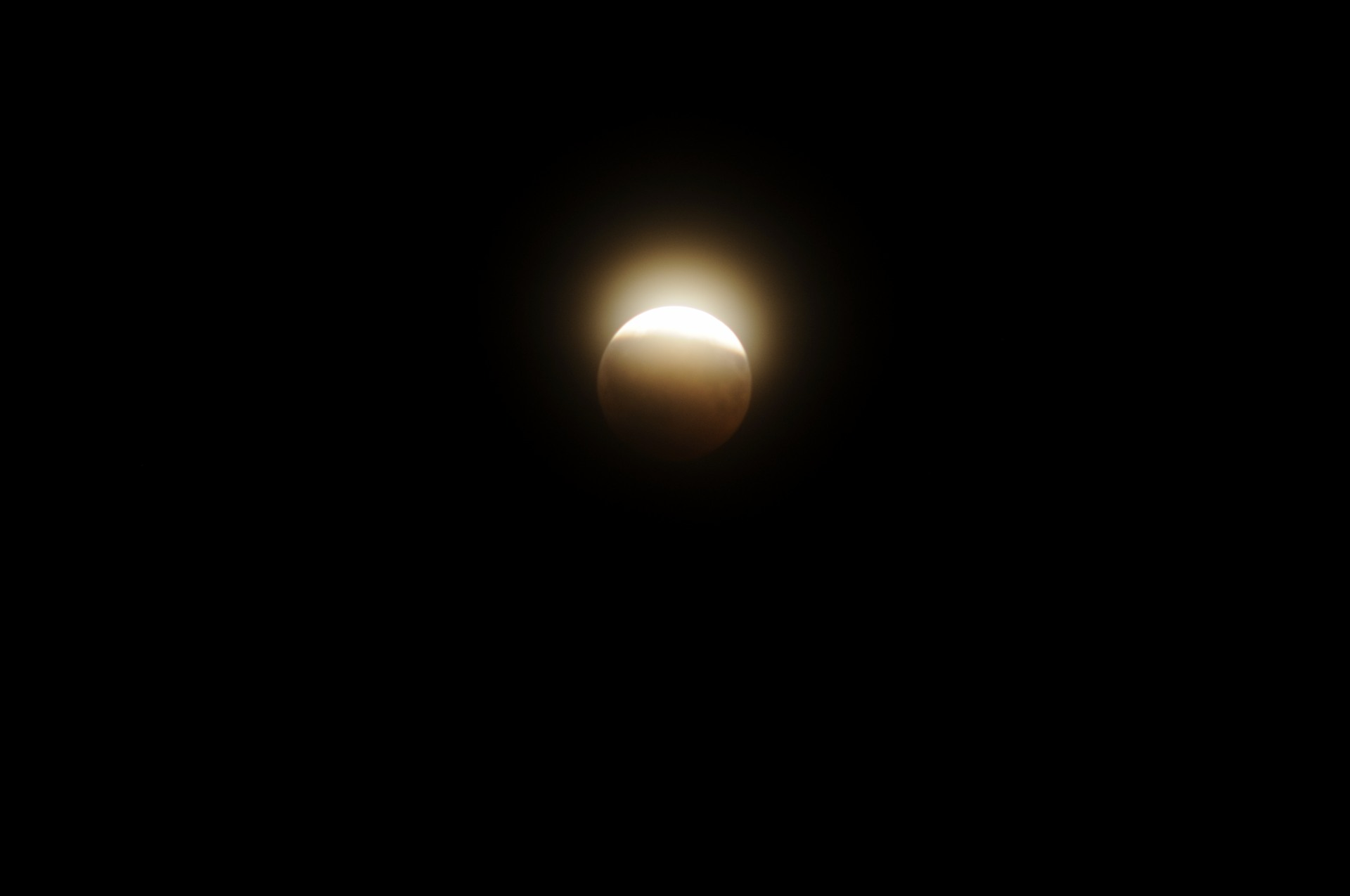
Solna, Sweden, 21:09 UTC

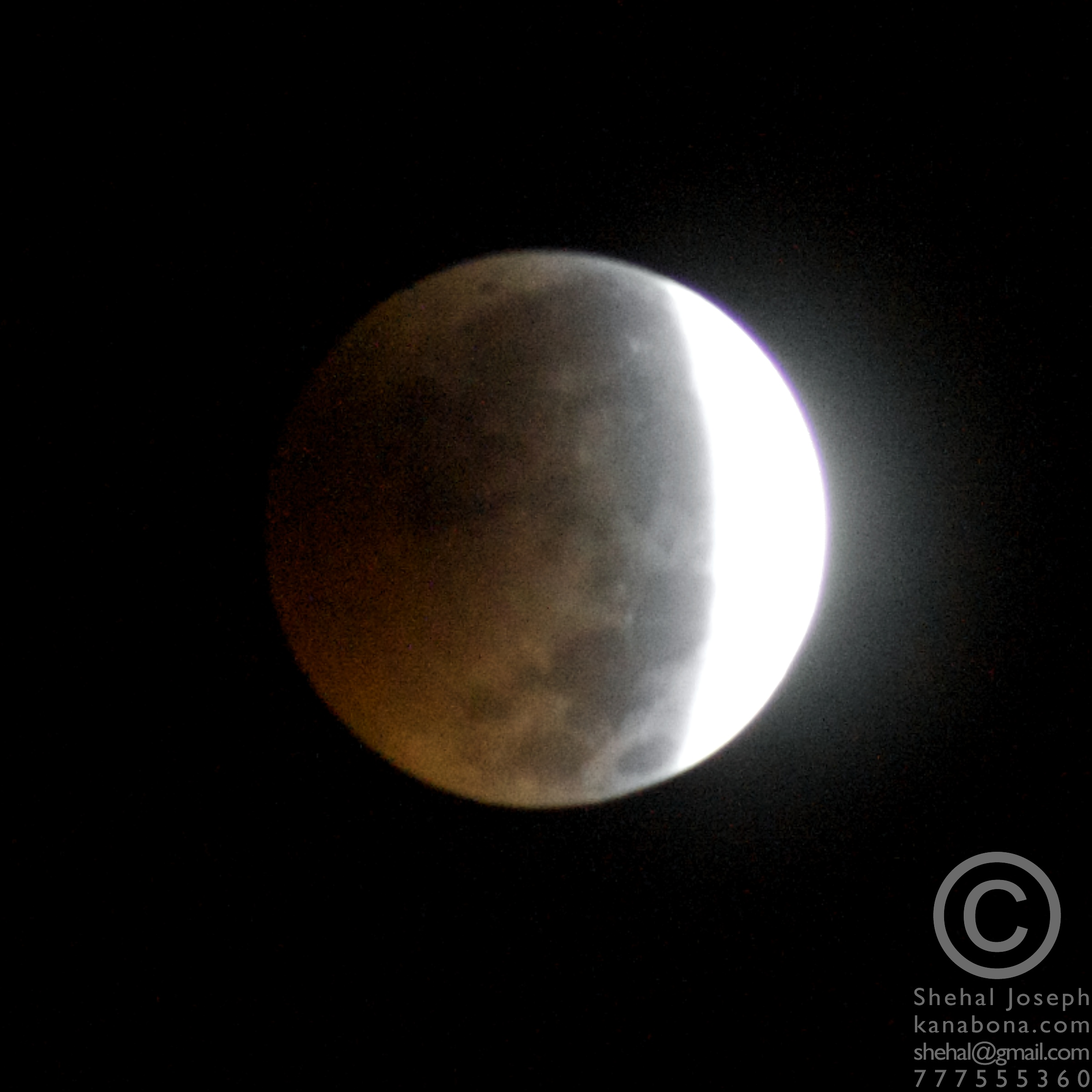
Boralesgamuwa, Sri Lanka, 21:12 UTC

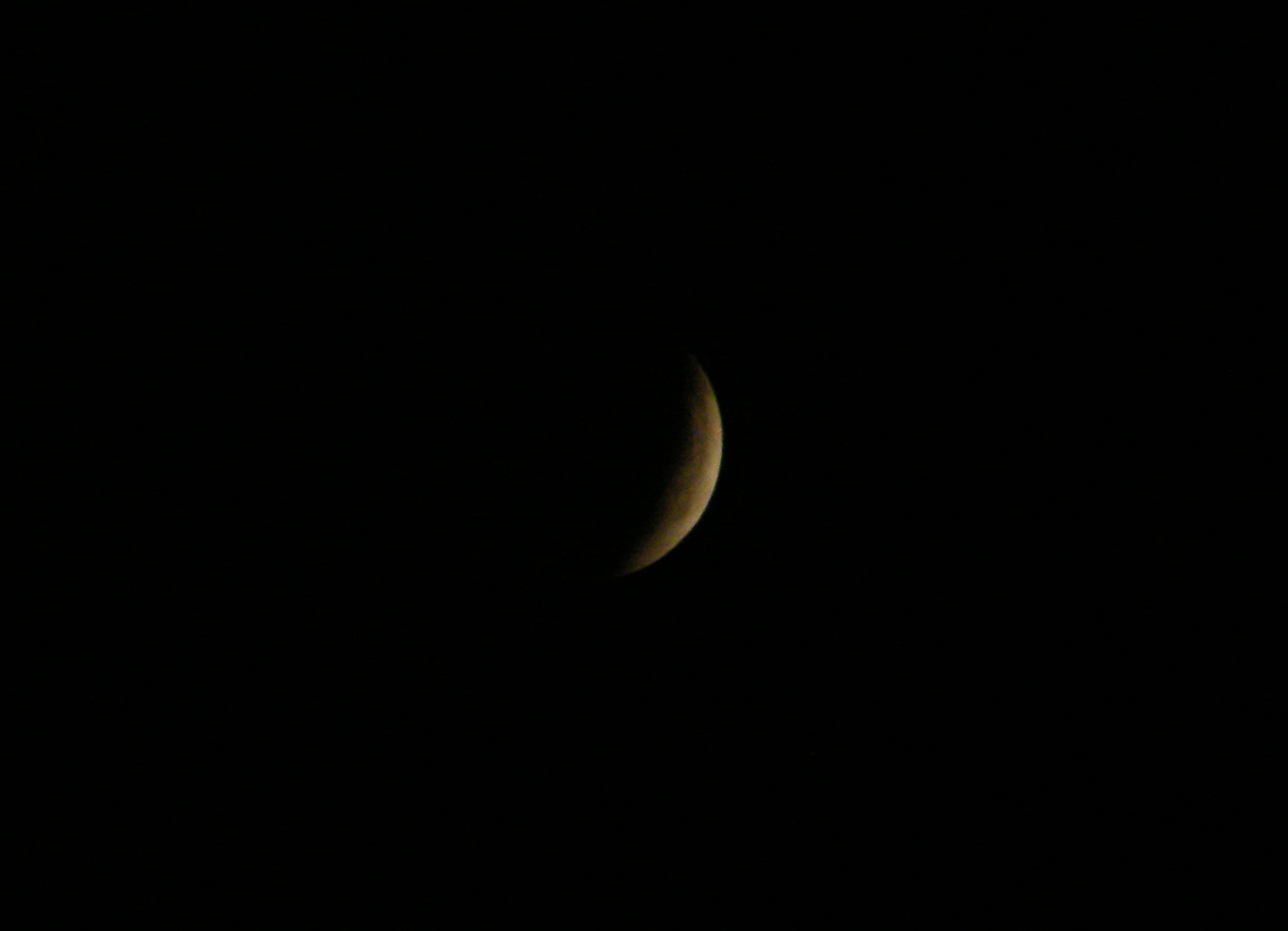
Johor Bahru, Malaysia, 21:15 UTC

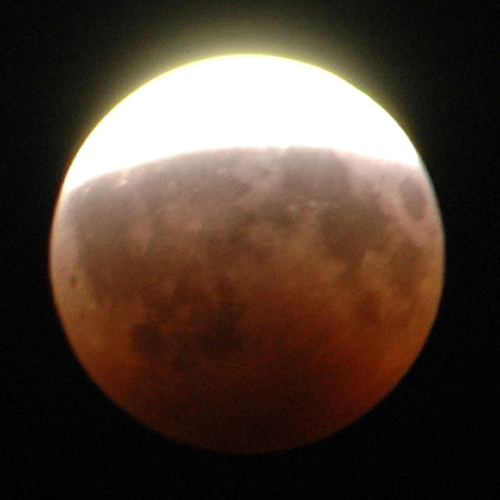
Langenbernsdorf, Germany, 21:23 UTC

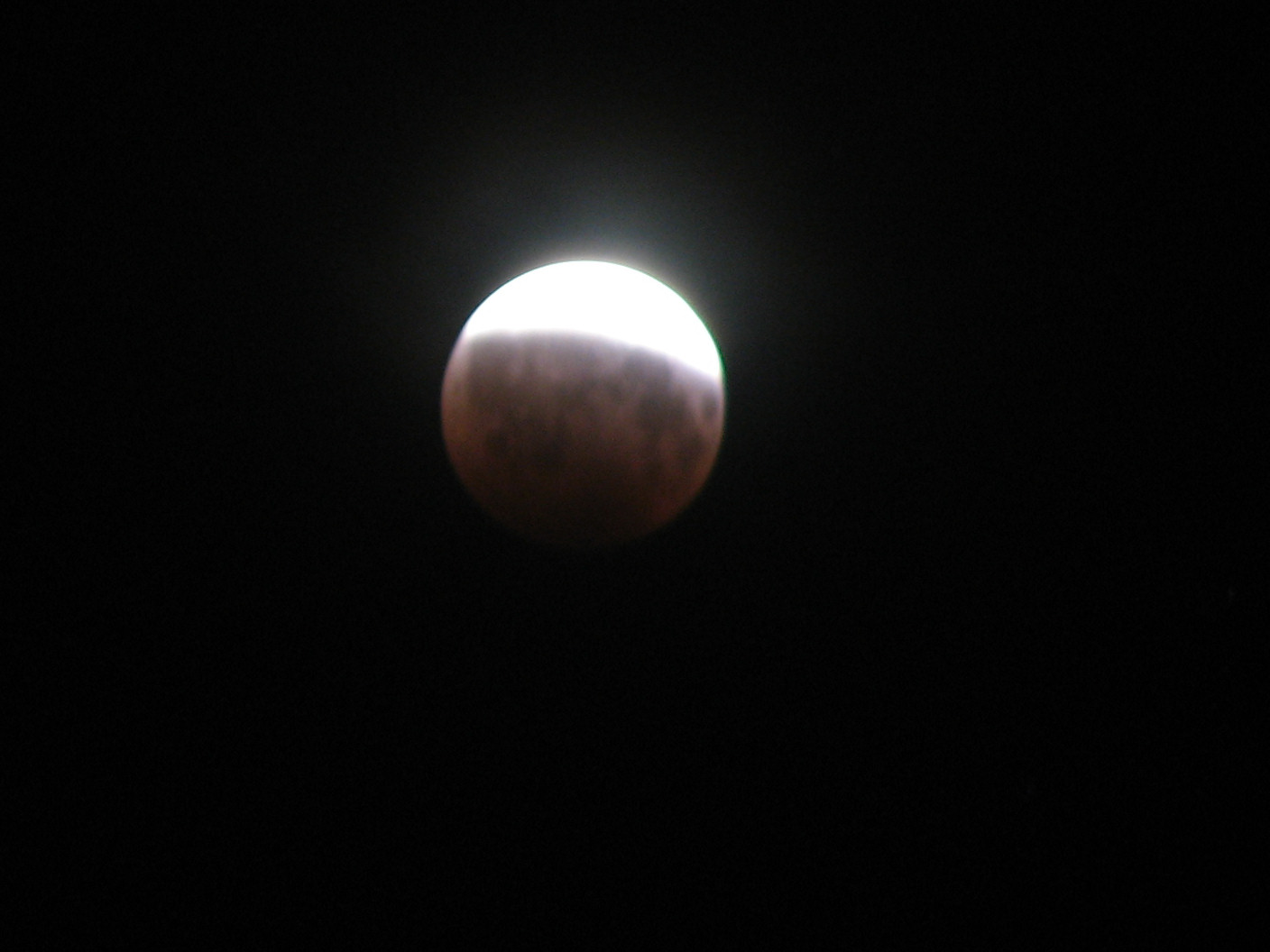
Bucharest, Romania, 21:27 UTC

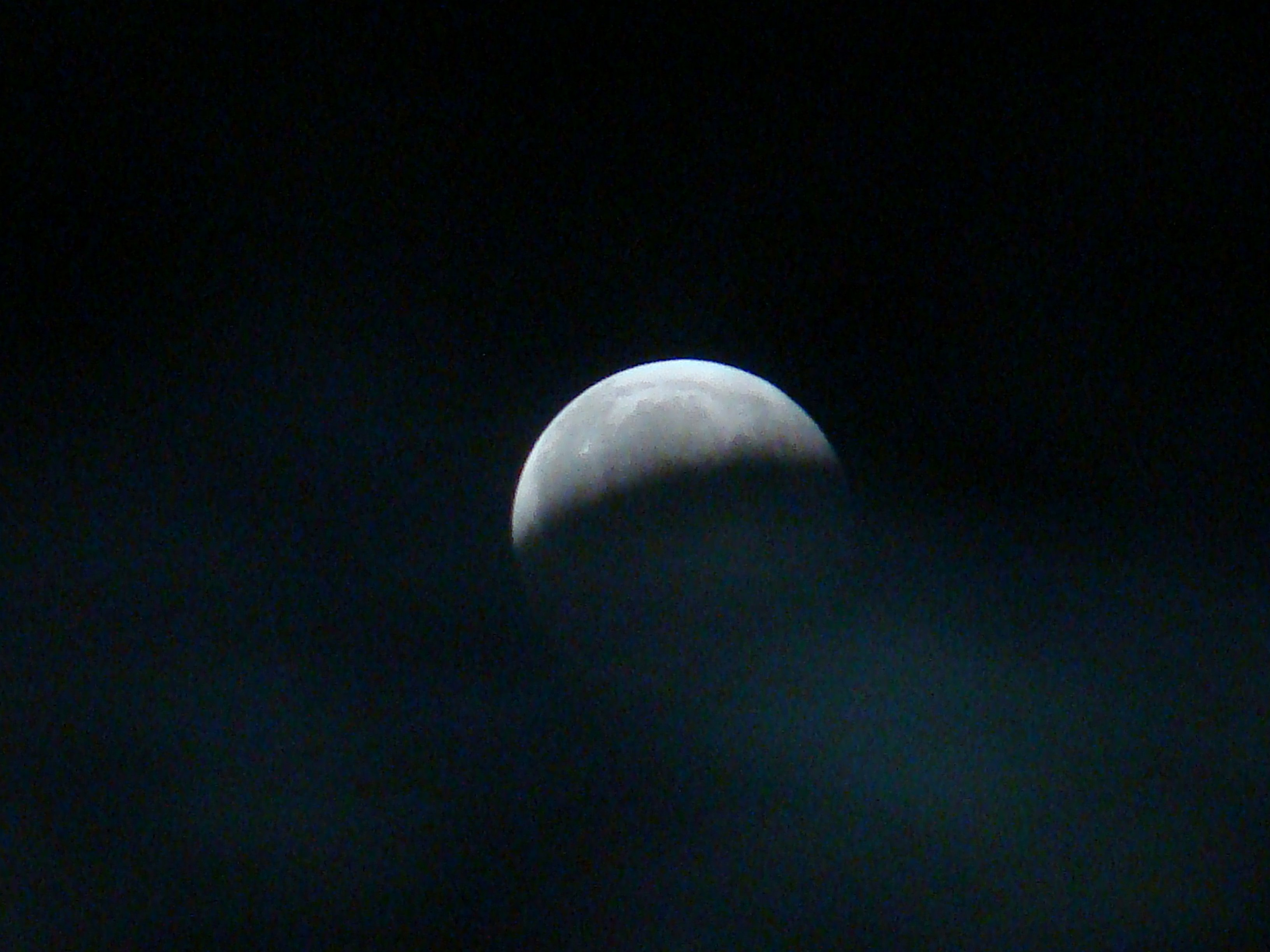
Rozbórz Długi, Poland, 21:45 UTC

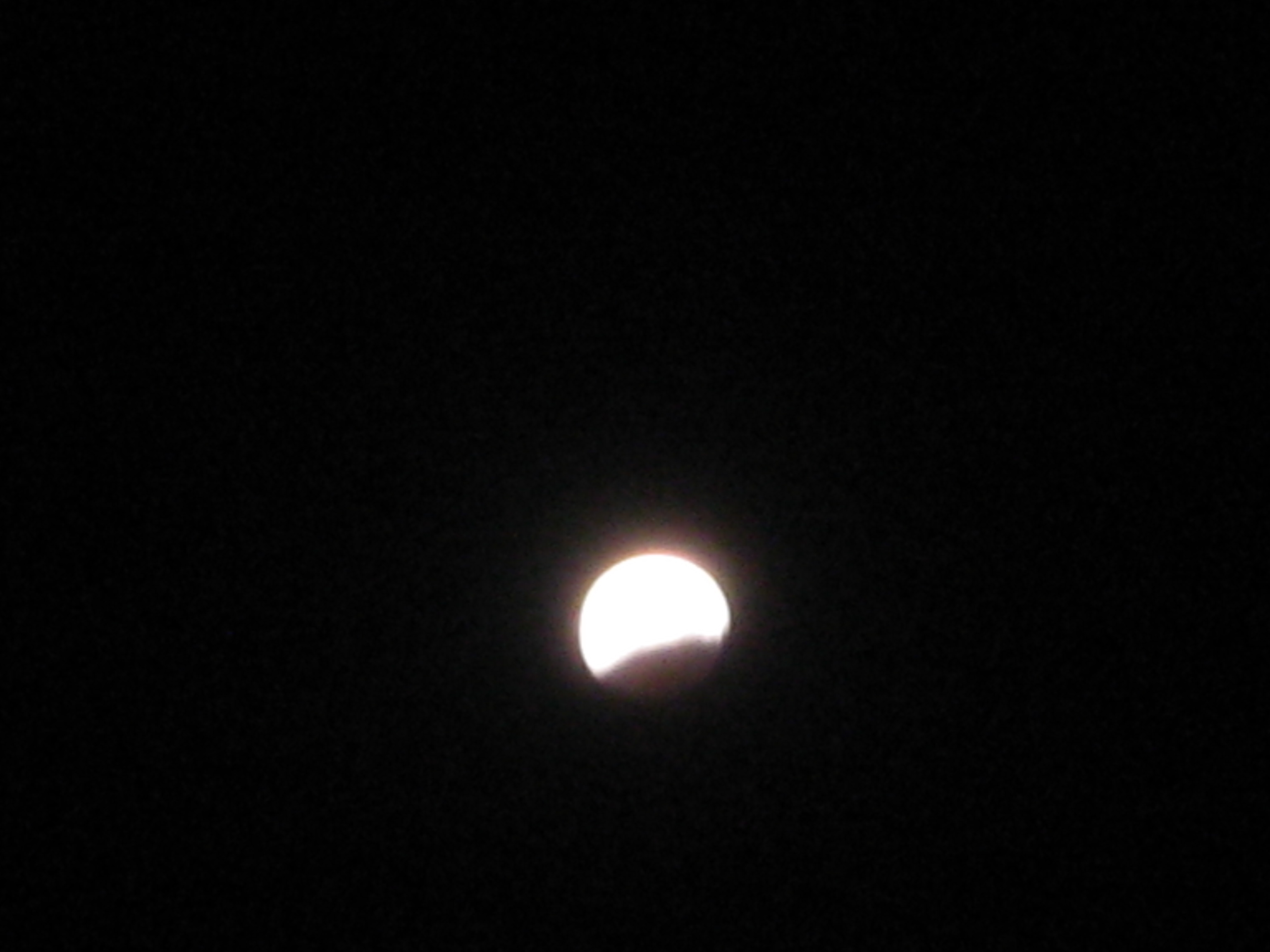
Nasr City, Egypt, 22:12 UTC

== Eclipse details ==
Shown below is a table displaying details about this particular lunar eclipse. It describes various parameters pertaining to this eclipse.

August 16, 2008 Lunar Eclipse Parameters
Parameter	Value
Penumbral Magnitude	1.83849
Umbral Magnitude	0.80946
Gamma	0.56463
Sun Right Ascension	09h46m37.2s
Sun Declination	+13°24'18.2"
Sun Semi-Diameter	15'47.9"
Sun Equatorial Horizontal Parallax	08.7"
Moon Right Ascension	21h45m41.8s
Moon Declination	-12°55'29.2"
Moon Semi-Diameter	15'21.1"
Moon Equatorial Horizontal Parallax	0°56'20.6"
ΔT	65.7 s

== Eclipse season ==
This eclipse is part of an eclipse season, a period, roughly every six months, when eclipses occur. Only two (or occasionally three) eclipse seasons occur each year, and each season lasts about 35 days and repeats just short of six months (173 days) later; thus two full eclipse seasons always occur each year. Either two or three eclipses happen each eclipse season. In the sequence below, each eclipse is separated by a fortnight.

Eclipse season of August 2008
August 1 Descending node (new moon)	August 16 Ascending node (full moon)
Total solar eclipse Solar Saros 126	Partial lunar eclipse Lunar Saros 138

== Related eclipses ==
=== Eclipses in 2008 ===
- An annular solar eclipse on February 7.
- A total lunar eclipse on February 21.
- A total solar eclipse on August 1.
- A partial lunar eclipse on August 16.

=== Metonic ===
- Preceded by: Lunar eclipse of October 28, 2004
- Followed by: Lunar eclipse of June 4, 2012

=== Tzolkinex ===
- Preceded by: Lunar eclipse of July 5, 2001
- Followed by: Lunar eclipse of September 28, 2015

=== Half-Saros ===
- Preceded by: Solar eclipse of August 11, 1999
- Followed by: Solar eclipse of August 21, 2017

=== Tritos ===
- Preceded by: Lunar eclipse of September 16, 1997
- Followed by: Lunar eclipse of July 16, 2019

=== Lunar Saros 138 ===
- Preceded by: Lunar eclipse of August 6, 1990
- Followed by: Lunar eclipse of August 28, 2026

=== Inex ===
- Preceded by: Lunar eclipse of September 6, 1979
- Followed by: Lunar eclipse of July 27, 2037

=== Triad ===
- Preceded by: Lunar eclipse of October 16, 1921
- Followed by: Lunar eclipse of June 17, 2095

=== Lunar eclipses of 2006–2009 ===
This eclipse is a member of a semester series. An eclipse in a semester series of lunar eclipses repeats approximately every 177 days and 4 hours (a semester) at alternating nodes of the Moon's orbit.

The lunar eclipses on July 7, 2009 (penumbral) and December 31, 2009 (partial) occur in the next lunar year eclipse set.

Lunar eclipse series sets from 2006 to 2009
Descending node				Ascending node			
Saros	Date Viewing	Type Chart	Gamma	Saros	Date Viewing	Type Chart	Gamma
113	2006 Mar 14	Penumbral	1.0211	118	2006 Sep 7	Partial	−0.9262
123	2007 Mar 03	Total	0.3175	128	2007 Aug 28	Total	−0.2146
133	2008 Feb 21	Total	−0.3992	138	2008 Aug 16	Partial	0.5646
143	2009 Feb 09	Penumbral	−1.0640	148	2009 Aug 06	Penumbral	1.3572

=== Metonic series ===
The Metonic cycle repeats nearly exactly every 19 years and represents a Saros cycle plus one lunar year. Because it occurs on the same calendar date, the Earth's shadow will in nearly the same location relative to the background stars.

Metonic lunar eclipse sets 1951–2027
Descending node			Ascending node		
Saros	Date	Type	Saros	Date	Type
103	1951 Feb 21.88	Penumbral	108	1951 Aug 17.13	Penumbral
113	1970 Feb 21.35	Partial	118	1970 Aug 17.14	Partial
123	1989 Feb 20.64	Total	128	1989 Aug 17.13	Total
133	2008 Feb 21.14	Total	138	2008 Aug 16.88	Partial
143	2027 Feb 20.96	Penumbral	148	2027 Aug 17.30	Penumbral

=== Saros 138 ===
This eclipse is a part of Saros series 138, repeating every 18 years, 11 days, and containing 82 events. The series started with a penumbral lunar eclipse on October 15, 1521. It contains partial eclipses from June 24, 1918 through August 28, 2026; total eclipses from September 7, 2044 through June 8, 2495; and a second set of partial eclipses from June 19, 2513 through August 13, 2603. The series ends at member 82 as a penumbral eclipse on March 30, 2982.

The longest duration of totality will be produced by member 48 at 105 minutes, 24 seconds on March 24, 2369. All eclipses in this series occur at the Moon's ascending node of orbit.

Greatest	First			
The greatest eclipse of the series will occur on 2369 Mar 24, lasting 105 minutes, 24 seconds.	Penumbral	Partial	Total	Central
The greatest eclipse of the series will occur on 2369 Mar 24, lasting 105 minutes, 24 seconds.	1521 Oct 15	1918 Jun 24	2044 Sep 07	2116 Oct 21
The greatest eclipse of the series will occur on 2369 Mar 24, lasting 105 minutes, 24 seconds.	Last			
The greatest eclipse of the series will occur on 2369 Mar 24, lasting 105 minutes, 24 seconds.	Central	Total	Partial	Penumbral
The greatest eclipse of the series will occur on 2369 Mar 24, lasting 105 minutes, 24 seconds.	2441 May 06	2495 Jun 08	2603 Aug 13	2982 Mar 30

Eclipses are tabulated in three columns; every third eclipse in the same column is one exeligmos apart, so they all cast shadows over approximately the same parts of the Earth.

Series members 17–38 occur between 1801 and 2200:
17	18	19
1810 Apr 19	1828 Apr 29	1846 May 11
20	21	22
1864 May 21	1882 Jun 01	1900 Jun 13
23	24	25
1918 Jun 24	1936 Jul 04	1954 Jul 16
26	27	28
1972 Jul 26	1990 Aug 06	2008 Aug 16
29	30	31
2026 Aug 28	2044 Sep 07	2062 Sep 18
32	33	34
2080 Sep 29	2098 Oct 10	2116 Oct 21
35	36	37
2134 Nov 02	2152 Nov 12	2170 Nov 23
38
2188 Dec 04

=== Tritos series ===
This eclipse is a part of a tritos cycle, repeating at alternating nodes every 135 synodic months (≈ 3986.63 days, or 11 years minus 1 month). Their appearance and longitude are irregular due to a lack of synchronization with the anomalistic month (period of perigee), but groupings of 3 tritos cycles (≈ 33 years minus 3 months) come close (≈ 434.044 anomalistic months), so eclipses are similar in these groupings.

Series members between 1801 and 2200
1801 Mar 30 (Saros 119)	1812 Feb 27 (Saros 120)	1823 Jan 26 (Saros 121)	1833 Dec 26 (Saros 122)	1844 Nov 24 (Saros 123)
1855 Oct 25 (Saros 124)	1866 Sep 24 (Saros 125)	1877 Aug 23 (Saros 126)	1888 Jul 23 (Saros 127)	1899 Jun 23 (Saros 128)
1910 May 24 (Saros 129)	1921 Apr 22 (Saros 130)	1932 Mar 22 (Saros 131)	1943 Feb 20 (Saros 132)	1954 Jan 19 (Saros 133)
1964 Dec 19 (Saros 134)	1975 Nov 18 (Saros 135)	1986 Oct 17 (Saros 136)	1997 Sep 16 (Saros 137)	2008 Aug 16 (Saros 138)
2019 Jul 16 (Saros 139)	2030 Jun 15 (Saros 140)	2041 May 16 (Saros 141)	2052 Apr 14 (Saros 142)	2063 Mar 14 (Saros 143)
2074 Feb 11 (Saros 144)	2085 Jan 10 (Saros 145)	2095 Dec 11 (Saros 146)	2106 Nov 11 (Saros 147)	2117 Oct 10 (Saros 148)
2128 Sep 09 (Saros 149)	2139 Aug 10 (Saros 150)	2150 Jul 09 (Saros 151)	2161 Jun 08 (Saros 152)	2172 May 08 (Saros 153)
	2194 Mar 07 (Saros 155)			

=== Inex series ===
This eclipse is a part of the long period inex cycle, repeating at alternating nodes, every 358 synodic months (≈ 10,571.95 days, or 29 years minus 20 days). Their appearance and longitude are irregular due to a lack of synchronization with the anomalistic month (period of perigee). However, groupings of 3 inex cycles (≈ 87 years minus 2 months) comes close (≈ 1,151.02 anomalistic months), so eclipses are similar in these groupings.

Series members between 1801 and 2200
1806 Jan 05 (Saros 131)	1834 Dec 16 (Saros 132)	1863 Nov 25 (Saros 133)
1892 Nov 04 (Saros 134)	1921 Oct 16 (Saros 135)	1950 Sep 26 (Saros 136)
1979 Sep 06 (Saros 137)	2008 Aug 16 (Saros 138)	2037 Jul 27 (Saros 139)
2066 Jul 07 (Saros 140)	2095 Jun 17 (Saros 141)	2124 May 28 (Saros 142)
2153 May 08 (Saros 143)	2182 Apr 18 (Saros 144)	

=== Half-Saros cycle ===
A lunar eclipse will be preceded and followed by solar eclipses by 9 years and 5.5 days (a half saros). This lunar eclipse is related to two total solar eclipses of Solar Saros 145.

August 11, 1999	August 21, 2017

== See also ==
- List of lunar eclipses and List of 21st-century lunar eclipses
- Solar eclipse of August 1, 2008
- File:2008-08-16 Lunar Eclipse Sketch.gif Chart
