= February 2008 lunar eclipse =

Total lunar eclipse of 20 February 2008

- Total eclipse
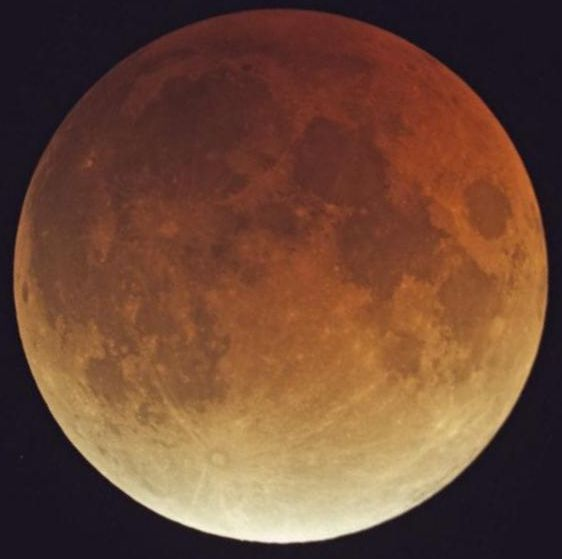
- Telescopic view, from North Billerica, Massachusetts at 3:25 UT, near greatest eclipse.
- Date: February 21, 2008
- Gamma: −0.3992
- Magnitude: 1.1081
- Saros cycle: 133 (26 of 71)
- Totality: 49 minutes, 46 seconds
- Partiality: 205 minutes, 28 seconds
- Penumbral: 339 minutes, 3 seconds
Contacts (UTC)
- P1: 00:36:34
- U1: 01:43:17
- U2: 03:01:09
- Greatest: 03:26:03
- U3: 03:50:55
- U4: 05:08:45
- P4: 06:15:37

A total lunar eclipse occurred at the Moon’s descending node of orbit on Thursday, February 21, 2008, with an umbral magnitude of 1.1081. A lunar eclipse occurs when the Moon moves into the Earth's shadow, causing the Moon to be darkened. A total lunar eclipse occurs when the Moon's near side entirely passes into the Earth's umbral shadow. Unlike a solar eclipse, which can only be viewed from a relatively small area of the world, a lunar eclipse may be viewed from anywhere on the night side of Earth. A total lunar eclipse can last up to nearly two hours, while a total solar eclipse lasts only a few minutes at any given place, because the Moon's shadow is smaller. The Moon's apparent diameter was near the average diameter because it occurred 7.2 days after perigee (on February 13, 2008, at 20:00 UTC) and 6.8 days before apogee (on February 27, 2008, at 20:30 UTC).

This eclipse fell on the Lantern Festival, the first since March 4, 2007 local time in Asia.

== Visibility ==
The eclipse was completely visible over North and South America, west Africa, and western Europe, seen rising over much of the Pacific Ocean and setting over much of Africa, eastern Europe, and west, central, and south Asia.

The bright star Regulus of Leo and the planet Saturn were prominent very near the Moon during the total eclipse portion. Shortly before the eclipse began, Regulus was occulted by the Moon in parts of the far Southern Atlantic Ocean and Antarctica.

Hourly motion shown right to left	The Moon's hourly motion across the Earth's shadow in the constellation of Leo.
Visibility map

== Timing ==
The Moon entered the penumbral shadow at 0:36 UTC, and the umbral shadow at 1:43. Totality lasted for 50 minutes, between 3:01 and 3:51. The Moon left the umbra shadow at 5:09 and left the penumbra shadow at 6:16.

Total Lunar Eclipse
Event		North and South America						Europe and Africa		
Event		Evening of February 20th						Morning of February 21st		
Event		AKST (-9_{h})	PST (-8_{h})	MST (-7_{h})	CST (-6_{h})	EST (-5_{h})	AST (-4_{h})	GMT (0_{h})	CET (+1_{h})	EET (+2_{h})
P1	Penumbral began	Under Horizon	Under Horizon	Under Horizon	18:36	19:36	20:36	0:36	1:36	2:36
U1	Partial began	Under Horizon	Under Horizon	18:43	19:43	20:43	21:43	1:43	2:43	3:43
U2	Total began	Under Horizon	19:01	20:01	21:01	22:01	23:01	3:01	4:01	5:01
	Mid-eclipse	18:26	19:26	20:26	21:26	22:26	23:26	3:26	4:26	5:26
U3	Total ended	18:51	19:51	20:51	21:51	22:51	23:51	3:51	4:51	Set
U4	Partial ended	20:09	21:09	22:09	23:09	0:09	1:09	5:09	Set	Set

== Images ==
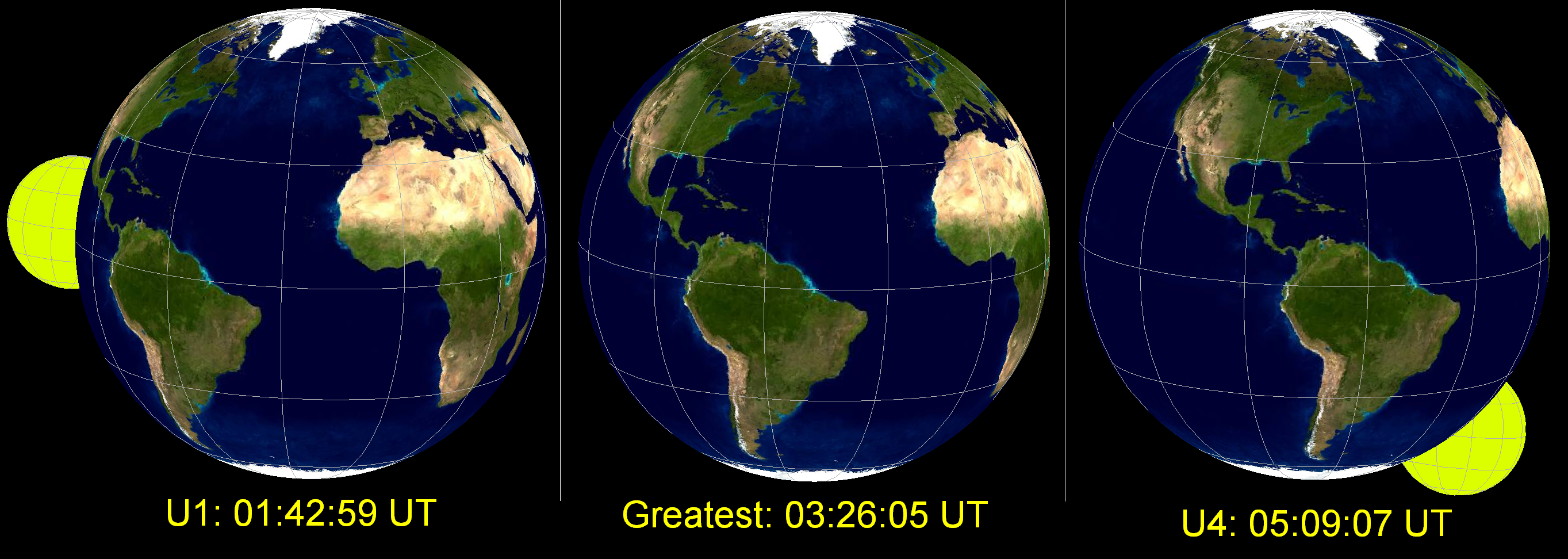
These simulated views of the Earth from the center of the Moon during the lunar eclipse show where the eclipse is visible on Earth.

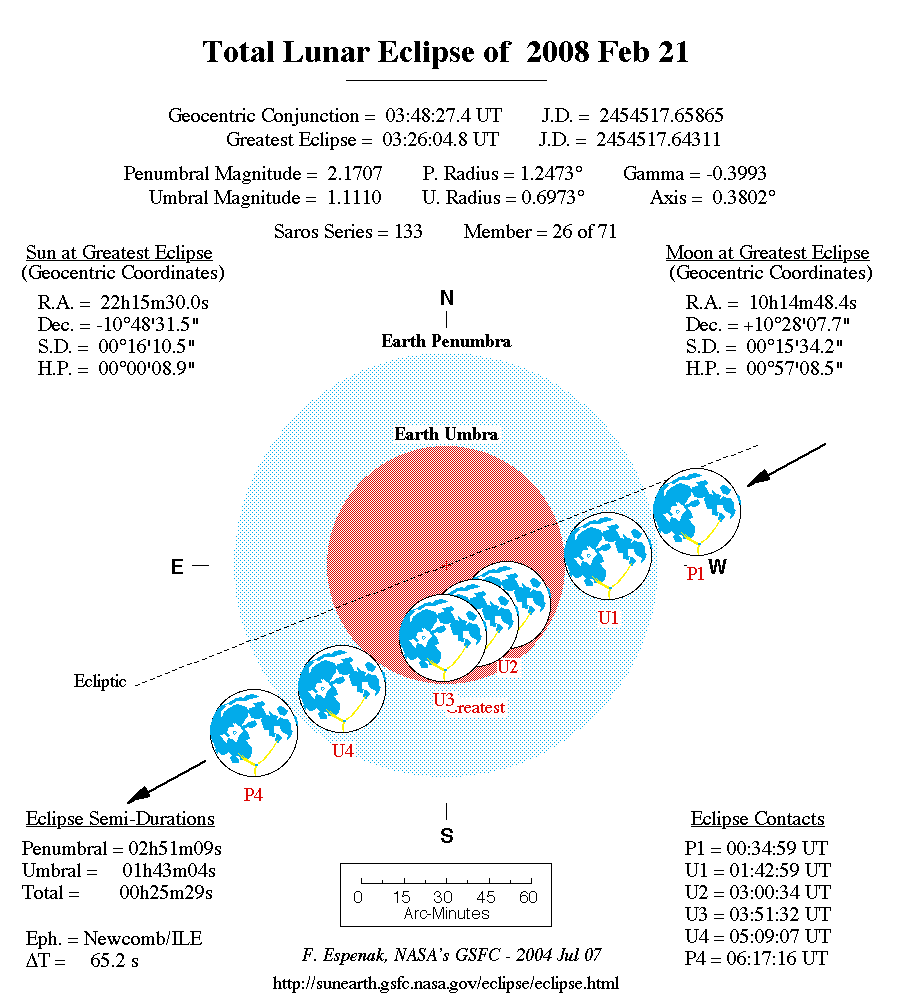
NASA chart of the eclipse

== Gallery ==
=== Composites ===
Eclipse observed from Sandim, Portugal. 41°02′22″N 8°30′50″W.	Eclipse observed from Regina, Saskatchewan. Each image is roughly taken 5 minutes apart.
Images taken in 3-5 minute Intervals - from Bradley, Illinois.	Eclipse observed from Halton Hills, Ontario. From 01:47 to 03:15 UTC, each image is roughly taken 5min apart.
Eclipse observed from Winnipeg, Manitoba
Lunar eclipse observed from Burlington, Ontario
Observed from Baltimore, Maryland, from 2:30 to 3:01 UTC. Lunar north is near left.

=== North America ===
==== Canada ====
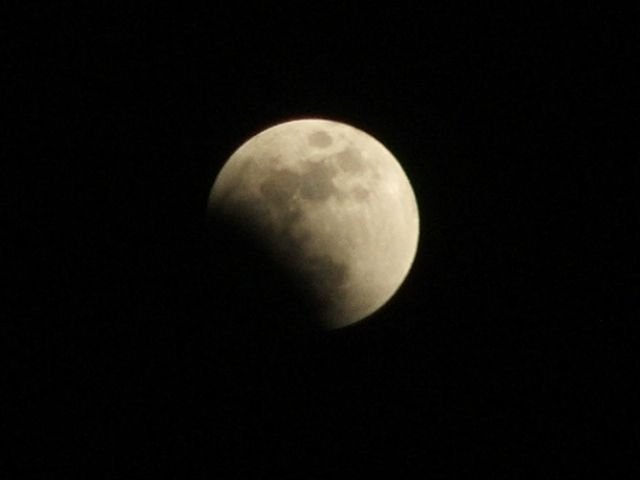
Eclipse Observed from Burlington, Ontario, at 2:00 UTC.

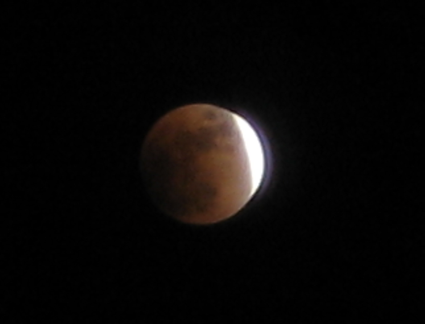
Eclipse observed from Victoria, British Columbia, at 2:49 UTC. Lunar north is near top-left.

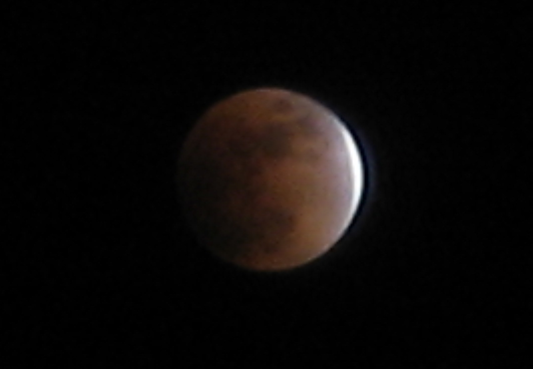
Eclipse observed from Victoria, British Columbia at 2:56 UTC, just prior to total. Lunar north is near top-left.

Eclipse observed from Salmon Arm, Canada at 3:11 UTC. Lunar north is near top-left.

Eclipse observed from Burlington, Ontario at 4:05 UTC.

==== USA (west) ====
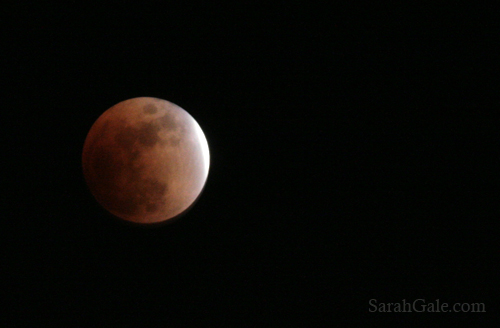
Eclipse observed from Salem, Oregon. Lunar north is near top-left.

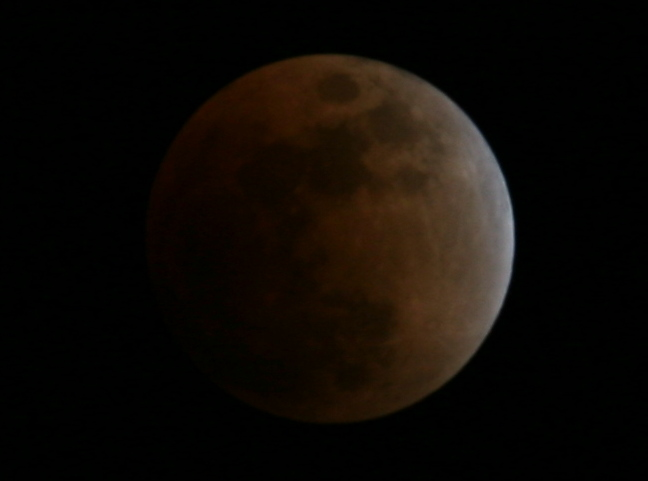
Observed from Urbana, Illinois, at 3:06 UTC. Lunar north is near top-left.

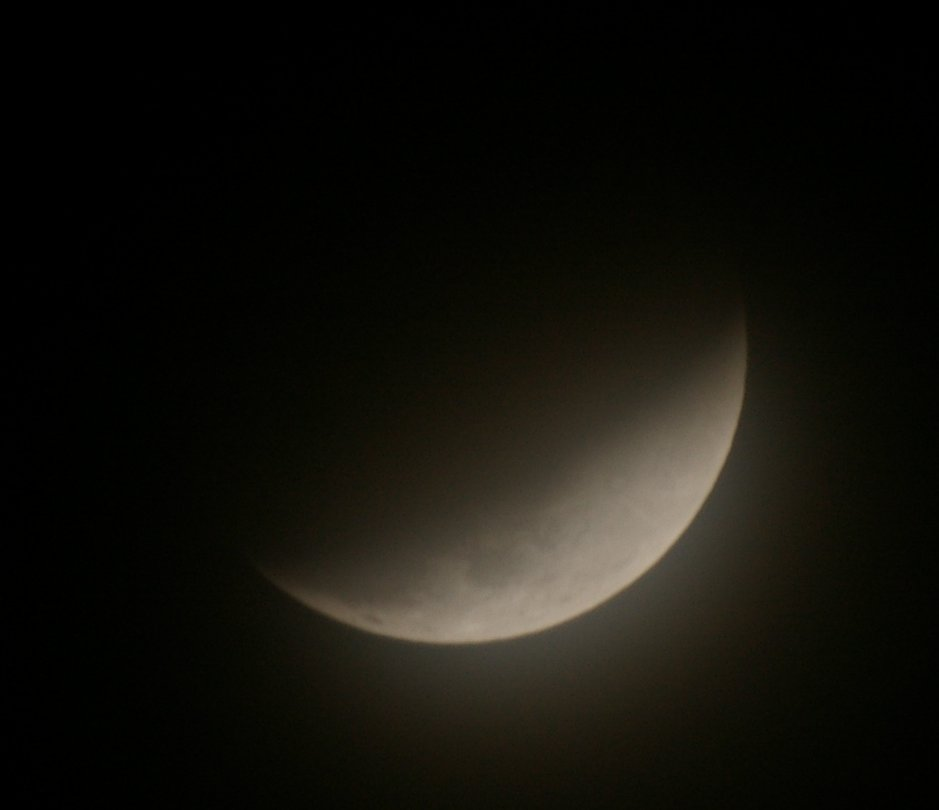
Observed from Boulder, Colorado, at 4:17 UTC. Lunar north is near top-left. Mare Humorum appears at bottom, Tycho's rays at bottom right.

==== USA (east) ====
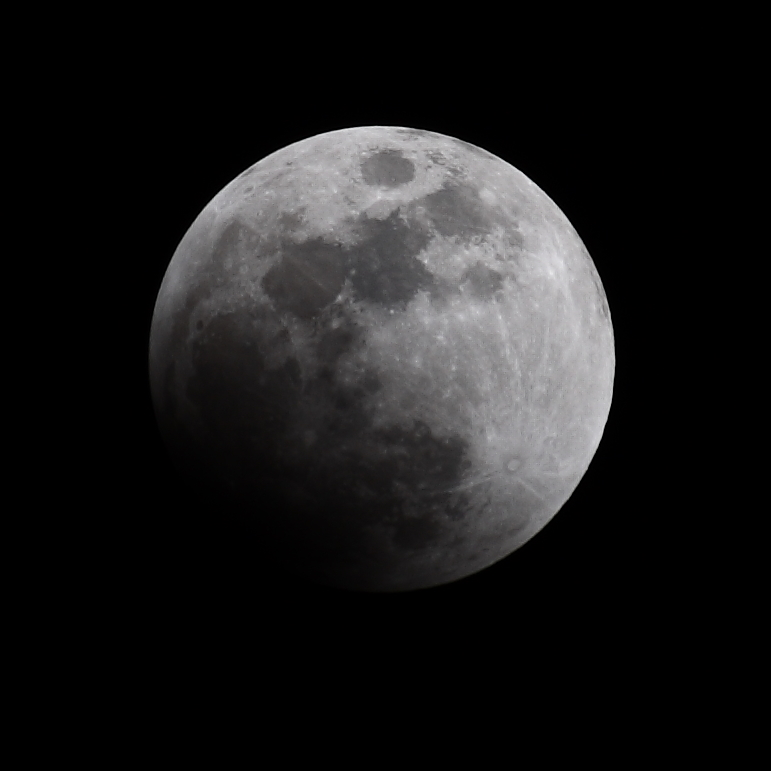
Moon observed from West Hartford, Connecticut, at 1:42 UTC. Lunar north is left.

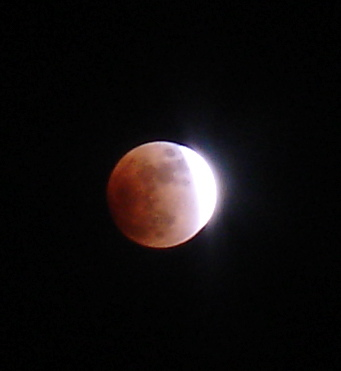
Eclipse observed from Philadelphia, Pennsylvania, at 2:49 UTC.

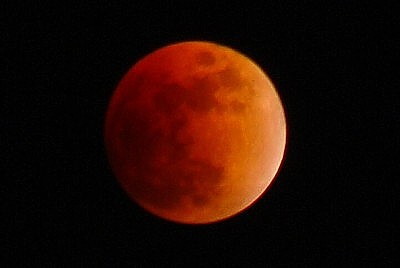
Eclipse observed from Millersville, Pennsylvania, at 3:15 UTC. Lunar north is near left.

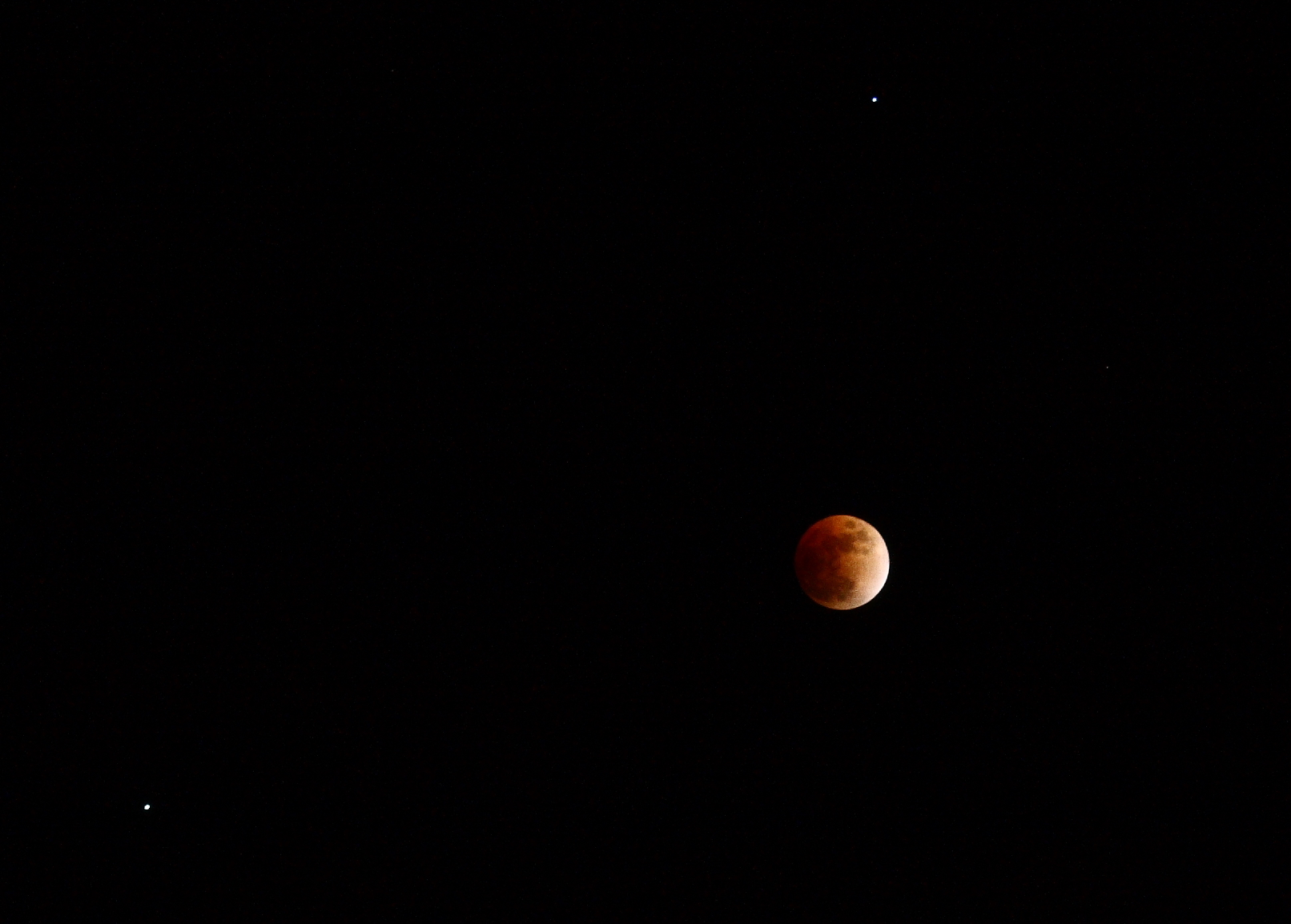
Eclipse observed from West Hartford, Connecticut, at 3:17 UTC. Lunar north is near top-left.

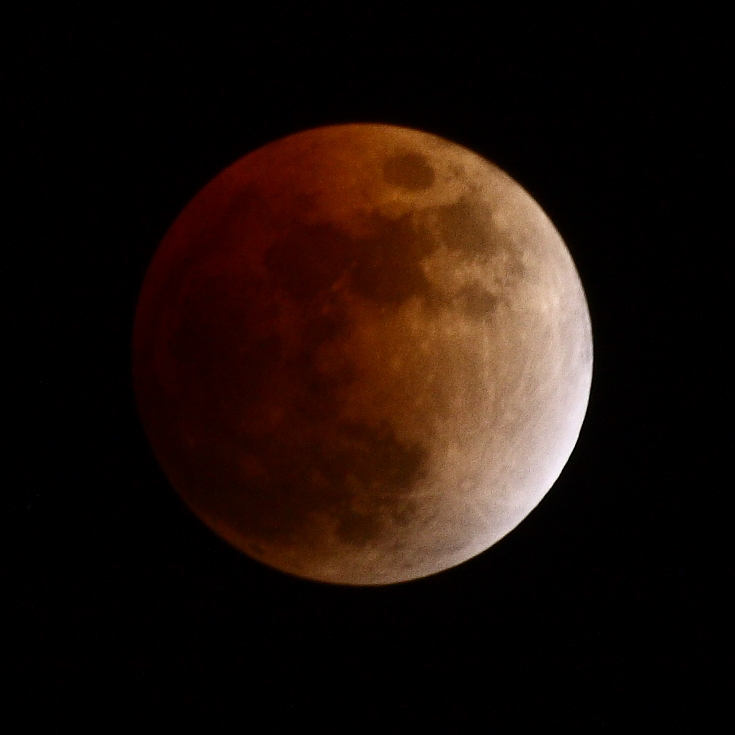
Eclipse observed from West Hartford, Connecticut, at 3:18 UTC. Lunar north is near top-left.

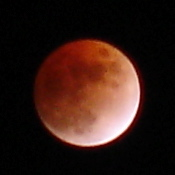
Eclipse observed from Philadelphia, Pennsylvania at 3:36 UTC. Lunar north is top-left.

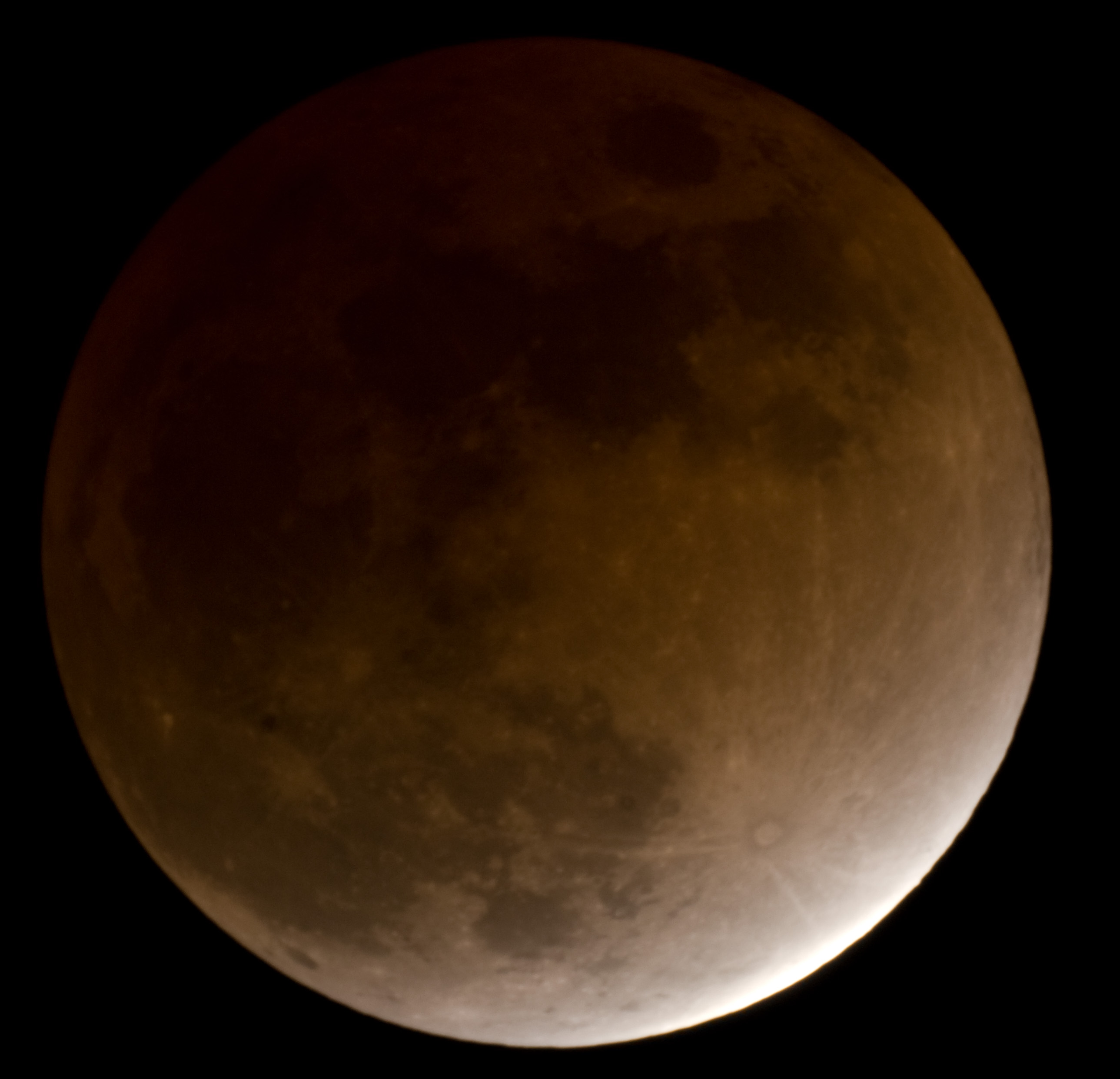
Eclipse observed from Wellesley, Massachusetts, at 3:52 UTC

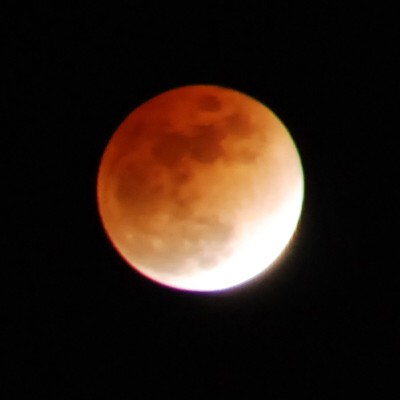
Eclipse observed from Fredericksburg, Virginia, at 3:57 UTC.

=== South America ===
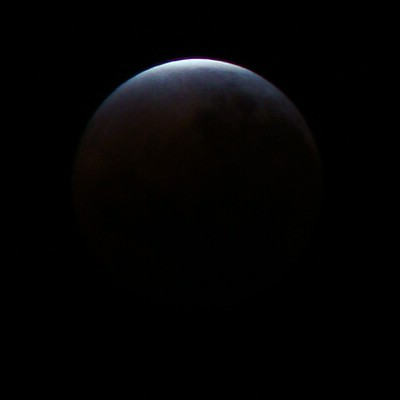
Eclipse observed from São Joaquim, Brazil at 3:52 UTC.

Evolution of the eclipse towards totality, observed from Mar del Plata, Argentina.

=== Europe and Africa ===
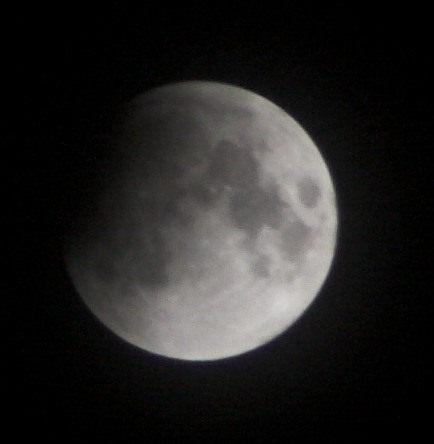
Eclipse observed from Rostock, Germany, at 1:50 UTC. Lunar north is near top.

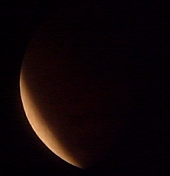
Eclipse observed from Sasolburg, South Africa - around 2:55 UTC. Lunar north is right.

Eclipse observed from Prague, Czech Republic at 3:41 UTC

== Eclipse details ==
Shown below is a table displaying details about this particular lunar eclipse. It describes various parameters pertaining to this eclipse.

February 21, 2008 Lunar Eclipse Parameters
Parameter	Value
Penumbral Magnitude	2.14698
Umbral Magnitude	1.10809
Gamma	-0.39923
Sun Right Ascension	22h15m30.0s
Sun Declination	-10°48'31.3"
Sun Semi-Diameter	16'10.5"
Sun Equatorial Horizontal Parallax	08.9"
Moon Right Ascension	10h14m48.5s
Moon Declination	+10°28'07.6"
Moon Semi-Diameter	15'34.2"
Moon Equatorial Horizontal Parallax	0°57'08.5"
ΔT	65.5 s

== Eclipse season ==
This eclipse is part of an eclipse season, a period, roughly every six months, when eclipses occur. Only two (or occasionally three) eclipse seasons occur each year, and each season lasts about 35 days and repeats just short of six months (173 days) later; thus two full eclipse seasons always occur each year. Either two or three eclipses happen each eclipse season. In the sequence below, each eclipse is separated by a fortnight.

Eclipse season of February 2008
February 7 Ascending node (new moon)	February 21 Descending node (full moon)
Annular solar eclipse Solar Saros 121	Total lunar eclipse Lunar Saros 133

== Related eclipses ==
=== Eclipses in 2008 ===
- An annular solar eclipse on February 7.
- A total lunar eclipse on February 21.
- A total solar eclipse on August 1.
- A partial lunar eclipse on August 16.

=== Metonic ===
- Preceded by: Lunar eclipse of May 4, 2004
- Followed by: Lunar eclipse of December 10, 2011

=== Tzolkinex ===
- Preceded by: Lunar eclipse of January 9, 2001
- Followed by: Lunar eclipse of April 4, 2015

=== Half-Saros ===
- Preceded by: Solar eclipse of February 16, 1999
- Followed by: Solar eclipse of February 26, 2017

=== Tritos ===
- Preceded by: Lunar eclipse of March 24, 1997
- Followed by: Lunar eclipse of January 21, 2019

=== Lunar Saros 133 ===
- Preceded by: Lunar eclipse of February 9, 1990
- Followed by: Lunar eclipse of March 3, 2026

=== Inex ===
- Preceded by: Lunar eclipse of March 13, 1979
- Followed by: Lunar eclipse of January 31, 2037

=== Triad ===
- Preceded by: Lunar eclipse of April 22, 1921
- Followed by: Lunar eclipse of December 21, 2094

=== Lunar eclipses of 2006–2009 ===
This eclipse is a member of a semester series. An eclipse in a semester series of lunar eclipses repeats approximately every 177 days and 4 hours (a semester) at alternating nodes of the Moon's orbit.

The lunar eclipses on July 7, 2009 (penumbral) and December 31, 2009 (partial) occur in the next lunar year eclipse set.

Lunar eclipse series sets from 2006 to 2009
Descending node				Ascending node			
Saros	Date Viewing	Type Chart	Gamma	Saros	Date Viewing	Type Chart	Gamma
113	2006 Mar 14	Penumbral	1.0211	118	2006 Sep 7	Partial	−0.9262
123	2007 Mar 03	Total	0.3175	128	2007 Aug 28	Total	−0.2146
133	2008 Feb 21	Total	−0.3992	138	2008 Aug 16	Partial	0.5646
143	2009 Feb 09	Penumbral	−1.0640	148	2009 Aug 06	Penumbral	1.3572

=== Metonic series ===
The Metonic cycle repeats nearly exactly every 19 years and represents a Saros cycle plus one lunar year. Because it occurs on the same calendar date, the Earth's shadow will in nearly the same location relative to the background stars.

Metonic lunar eclipse sets 1951–2027
Descending node			Ascending node		
Saros	Date	Type	Saros	Date	Type
103	1951 Feb 21.88	Penumbral	108	1951 Aug 17.13	Penumbral
113	1970 Feb 21.35	Partial	118	1970 Aug 17.14	Partial
123	1989 Feb 20.64	Total	128	1989 Aug 17.13	Total
133	2008 Feb 21.14	Total	138	2008 Aug 16.88	Partial
143	2027 Feb 20.96	Penumbral	148	2027 Aug 17.30	Penumbral

=== Saros 133 ===
This eclipse is a part of Saros series 133, repeating every 18 years, 11 days, and containing 71 events. The series started with a penumbral lunar eclipse on May 13, 1557. It contains partial eclipses from August 7, 1683 through December 17, 1899; total eclipses from December 28, 1917 through August 3, 2278; and a second set of partial eclipses from August 14, 2296 through March 11, 2639. The series ends at member 71 as a penumbral eclipse on June 29, 2819.

The longest duration of totality will be produced by member 35 at 101 minutes, 41 seconds on May 30, 2170. All eclipses in this series occur at the Moon’s descending node of orbit.

Greatest	First			
The greatest eclipse of the series will occur on 2170 May 30, lasting 101 minutes, 41 seconds.	Penumbral	Partial	Total	Central
The greatest eclipse of the series will occur on 2170 May 30, lasting 101 minutes, 41 seconds.	1557 May 13	1683 Aug 07	1917 Dec 28	2098 Apr 15
The greatest eclipse of the series will occur on 2170 May 30, lasting 101 minutes, 41 seconds.	Last			
The greatest eclipse of the series will occur on 2170 May 30, lasting 101 minutes, 41 seconds.	Central	Total	Partial	Penumbral
The greatest eclipse of the series will occur on 2170 May 30, lasting 101 minutes, 41 seconds.	2224 Jul 01	2278 Aug 03	2639 Mar 11	2819 Jun 29

Eclipses are tabulated in three columns; every third eclipse in the same column is one exeligmos apart, so they all cast shadows over approximately the same parts of the Earth.

Series members 15–36 occur between 1801 and 2200:
15	16	17
1809 Oct 23	1827 Nov 03	1845 Nov 14
18	19	20
1863 Nov 25	1881 Dec 05	1899 Dec 17
21	22	23
1917 Dec 28	1936 Jan 08	1954 Jan 19
24	25	26
1972 Jan 30	1990 Feb 09	2008 Feb 21
27	28	29
2026 Mar 03	2044 Mar 13	2062 Mar 25
30	31	32
2080 Apr 04	2098 Apr 15	2116 Apr 27
33	34	35
2134 May 08	2152 May 18	2170 May 30
36
2188 Jun 09

=== Tritos series ===
This eclipse is a part of a tritos cycle, repeating at alternating nodes every 135 synodic months (≈ 3986.63 days, or 11 years minus 1 month). Their appearance and longitude are irregular due to a lack of synchronization with the anomalistic month (period of perigee), but groupings of 3 tritos cycles (≈ 33 years minus 3 months) come close (≈ 434.044 anomalistic months), so eclipses are similar in these groupings.

Series members between 1801 and 2200
1811 Sep 02 (Saros 115)	1822 Aug 03 (Saros 116)	1833 Jul 02 (Saros 117)	1844 May 31 (Saros 118)	1855 May 02 (Saros 119)
1866 Mar 31 (Saros 120)	1877 Feb 27 (Saros 121)	1888 Jan 28 (Saros 122)	1898 Dec 27 (Saros 123)	1909 Nov 27 (Saros 124)
1920 Oct 27 (Saros 125)	1931 Sep 26 (Saros 126)	1942 Aug 26 (Saros 127)	1953 Jul 26 (Saros 128)	1964 Jun 25 (Saros 129)
1975 May 25 (Saros 130)	1986 Apr 24 (Saros 131)	1997 Mar 24 (Saros 132)	2008 Feb 21 (Saros 133)	2019 Jan 21 (Saros 134)
2029 Dec 20 (Saros 135)	2040 Nov 18 (Saros 136)	2051 Oct 19 (Saros 137)	2062 Sep 18 (Saros 138)	2073 Aug 17 (Saros 139)
2084 Jul 17 (Saros 140)	2095 Jun 17 (Saros 141)	2106 May 17 (Saros 142)	2117 Apr 16 (Saros 143)	2128 Mar 16 (Saros 144)
2139 Feb 13 (Saros 145)	2150 Jan 13 (Saros 146)	2160 Dec 13 (Saros 147)	2171 Nov 12 (Saros 148)	2182 Oct 11 (Saros 149)
2193 Sep 11 (Saros 150)

=== Inex series ===
This eclipse is a part of the long period inex cycle, repeating at alternating nodes, every 358 synodic months (≈ 10,571.95 days, or 29 years minus 20 days). Their appearance and longitude are irregular due to a lack of synchronization with the anomalistic month (period of perigee). However, groupings of 3 inex cycles (≈ 87 years minus 2 months) comes close (≈ 1,151.02 anomalistic months), so eclipses are similar in these groupings.

Series members between 1801 and 2200
1805 Jul 11 (Saros 126)	1834 Jun 21 (Saros 127)	1863 Jun 01 (Saros 128)
1892 May 11 (Saros 129)	1921 Apr 22 (Saros 130)	1950 Apr 02 (Saros 131)
1979 Mar 13 (Saros 132)	2008 Feb 21 (Saros 133)	2037 Jan 31 (Saros 134)
2066 Jan 11 (Saros 135)	2094 Dec 21 (Saros 136)	2123 Dec 03 (Saros 137)
2152 Nov 12 (Saros 138)	2181 Oct 22 (Saros 139)	

=== Half-Saros cycle ===
A lunar eclipse will be preceded and followed by solar eclipses by 9 years and 5.5 days (a half saros). This lunar eclipse is related to two annular solar eclipses of Solar Saros 140.

February 16, 1999	February 26, 2017

== See also ==
- List of lunar eclipses in the 21st century
- Lists of lunar eclipses
- Solar eclipse
- File:2008-02-21 Lunar Eclipse Sketch.gif Chart
