= Kramarzówka =

- Village
- Location within Poland
- Coordinates: 49°51′N 22°30′E
- Country: Poland
- Voivodeship: Subcarpathian
- County: Jarosław
- Gmina: Pruchnik
- Population: 1,500

Kramarzówka [kramaˈʐufka] is a village in the administrative district of Gmina Pruchnik, within Jarosław County, Subcarpathian Voivodeship, in south-eastern Poland.
