= Solar eclipse of February 7, 2008 =

- Annular eclipse
- Partial from Christchurch, New Zealand

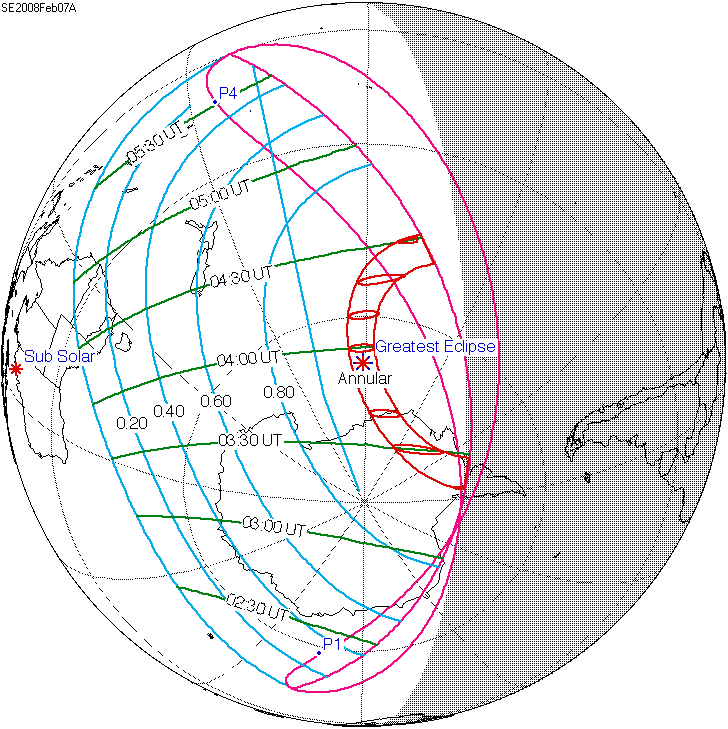
- Map
- Gamma: −0.957
- Magnitude: 0.965

Maximum eclipse
- Duration: 132 s (2 min 12 s)
- Coordinates: 67.6°S 150.5°W
- Max. width of band: 444 km (276 mi)

Times (UTC)
- Greatest eclipse: 3:56:10

References
- Saros: 121 (60 of 71)
- Catalog # (SE5000): 9525

An annular solar eclipse occurred at the Moon's ascending node of orbit on Thursday, February 7, 2008, with a magnitude of 0.965. A solar eclipse occurs when the Moon passes between Earth and the Sun, thereby totally or partly obscuring the image of the Sun for a viewer on Earth. An annular solar eclipse occurs when the Moon's apparent diameter is smaller than the Sun's, blocking most of the Sun's light and causing the Sun to look like an annulus (ring). An annular eclipse appears as a partial eclipse over a region of the Earth thousands of kilometres wide. The Moon's apparent diameter was near the average diameter because it occurred 7 days after apogee (on January 31, 2008, at 4:25 UTC) and 6.9 days before perigee (on February 14, 2008, at 1:00 UTC).

The moon's apparent diameter was 1 arcminute, 17.8 arcseconds (77.8 arcseconds) smaller than the August 1, 2008 total solar eclipse.

== Visibility ==
Centrality was visible from parts of Antarctica. A significant partial eclipse was visible over New Zealand and a minor partial eclipse was seen from southeastern Australia and much of Oceania.

For most solar eclipses the path of centrality moves eastwards. In this case the path moved west round Antarctica and then north.

== Observations ==
The best land-based visibility outside of Antarctica was from New Zealand. Professional astronomer and eclipse-chaser Jay Pasachoff observed it from Nelson, New Zealand, 60% coverage, under perfect weather.

== Images ==
Animated path

== Eclipse timing ==
=== Places experiencing partial eclipse ===
Solar Eclipse of February 7, 2008 (Local Times)
Country or territory	City or place	Start of partial eclipse	Maximum eclipse	End of partial eclipse	Duration of eclipse (hr:min)	Maximum coverage
South Africa	Marion Island	05:28:16 (sunrise)	05:31:44	05:35:08	0:07	0.42%
Antarctica	Casey Station	10:02:18	11:03:36	12:05:53	2:04	31.30%
Antarctica	Belgrano II Base	00:11:03	01:07:28	02:04:10	1:53	83.44%
Antarctica	McMurdo Station	15:22:18	16:28:29	17:33:24	2:11	76.87%
Australia	Macquarie Island	13:54:30	15:05:30	16:12:07	2:18	49.60%
Australia	Hobart	14:18:47	15:19:18	16:15:53	1:57	18.53%
Australia	Adelaide	14:36:26	14:56:39	15:16:23	0:40	0.49%
Australia	Melbourne	14:38:34	15:28:13	16:14:54	1:36	8.91%
French Polynesia	Papeete (Note: The times listed for this location occur on February 6, 2008, local time.)	18:26:28	18:33:45	18:36:07 (sunset)	0:10	4.22%
Australia	Canberra	14:47:33	15:38:49	16:26:37	1:39	10.74%
New Zealand	Chatham Islands	17:17:58	18:24:41	19:25:56	2:08	66.35%
New Zealand	Wellington	16:35:33	17:42:49	18:44:18	2:09	53.07%
Australia	Sydney	14:52:30	15:44:08	16:32:07	1:40	11.55%
New Zealand	Auckland	16:46:42	17:51:51	18:51:14	2:05	47.00%
Australia	Lord Howe Island	14:59:09	15:55:28	16:47:12	1:48	18.71%
Australia	Brisbane	14:18:39	15:00:06	15:38:55	1:20	6.19%
Norfolk Island	Kingston	15:36:52	16:35:04	17:28:14	1:51	26.68%
Cook Islands	Rarotonga	18:23:26	19:15:46	19:21:41 (sunset)	0:58	43.61%
New Caledonia	Nouméa	15:29:03	16:17:26	17:02:08	1:33	14.57%
Tonga	Nuku'alofa	17:27:20	18:20:28	19:09:23	1:42	31.78%
Niue	Alofi	17:31:06	18:22:18	18:59:26 (sunset)	1:28	32.17%
Fiji	Suva	16:37:09	17:25:39	18:10:29	1:33	20.34%
Vanuatu	Port Vila	15:43:57	16:25:46	17:04:45	1:21	9.94%
Fiji	Nadi	16:38:31	17:26:12	18:10:19	1:32	18.81%
Fiji	Lautoka	16:39:05	17:26:30	18:10:22	1:31	18.50%
American Samoa	Pago Pago	17:43:04	18:28:48	18:56:40 (sunset)	1:14	22.05%
Samoa	Apia	17:44:43	18:29:42	19:00:24 (sunset)	1:16	20.44%
Wallis and Futuna	Mata Utu	16:48:28	17:31:35	18:11:51	1:23	16.22%
Tokelau	Fakaofo	17:56:39	18:34:45	18:52:54 (sunset)	0:56	12.37%
Tuvalu	Funafuti	17:07:52	17:38:36	18:07:48	1:00	5.23%

== Gallery ==
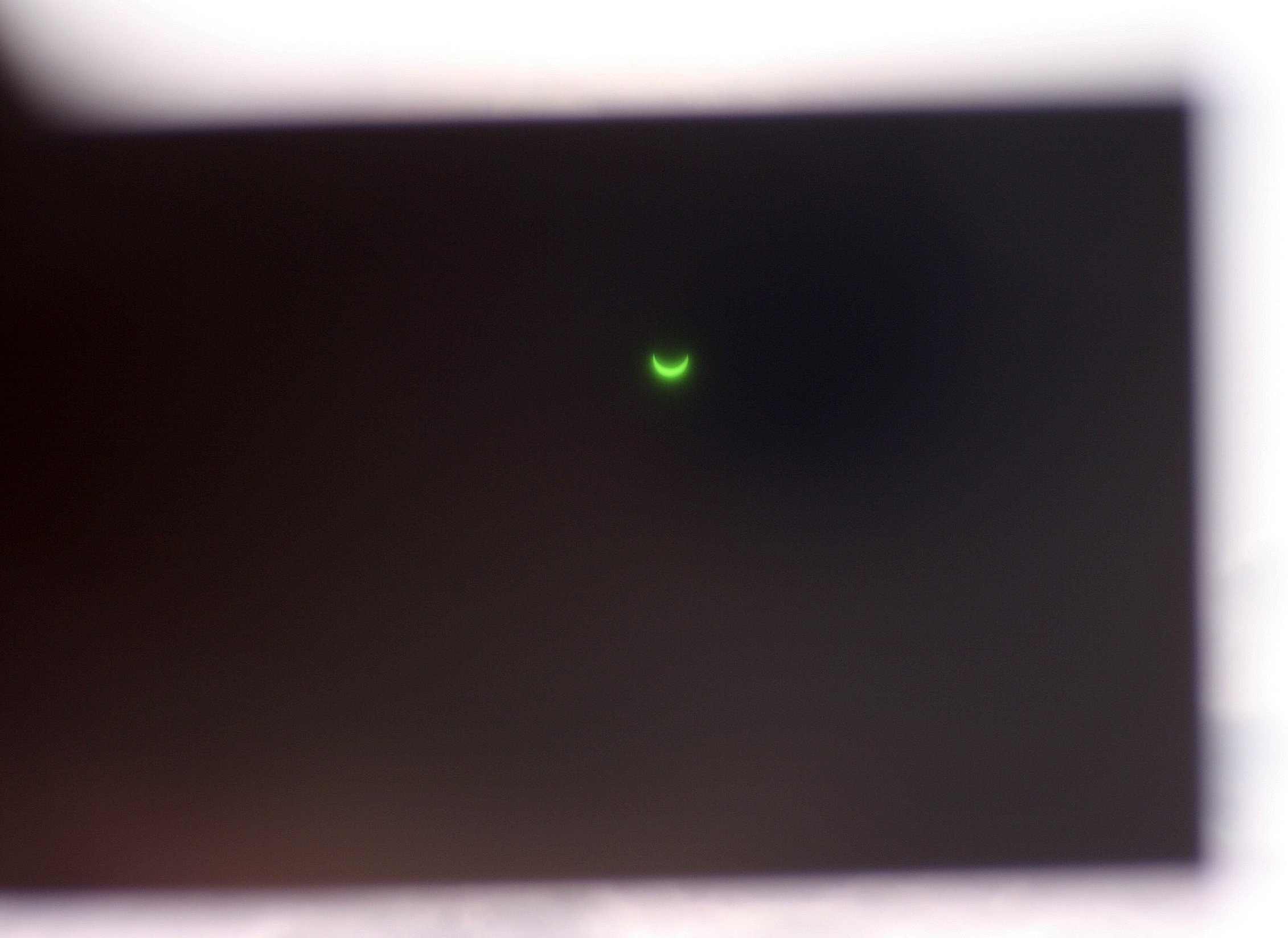
Partial from McMurdo, Antarctica, 3:23 UTC

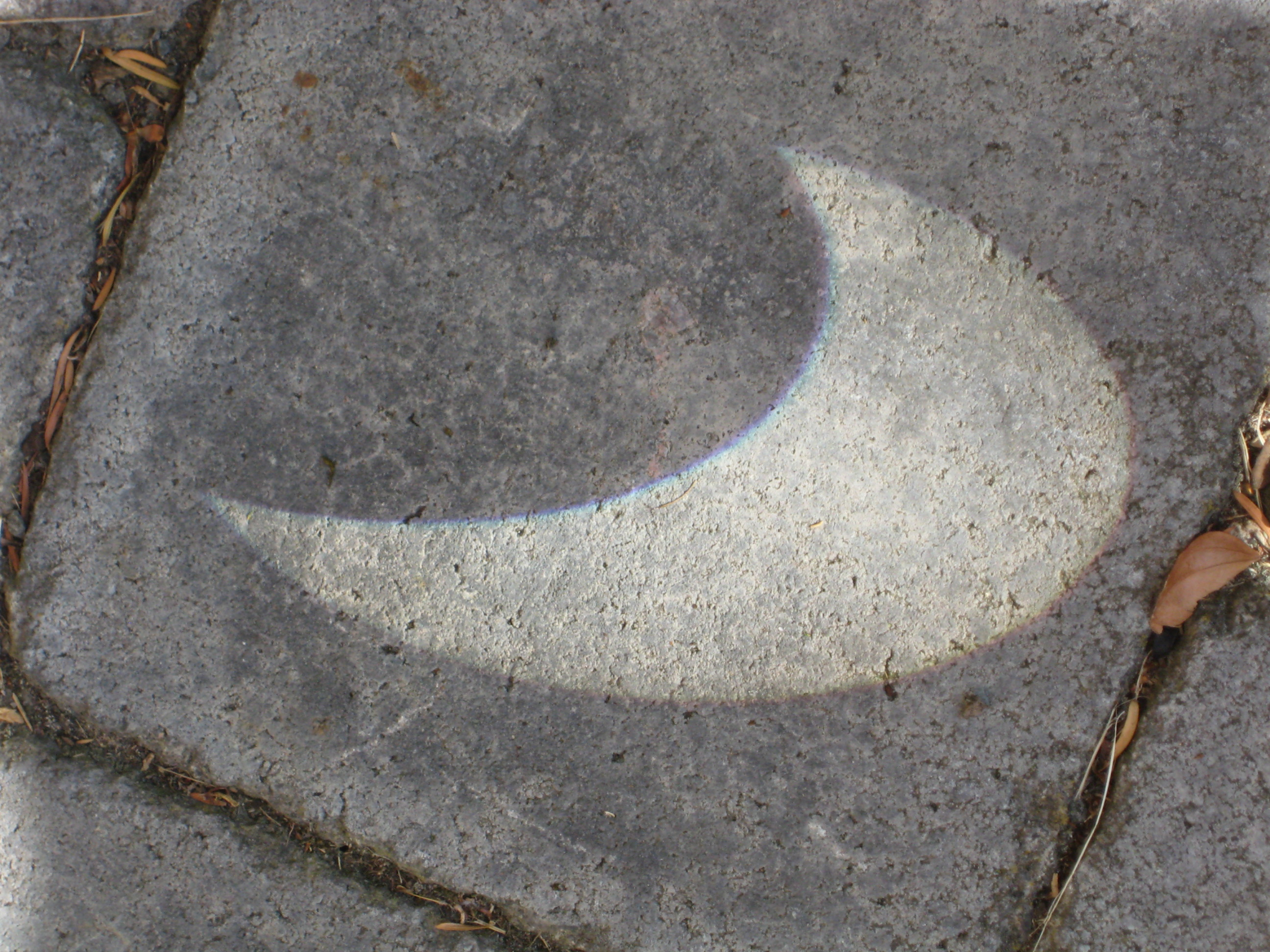
Eclipse projection in Christchurch, New Zealand

== Eclipse details ==
Shown below are two tables displaying details about this particular solar eclipse. The first table outlines times at which the Moon's penumbra or umbra attains the specific parameter, and the second table describes various other parameters pertaining to this eclipse.

February 7, 2008 Solar Eclipse Times
Event	Time (UTC)
First Penumbral External Contact	2008 February 07 at 01:39:34.7 UTC
Equatorial Conjunction	2008 February 07 at 03:09:56.4 UTC
First Umbral External Contact	2008 February 07 at 03:20:50.1 UTC
First Central Line	2008 February 07 at 03:25:03.4 UTC
Greatest Duration	2008 February 07 at 03:25:03.4 UTC
First Umbral Internal Contact	2008 February 07 at 03:29:52.5 UTC
Ecliptic Conjunction	2008 February 07 at 03:45:36.0 UTC
Greatest Eclipse	2008 February 07 at 03:56:10.5 UTC
Last Umbral Internal Contact	2008 February 07 at 04:23:01.0 UTC
Last Central Line	2008 February 07 at 04:27:46.7 UTC
Last Umbral External Contact	2008 February 07 at 04:31:56.6 UTC
Last Penumbral External Contact	2008 February 07 at 06:12:58.9 UTC

February 7, 2008 Solar Eclipse Parameters
Parameter	Value
Eclipse Magnitude	0.96499
Eclipse Obscuration	0.93120
Gamma	−0.95701
Sun Right Ascension	21h20m44.7s
Sun Declination	-15°30'56.2"
Sun Semi-Diameter	16'13.1"
Sun Equatorial Horizontal Parallax	08.9"
Moon Right Ascension	21h22m15.3s
Moon Declination	-16°21'00.5"
Moon Semi-Diameter	15'35.2"
Moon Equatorial Horizontal Parallax	0°57'12.3"
ΔT	65.4 s

== Eclipse season ==
This eclipse is part of an eclipse season, a period, roughly every six months, when eclipses occur. Only two (or occasionally three) eclipse seasons occur each year, and each season lasts about 35 days and repeats just short of six months (173 days) later; thus two full eclipse seasons always occur each year. Either two or three eclipses happen each eclipse season. In the sequence below, each eclipse is separated by a fortnight.

Eclipse season of February 2008
February 7 Ascending node (new moon)	February 21 Descending node (full moon)
Annular solar eclipse Solar Saros 121	Total lunar eclipse Lunar Saros 133

== Related eclipses ==
=== Eclipses in 2008 ===
- An annular solar eclipse on February 7.
- A total lunar eclipse on February 21.
- A total solar eclipse on August 1.
- A partial lunar eclipse on August 16.

=== Metonic ===
- Preceded by: Solar eclipse of April 19, 2004
- Followed by: Solar eclipse of November 25, 2011

=== Tzolkinex ===
- Preceded by: Solar eclipse of December 25, 2000
- Followed by: Solar eclipse of March 20, 2015

=== Half-Saros ===
- Preceded by: Lunar eclipse of January 31, 1999
- Followed by: Lunar eclipse of February 11, 2017

=== Tritos ===
- Preceded by: Solar eclipse of March 9, 1997
- Followed by: Solar eclipse of January 6, 2019

=== Solar Saros 121 ===
- Preceded by: Solar eclipse of January 26, 1990
- Followed by: Solar eclipse of February 17, 2026

=== Inex ===
- Preceded by: Solar eclipse of February 26, 1979
- Followed by: Solar eclipse of January 16, 2037

=== Triad ===
- Preceded by: Solar eclipse of April 8, 1921
- Followed by: Solar eclipse of December 7, 2094

=== Solar eclipses of 2008–2011 ===
This eclipse is a member of a semester series. An eclipse in a semester series of solar eclipses repeats approximately every 177 days and 4 hours (a semester) at alternating nodes of the Moon's orbit.

The partial solar eclipses on June 1, 2011 and November 25, 2011 occur in the next lunar year eclipse set.

Solar eclipse series sets from 2008 to 2011
Ascending node			Descending node		
Saros	Map	Gamma	Saros	Map	Gamma
121 Partial in Christchurch, New Zealand	February 7, 2008 Annular	−0.95701	126 Totality in Kumul, Xinjiang, China	August 1, 2008 Total	0.83070
131 Annularity in Palangka Raya, Indonesia	January 26, 2009 Annular	−0.28197	136 Totality in Kurigram District, Bangladesh	July 22, 2009 Total	0.06977
141 Annularity in Jinan, Shandong, China	January 15, 2010 Annular	0.40016	146 Totality in Hao, French Polynesia	July 11, 2010 Total	−0.67877
151 Partial in Poland	January 4, 2011 Partial	1.06265	156	July 1, 2011 Partial	−1.49171

=== Saros 121 ===
This eclipse is a part of Saros series 121, repeating every 18 years, 11 days, and containing 71 events. The series started with a partial solar eclipse on April 25, 944 AD. It contains total eclipses from July 10, 1070 through October 9, 1809; hybrid eclipses on October 20, 1827 and October 30, 1845; and annular eclipses from November 11, 1863 through February 28, 2044. The series ends at member 71 as a partial eclipse on June 7, 2206. Its eclipses are tabulated in three columns; every third eclipse in the same column is one exeligmos apart, so they all cast shadows over approximately the same parts of the Earth.

The longest duration of totality was produced by member 39 at 6 minutes, 20 seconds on June 21, 1629, and the longest duration of annularity will be produced by member 62 at 2 minutes, 27 seconds on February 28, 2044. All eclipses in this series occur at the Moon’s ascending node of orbit.

Series members 49–70 occur between 1801 and 2200:
49	50	51
October 9, 1809	October 20, 1827	October 30, 1845
52	53	54
November 11, 1863	November 21, 1881	December 3, 1899
55	56	57
December 14, 1917	December 25, 1935	January 5, 1954
58	59	60
January 16, 1972	January 26, 1990	February 7, 2008
61	62	63
February 17, 2026	February 28, 2044	March 11, 2062
64	65	66
March 21, 2080	April 1, 2098	April 13, 2116
67	68	69
April 24, 2134	May 4, 2152	May 16, 2170
70
May 26, 2188

=== Metonic series ===
The metonic series repeats eclipses every 19 years (6939.69 days), lasting about 5 cycles. Eclipses occur in nearly the same calendar date. In addition, the octon subseries repeats 1/5 of that or every 3.8 years (1387.94 days). All eclipses in this table occur at the Moon's ascending node.

21 eclipse events between July 1, 2000 and July 1, 2076
July 1–2	April 19–20	February 5–7	November 24–25	September 12–13
117	119	121	123	125
July 1, 2000	April 19, 2004	February 7, 2008	November 25, 2011	September 13, 2015
127	129	131	133	135
July 2, 2019	April 20, 2023	February 6, 2027	November 25, 2030	September 12, 2034
137	139	141	143	145
July 2, 2038	April 20, 2042	February 5, 2046	November 25, 2049	September 12, 2053
147	149	151	153	155
July 1, 2057	April 20, 2061	February 5, 2065	November 24, 2068	September 12, 2072
157
July 1, 2076

=== Tritos series ===
This eclipse is a part of a tritos cycle, repeating at alternating nodes every 135 synodic months (≈ 3986.63 days, or 11 years minus 1 month). Their appearance and longitude are irregular due to a lack of synchronization with the anomalistic month (period of perigee), but groupings of 3 tritos cycles (≈ 33 years minus 3 months) come close (≈ 434.044 anomalistic months), so eclipses are similar in these groupings.

Series members between 1866 and 2200
March 16, 1866 (Saros 108)			December 13, 1898 (Saros 111)	
	September 12, 1931 (Saros 114)	August 12, 1942 (Saros 115)	July 11, 1953 (Saros 116)	June 10, 1964 (Saros 117)
May 11, 1975 (Saros 118)	April 9, 1986 (Saros 119)	March 9, 1997 (Saros 120)	February 7, 2008 (Saros 121)	January 6, 2019 (Saros 122)
December 5, 2029 (Saros 123)	November 4, 2040 (Saros 124)	October 4, 2051 (Saros 125)	September 3, 2062 (Saros 126)	August 3, 2073 (Saros 127)
July 3, 2084 (Saros 128)	June 2, 2095 (Saros 129)	May 3, 2106 (Saros 130)	April 2, 2117 (Saros 131)	March 1, 2128 (Saros 132)
January 30, 2139 (Saros 133)	December 30, 2149 (Saros 134)	November 27, 2160 (Saros 135)	October 29, 2171 (Saros 136)	September 27, 2182 (Saros 137)
August 26, 2193 (Saros 138)

=== Inex series ===
This eclipse is a part of the long period inex cycle, repeating at alternating nodes, every 358 synodic months (≈ 10,571.95 days, or 29 years minus 20 days). Their appearance and longitude are irregular due to a lack of synchronization with the anomalistic month (period of perigee). However, groupings of 3 inex cycles (≈ 87 years minus 2 months) comes close (≈ 1,151.02 anomalistic months), so eclipses are similar in these groupings.

Series members between 1801 and 2200
June 26, 1805 (Saros 114)	June 7, 1834 (Saros 115)	May 17, 1863 (Saros 116)
April 26, 1892 (Saros 117)	April 8, 1921 (Saros 118)	March 18, 1950 (Saros 119)
February 26, 1979 (Saros 120)	February 7, 2008 (Saros 121)	January 16, 2037 (Saros 122)
December 27, 2065 (Saros 123)	December 7, 2094 (Saros 124)	November 18, 2123 (Saros 125)
October 28, 2152 (Saros 126)	October 8, 2181 (Saros 127)	
