= Gmina Pruchnik =

Gmina Pruchnik Pruchnik Commune
- Gmina
- Coat of arms
- Interactive map of Gmina Pruchnik
- Coordinates (Pruchnik): 49°55′N 22°31′E
- Country: Poland
- Voivodeship: Subcarpathian
- County: Jarosław
- Seat: Pruchnik

Area
  - Total: 78.26 km^{2} (30.22 sq mi)

Population (2013)
  - Total: 9,845
  - Density: 125.8/km^{2} (325.8/sq mi)
  - Urban: 3,751
  - Rural: 6,094

Gmina Pruchnik is an urban-rural gmina (administrative district) in Jarosław County, Subcarpathian Voivodeship, in south-eastern Poland. Its seat is the town of Pruchnik, which lies approximately 17 kilometres (11 mi) south-west of Jarosław and 39 km (24 mi) east of the regional capital Rzeszów.

The gmina covers an area of 78.26 square kilometres (30.2 sq mi), and as of 2006 its total population is 9,551 (9,845 in 2013). Formerly classified as a rural gmina, it become urban-rural when Pruchnik became a town on 1 January 2011.

== Villages ==
Apart from the town of Pruchnik, Gmina Pruchnik contains the villages and settlements of Hawłowice, Jodłówka, Kramarzówka, Rozbórz Długi, Rozbórz Okrągły, Rzeplin and Świebodna.

== Neighbouring gminas ==
Gmina Pruchnik is bordered by the gminas of Dubiecko, Kańczuga, Krzywcza, Roźwienica and Zarzecze.
