= Rozbórz Okrągły =

- Village
- Location within Poland
- Coordinates: 49°56′N 22°30′E
- Country: Poland
- Voivodeship: Subcarpathian
- County: Jarosław
- Gmina: Pruchnik

Rozbórz Okrągły [ˈrɔzbuʂ ɔˈkrɔŋɡwɨ] is a village in the administrative district of Gmina Pruchnik, within Jarosław County, Subcarpathian Voivodeship, in south-eastern Poland.
