= Jodłówka, Podkarpackie Voivodeship =

Jodłówka
- Village
- Location within Poland
- Coordinates: 49°56′N 22°25′E
- Country: Poland
- Voivodeship: Subcarpathian
- County: Jarosław
- Gmina: Pruchnik
- Elevation: 300 m (980 ft)
- Population: 1,822
- Website: http://www.jodlowka.prv.pl

Jodłówka [jɔdˈwufka] is a village in the administrative district of Gmina Pruchnik, within Jarosław County, Subcarpathian Voivodeship, in south-eastern Poland.
