= Pruchnik =

- Town
- Market Square with historic wooden architecture from the 18th century

- Flag Coat of arms

- Location within Poland
- Coordinates: 49°55′N 22°31′E
- Country: Poland
- Voivodeship: Subcarpathian
- County: Jarosław
- Gmina: Pruchnik
- Town rights: 1436

Population
  - Total: 3,519
- Vehicle registration: RJA
- Website: http://www.pruchnik.pl

Pruchnik ([ˈpruxɲik]) is a town in Jarosław County, Subcarpathian Voivodeship, in south-eastern Poland. It is the seat of the administrative district called Gmina Pruchnik. The town has a population of 3,519. It lies approximately 21 km (13 mi) southwest of Jarosław.

== History ==
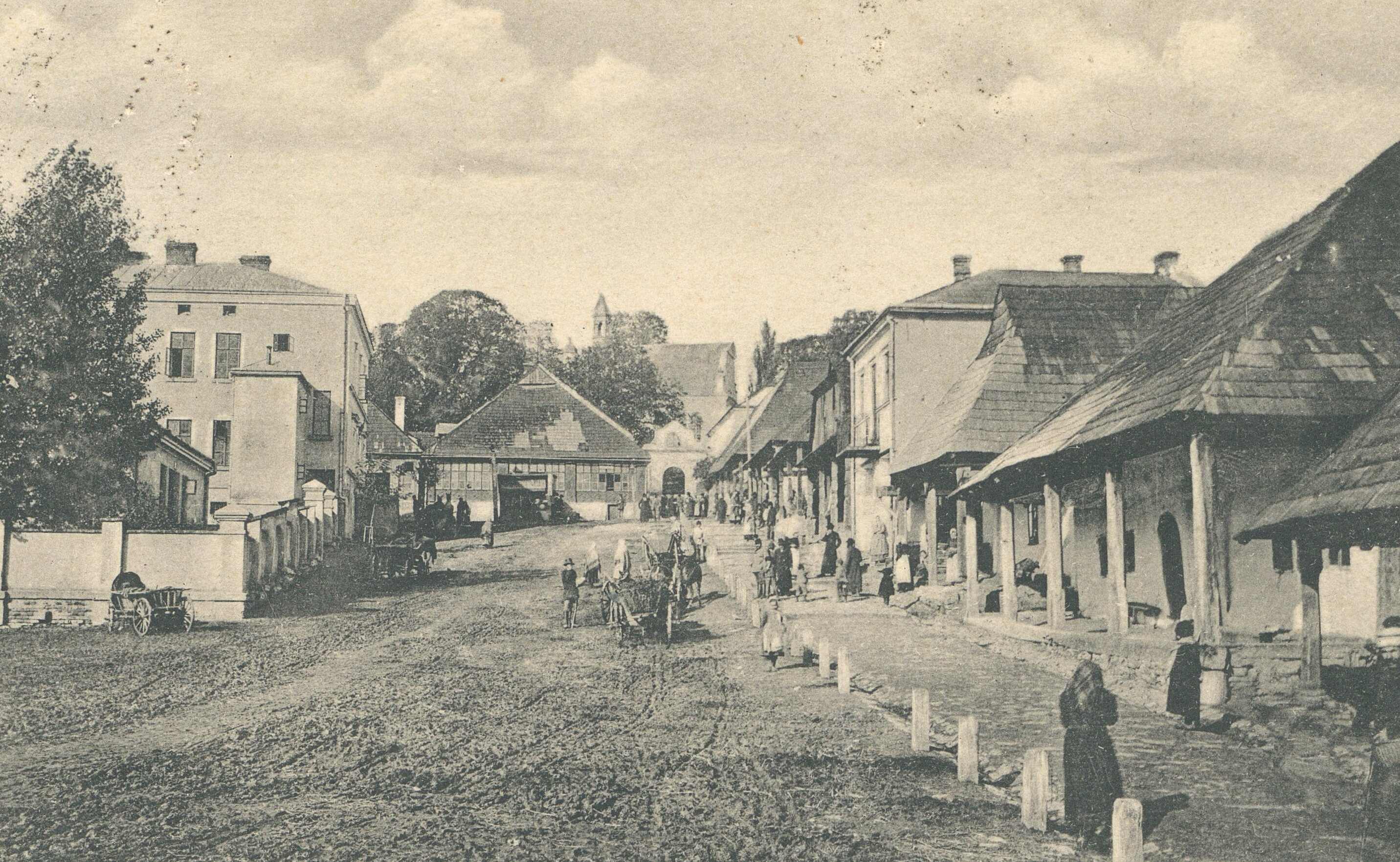
Market Square, before 1912

The history of Pruchnik dates back to the 14th century. Pruchnik was first mentioned in documents from 1397. The village, together with a nearby castle, belonged to the noble Pruchnicki family (Korczak coat of arms), after which the town is named. The Pruchnicki family founded a local Roman Catholic parish some time in the second half of the 14th century. Pruchnik was granted town rights in 1436. Administratively, it was located in the Ruthenian Voivodeship in the Lesser Poland Province of the Kingdom of Poland. In 1498, Pruchnik was burned in a Vallachian raid, and in 1524, a Crimean Tatar unit tried to capture the town, but was defeated in a skirmish. Pruchnik remained a small town, destroyed by fires (1635, 1720). Complete destruction took place in 1657, when Pruchnik was burned to the ground by Transylvanian army of George II Rakoczi (see Swedish invasion of Poland).

In the First Partition of Poland (1772), Pruchnik was annexed by the Habsburg Empire, and remained in Austrian Galicia until 1918. In 1888, its population consisted of 740 Roman Catholics, 188 Greek Catholics, and 188 Jews. The town remained a private property until 1929, when its last owner, Countess Klementyna Szembekowa died. In 1935, it lost its town charter, remaining a village until 2011.

Following the German-Soviet invasion of Poland, which started World War II in September 1939, Pruchnik was occupied by Germany until 1944.

In 2019, Pruchnik was condemned by the World Jewish Congress for doing the Burning of Judas.

== Sights ==
Due to its location, away from main roads and railway lines, Pruchnik is regarded as one of the most picturesque towns of former Galicia, with a number of unique wooden houses, most of which built in the second half of the 19th century. The town also has a medieval St. Nicolas church, which was remodelled in the late 17th century, and ruins of the castle, located some 4 kilometers away, along the road to Jarosław.

Examples of wooden houses of Pruchnik:

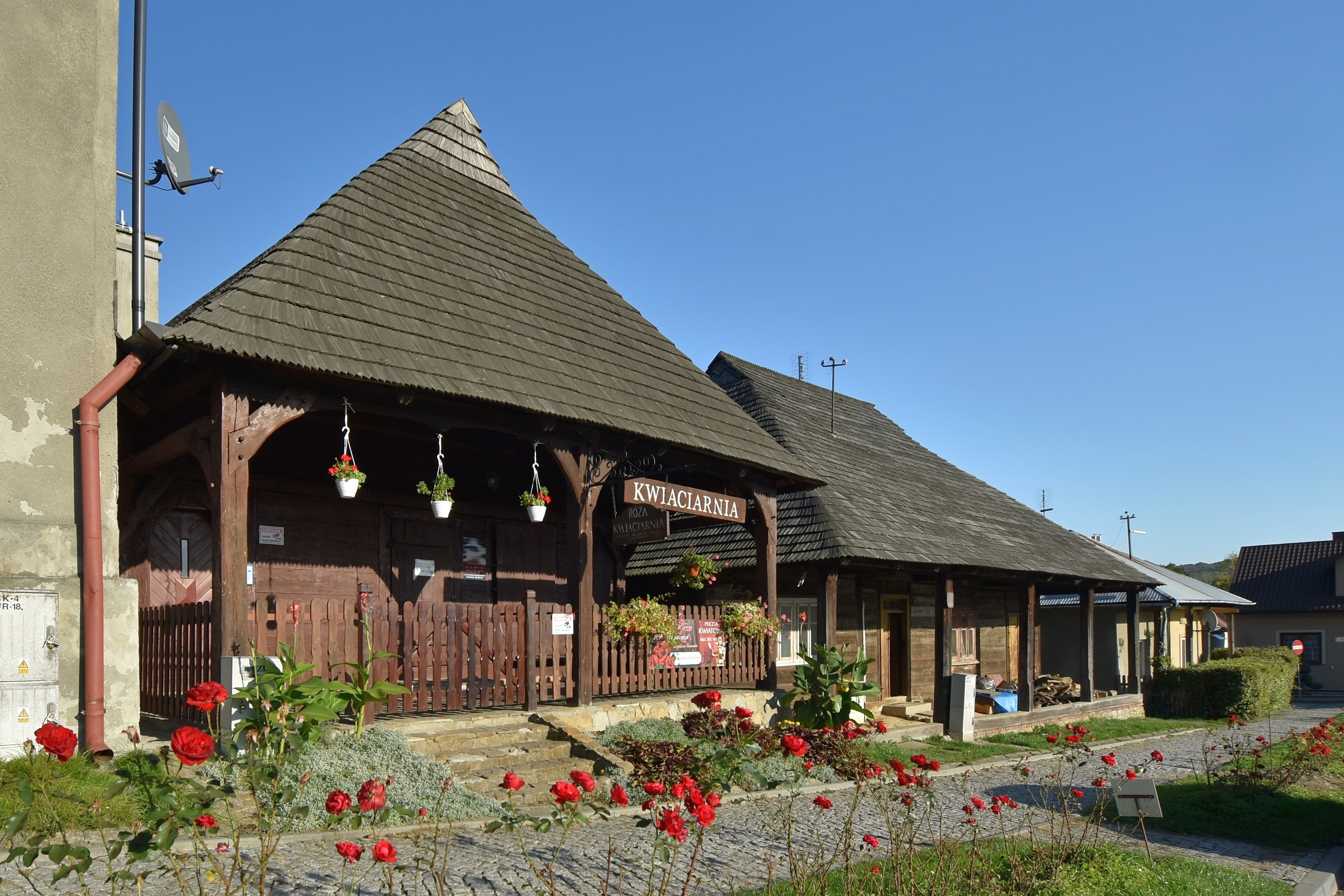

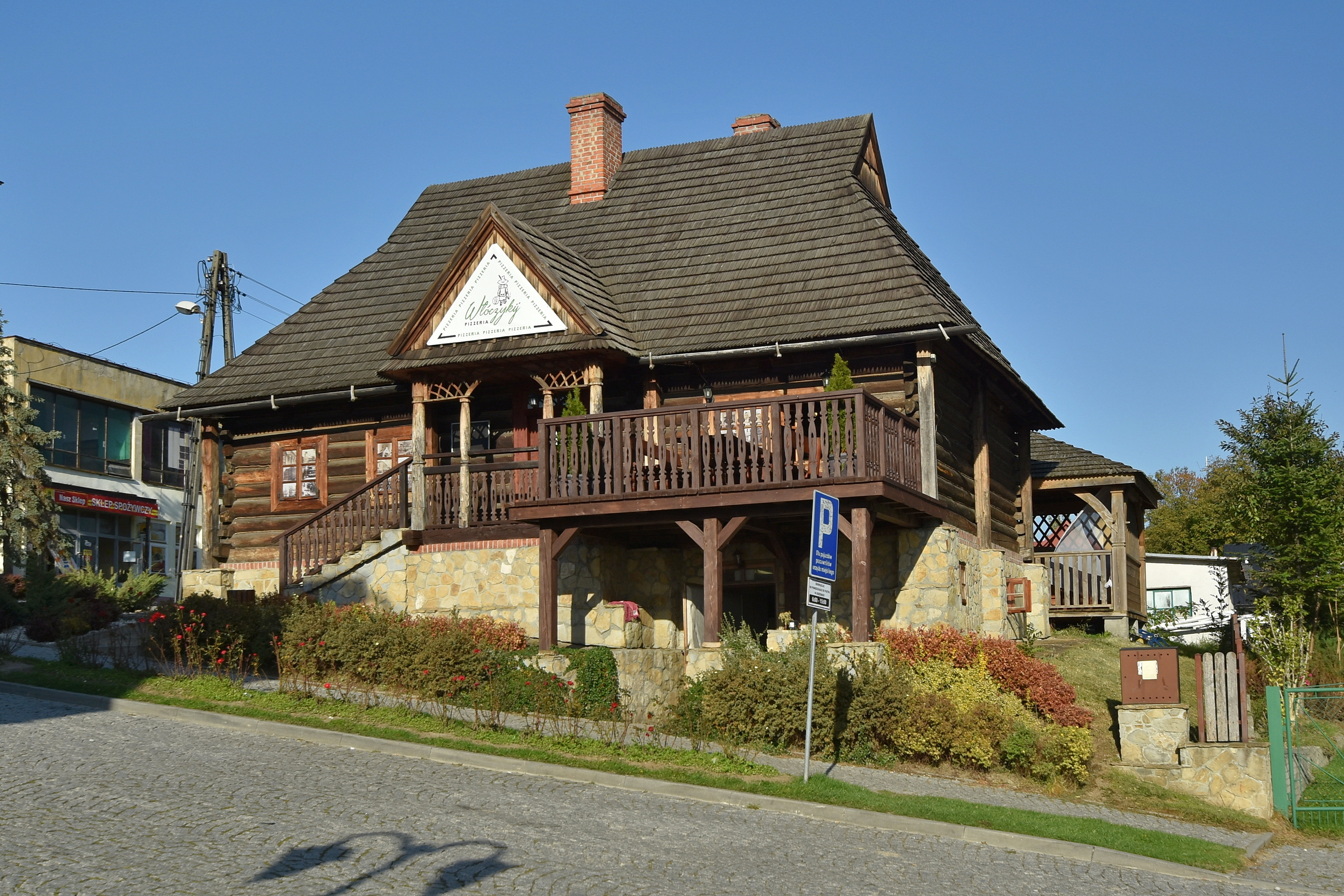
