= Rozbórz Długi =

- Village
- Location within Poland
- Coordinates: 49°57′N 22°31′E
- Country: Poland
- Voivodeship: Subcarpathian
- County: Jarosław
- Gmina: Pruchnik

Rozbórz Długi [ˈrɔzbuʂ ˈdwuɡʲi] is a village in the administrative district of Gmina Pruchnik, within Jarosław County, Subcarpathian Voivodeship, in south-eastern Poland.
