= Rokietnica =

Rokietnica may refer to:

- Rokietnica, Subcarpathian Voivodeship
  - Gmina Rokietnica, Subcarpathian Voivodeship
- Rokietnica, Greater Poland Voivodeship
  - Gmina Rokietnica, Greater Poland Voivodeship

== See also ==
- Gmina Rokietnica (disambiguation)
