= Nienowice =

- Village
- Location within Poland
- Coordinates: 49°56′N 22°56′E
- Country: Poland
- Voivodeship: Subcarpathian
- County: Jarosław
- Gmina: Radymno

Nienowice [ɲɛnɔˈvʲit͡sɛ] is a village in the administrative district of Gmina Radymno, within Jarosław County, Subcarpathian Voivodeship, in south-eastern Poland, close to the border with Ukraine.
