= Chorzów, Podkarpackie Voivodeship =

Chorzów
- Village
- Location within Poland
- Coordinates: 49°54′N 22°33′E
- Country: Poland
- Voivodeship: Subcarpathian
- County: Jarosław
- Gmina: Roźwienica

Chorzów (Polish: [ˈxɔʐuf]) is a village in the administrative district of Gmina Roźwienica, within Jarosław County, Subcarpathian Voivodeship, in south-eastern Poland.
