= Munina =

- Village
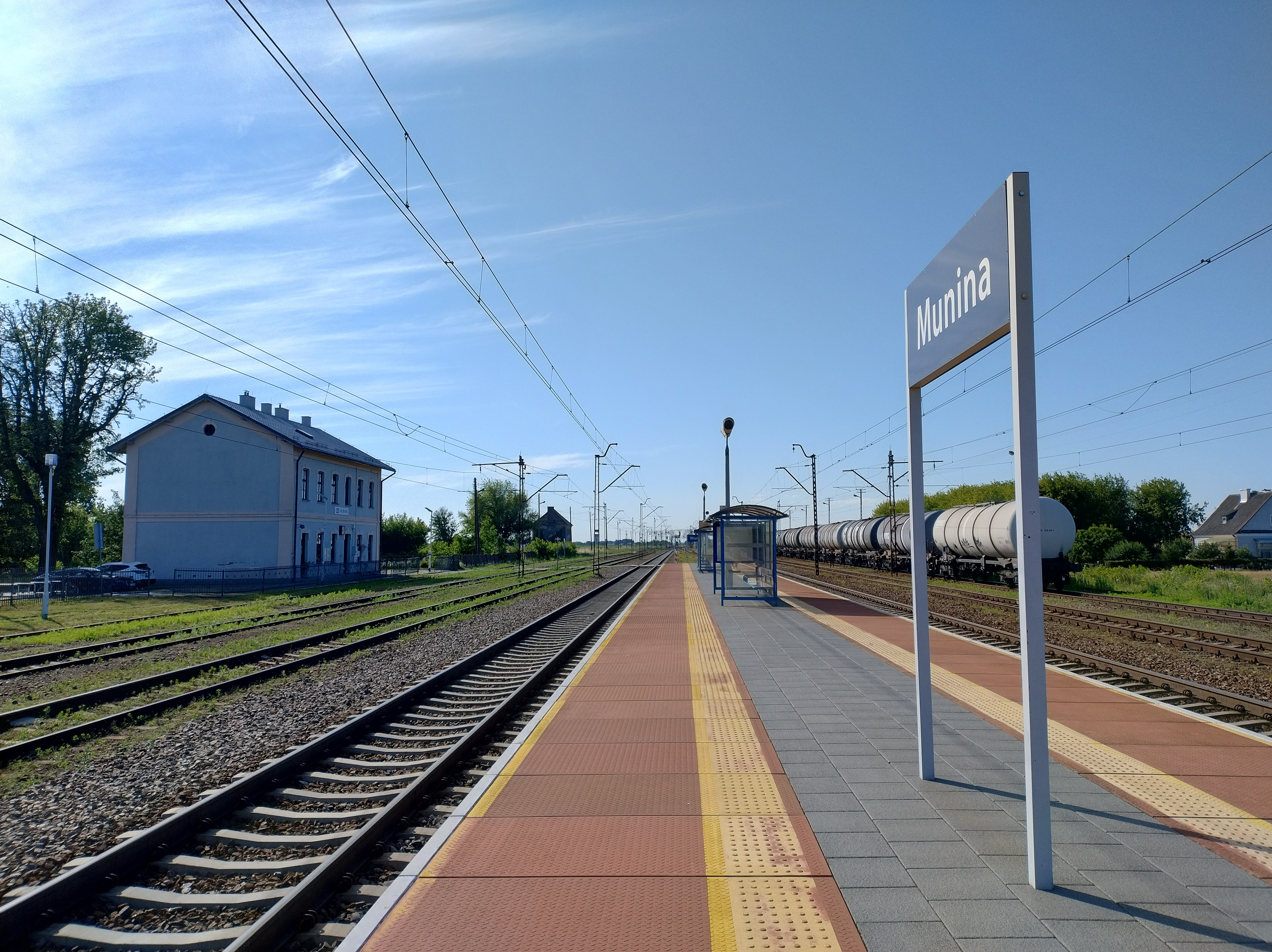
- Munina train station

- Location within Poland
- Coordinates: 49°59′N 22°45′E
- Country: Poland
- Voivodeship: Subcarpathian
- County: Jarosław
- Gmina: Jarosław
- Time zone: UTC+1 (CET)
  - Summer (DST): UTC+2 (CEST)
- Vehicle registration: RJA

Munina [muˈɲina] is a village in the administrative district of Gmina Jarosław, within Jarosław County, Subcarpathian Voivodeship, in south-eastern Poland, 4 kilometres (2.5 mi) east of Jarosław.

It is a railroad junction, situated on the main Kraków-Medyka line. Also, in Munina begins another connection, a branch line (pl) to Hrebenne.

Four Polish citizens were murdered by Nazi Germany in the village during World War II.
