= Miękisz Nowy =

- Village
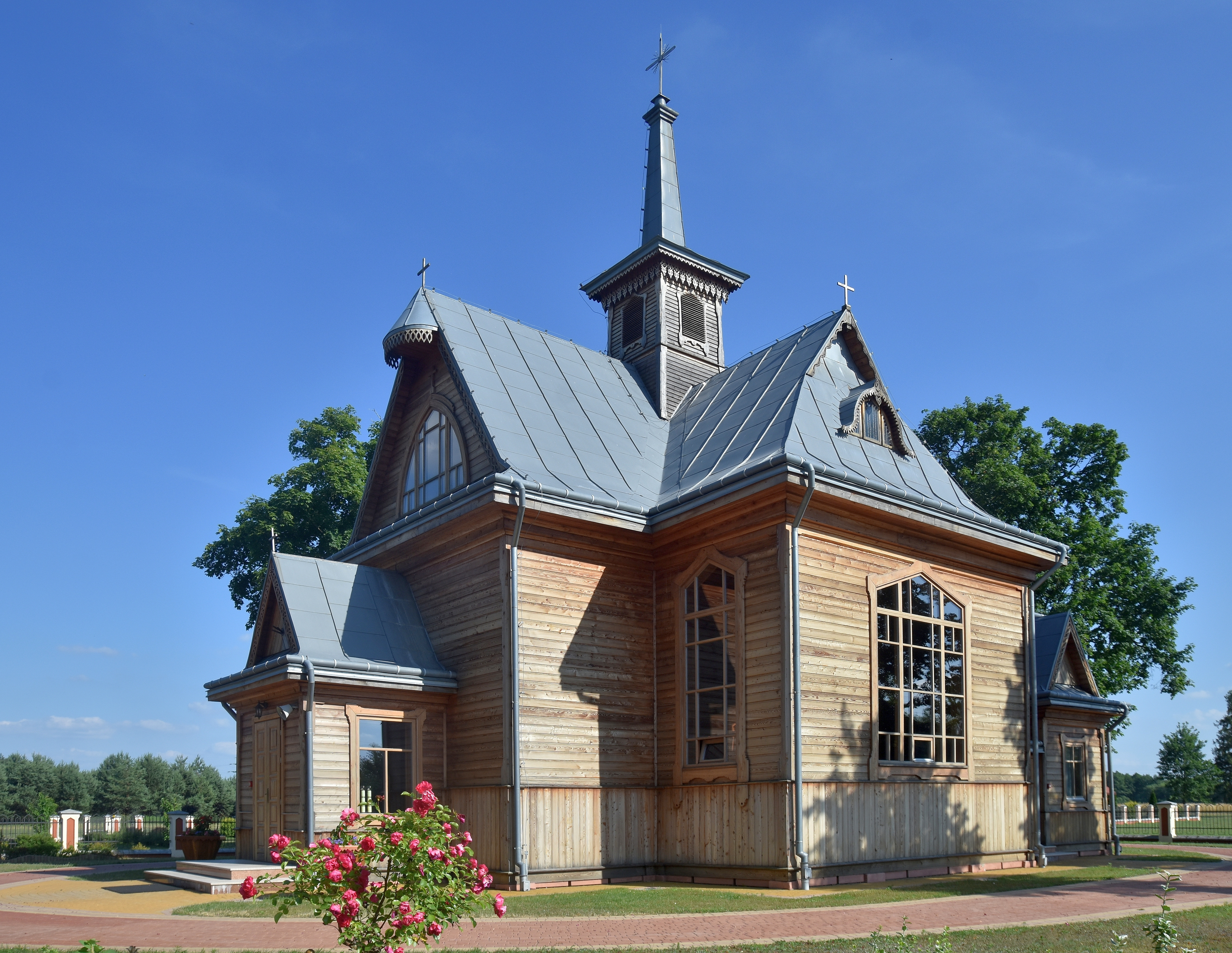

- Location within Poland
- Coordinates: 50°2′N 22°58′E
- Country: Poland
- Voivodeship: Subcarpathian
- County: Jarosław
- Gmina: Laszki
- Population: 680

Miękisz Nowy [ˈmʲɛŋkʲiʂ ˈnɔvɨ] is a village in the administrative district of Gmina Laszki, within Jarosław County, Subcarpathian Voivodeship, in south-eastern Poland.
