= Wola Roźwienicka =

- Village
- Location within Poland
- Coordinates: 49°52′N 22°38′E
- Country: Poland
- Voivodeship: Subcarpathian
- County: Jarosław
- Gmina: Roźwienica

Wola Roźwienicka [ˈvɔla rɔʑvʲɛˈɲit͡ska] is a village in the administrative district of Gmina Roźwienica, within Jarosław County, Subcarpathian Voivodeship, in south-eastern Poland.
