= Wola Rokietnicka =

- Village
- Location within Poland
- Coordinates: 49°52′21″N 22°38′6″E
- Country: Poland
- Voivodeship: Subcarpathian
- County: Jarosław
- Gmina: Rokietnica

Wola Rokietnicka [ˈvɔla rɔkʲɛtˈɲit͡ska] is a village in the administrative district of Gmina Rokietnica, within Jarosław County, Subcarpathian Voivodeship, in south-eastern Poland.
