= Widna Góra, Podkarpackie Voivodeship =

Widna Góra
- Village
- Location within Poland
- Coordinates: 49°59′N 22°40′E
- Country: Poland
- Voivodeship: Subcarpathian
- County: Jarosław
- Gmina: Pawłosiów

Widna Góra [ˈvidna ˈɡura] is a village in the administrative district of Gmina Pawłosiów, within Jarosław County, Subcarpathian Voivodeship, in south-eastern Poland.
