= Wietlin Pierwszy =

- Village
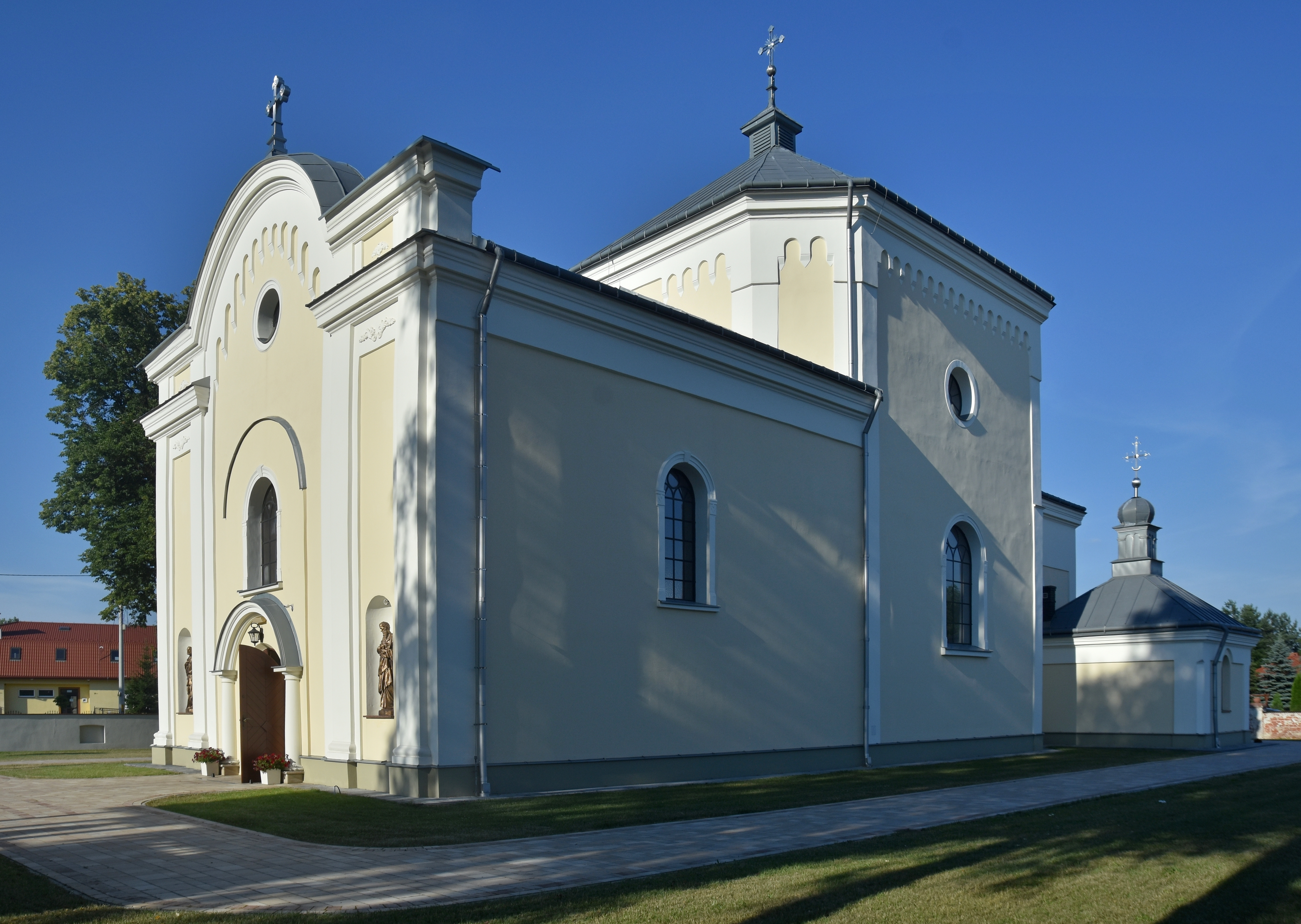

- Location within Poland
- Coordinates: 50°00′45″N 22°50′15″E
- Country: Poland
- Voivodeship: Subcarpathian
- County: Jarosław
- Gmina: Laszki

Wietlin Pierwszy [ˈvʲɛtlʲin ˈpʲɛrfʂɨ] is a village in the administrative district of Gmina Laszki, within Jarosław County, Subcarpathian Voivodeship, in south-eastern Poland.
