= Boratyn, Podkarpackie Voivodeship =

Boratyn
- Village
- Location within Poland
- Coordinates: 49°56′17″N 22°39′39″E
- Country: Poland
- Voivodeship: Subcarpathian
- County: Jarosław
- Gmina: Chłopice
- Website: Boratyn.underlegend.net

Boratyn [bɔˈratɨn] is a village in the administrative district of Gmina Chłopice, within Jarosław County, Subcarpathian Voivodeship, in south-eastern Poland. It lies approximately 4 km (2 mi) south-west of Chłopice, 10 km (6 mi) south of Jarosław, and 49 km (30 mi) east of the regional capital Rzeszów.
