= Święte, Podkarpackie Voivodeship =

Święte
- Village
- Location within Poland
- Coordinates: 49°55′N 22°51′E
- Country: Poland
- Voivodeship: Subcarpathian
- County: Jarosław
- Gmina: Radymno

Święte (Polish: [ˈɕfjɛntɛ]) is a village in the administrative district of Gmina Radymno, within Jarosław County, Subcarpathian Voivodeship, in south-eastern Poland, close to the border with Ukraine.
