= Wietlin-Osada =

- Village
- Location within Poland
- Coordinates: 50°02′05″N 22°48′48″E
- Country: Poland
- Voivodeship: Podkarpackie
- County: Jarosław
- Gmina: Laszki

Wietlin-Osada [ˈvʲɛtlʲin ɔˈsada] is a village in the administrative district of Gmina Laszki, within Jarosław County, Podkarpackie Voivodeship, in south-eastern Poland.
