= Maleniska, Jarosław County =

Maleniska
- Village
- Location within Poland
- Coordinates: 50°0′N 22°37′E
- Country: Poland
- Voivodeship: Subcarpathian
- County: Jarosław
- Gmina: Pawłosiów

Maleniska [malɛˈnʲiska] is a village in the administrative district of Gmina Pawłosiów, within Jarosław County, Subcarpathian Voivodeship, in south-eastern Poland.
