= Cieszacin Wielki =

- Village
- Location within Poland
- Coordinates: 49°59′30″N 22°35′27″E
- Country: Poland
- Voivodeship: Subcarpathian
- County: Jarosław
- Gmina: Pawłosiów

Cieszacin Wielki (Polish pronunciation: [t͡ɕɛˈʂat͡ɕin ˈvjɛlkʲi]) is a village in the administrative district of Gmina Pawłosiów, within Jarosław County, Subcarpathian Voivodeship, in south-eastern Poland.
