= Kidałowice =

- Village
- Location within Poland
- Coordinates: 49°59′N 22°40′E
- Country: Poland
- Voivodeship: Subcarpathian
- County: Jarosław
- Gmina: Pawłosiów
- Population: 1,600

Kidałowice [kʲidawɔˈvʲit͡sɛ] is a village in the administrative district of Gmina Pawłosiów, within Jarosław County, Subcarpathian Voivodeship, in south-eastern Poland.
