= Radawa =

- Village
- Location within Poland
- Coordinates: 50°8′N 22°46′E
- Country: Poland
- Voivodeship: Subcarpathian
- County: Jarosław
- Gmina: Wiązownica

Radawa [raˈdava] is a village in the administrative district of Gmina Wiązownica, within Jarosław County, Subcarpathian Voivodeship, in south-eastern Poland.
