= Makowisko =

- Village
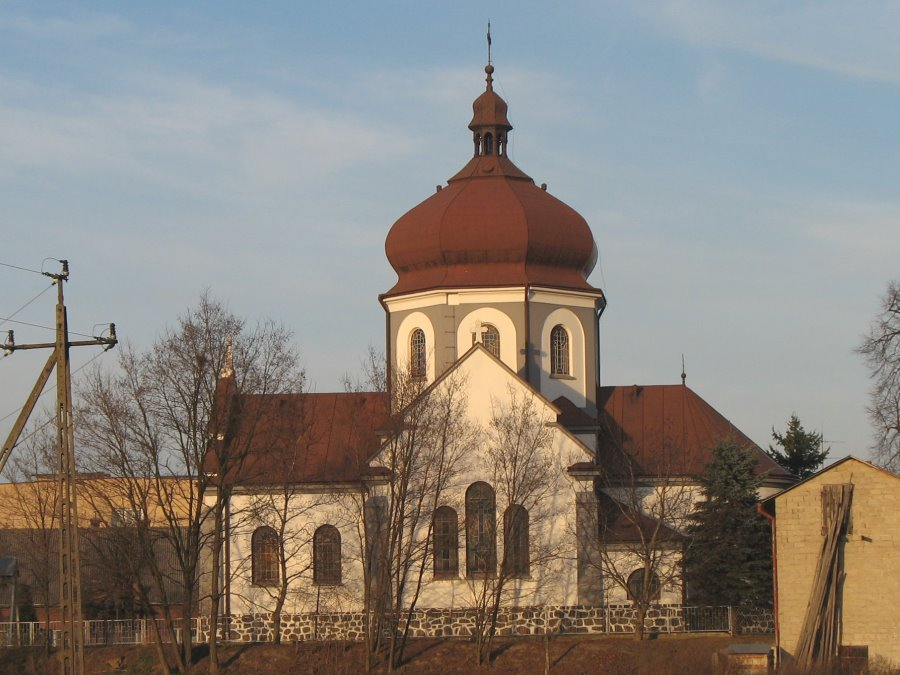
- Greek Catholic church

- Location within Poland
- Coordinates: 50°3′N 22°49′E
- Country: Poland
- Voivodeship: Subcarpathian
- County: Jarosław
- Gmina: Jarosław

Makowisko [makɔˈvʲiskɔ] is a village in the administrative district of Gmina Jarosław, within Jarosław County, Subcarpathian Voivodeship, in south-eastern Poland.
