= Wólka Pełkińska =

- Village
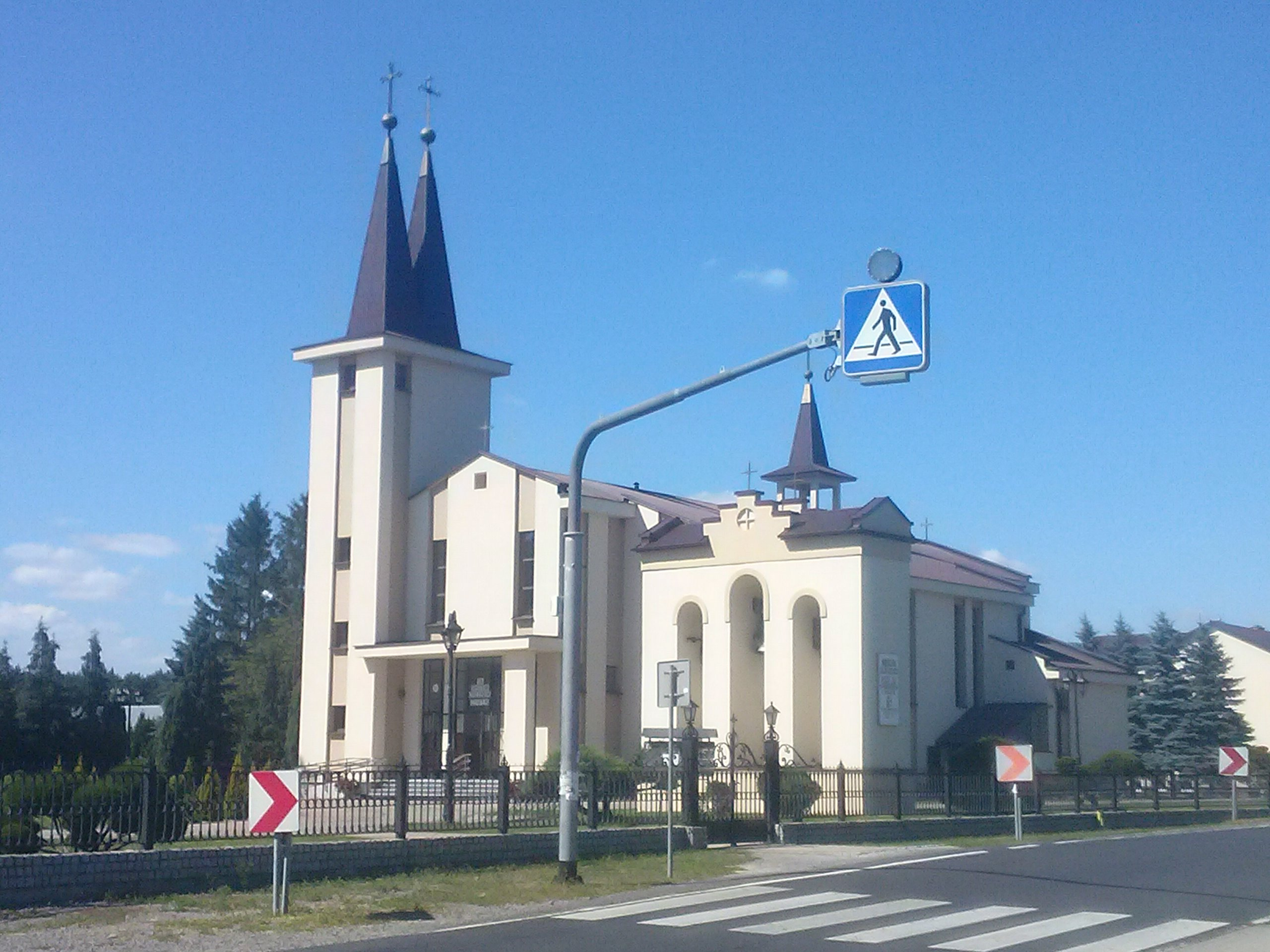
- Church of Saint Stanislaus

- Location within Poland
- Coordinates: 50°5′N 22°37′E
- Country: Poland
- Voivodeship: Subcarpathian
- County: Jarosław
- Gmina: Jarosław

Population
  - Total: 1,500

Wólka Pełkińska [ˈvulka pɛu̯ˈkʲiɲska] is a village in the administrative district of Gmina Jarosław, within Jarosław County, Subcarpathian Voivodeship, in southeastern Poland.
