= Szówsko =

- Village
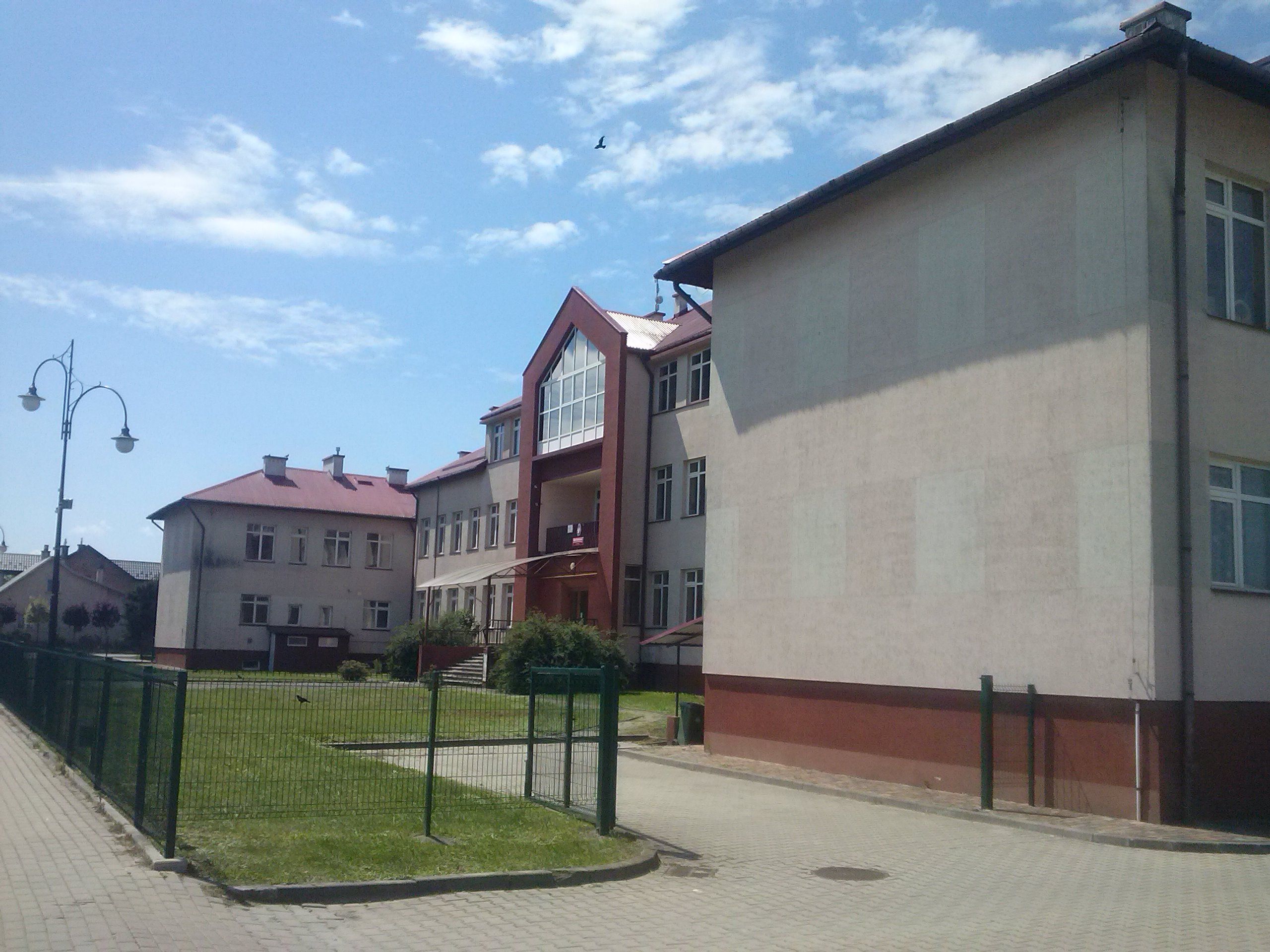
- Elementary school in Szówsko

- Location within Poland
- Coordinates: 50°3′N 22°43′E
- Country: Poland
- Voivodeship: Subcarpathian
- County: Jarosław
- Gmina: Wiązownica

Population
  - Total: 3,096
- Time zone: UTC+1 (CET)
  - Summer (DST): UTC+2 (CEST)

Szówsko [ˈʂufskɔ] is a village in the administrative district of Gmina Wiązownica, within Jarosław County, Subcarpathian Voivodeship, in south-eastern Poland.

== Name ==
There are two etymologies that are hypothesized for the name Szówsko. The first being from the term "szuwary". Szówsko is situated on the eastern bank of the San River and the area was affected greatly through the Middle Ages by flood. With these floods, the area was covered with rushes of coastal reed plants, known as szuwary in Polish. The second hypothesis is derived from the word "suszyć" - or dry. The inhabitants of the area were obliged to deliver dried meat (suszyć) and fruits to Jarosław

== History ==
One of the first mentions of Szówsko in official documents was when King Władysław Jagiełło granted a castle, Jarosław, and the surrounding villages to Jan of Tarnów on 27 November 1387.

Later, in 1473, King Casimir IV Jagiellon approved the first Jarosław estate to Rafał Ordynacja Jarosławska of Lwów. Rafal received several villages with Szówsko named fifth behind Tuczempach, Korzenica, Laszkach and Radawa.

On 1 June 1523, a church was established in Jarosław, for which the inhabitants of Szówsko were tithe. Over the following years, Szówsko would pay land tax to the collectors of Przemyśl.

With the climate changing and the forests shrinking, around 1860, the San River underwent a major change, become a small river, its waters far below its steep banks.

Through the 1800s, the Czartoryski family developed much of Szówsko with farm buildings, a distillery and a cheese factory. It wasn't until 1936 that the Czartoryski estate was parceled out, bought mostly by local peasants. Włodzimierz Alfons Czartoryski was the last owner of the Szówsko industrial estate before it was confiscated by communist decree of naturalization on 3 January 1946.

Five Polish citizens were murdered by Nazi Germany in the village during World War II.
