= Lutków =

- Village
- Location within Poland
- Coordinates: 49°55′N 22°45′E
- Country: Poland
- Voivodeship: Subcarpathian
- County: Jarosław
- Gmina: Chłopice

Lutków [ˈlutkuf] is a village in the administrative district of Gmina Chłopice, within Jarosław County, Subcarpathian Voivodeship, in south-eastern Poland.
