= Zamojsce =

- Village
- Location within Poland
- Coordinates: 49°55′12″N 22°48′0″E
- Country: Poland
- Voivodeship: Subcarpathian
- County: Jarosław
- Gmina: Radymno
- Elevation: 200 m (660 ft)
- Population: 290

Zamojsce [zaˈmɔi̯st͡sɛ] is a village in the administrative district of Gmina Radymno, within Jarosław County, Subcarpathian Voivodeship, in south-eastern Poland, close to the border with Ukraine.
