= Nielepkowice =

- Village
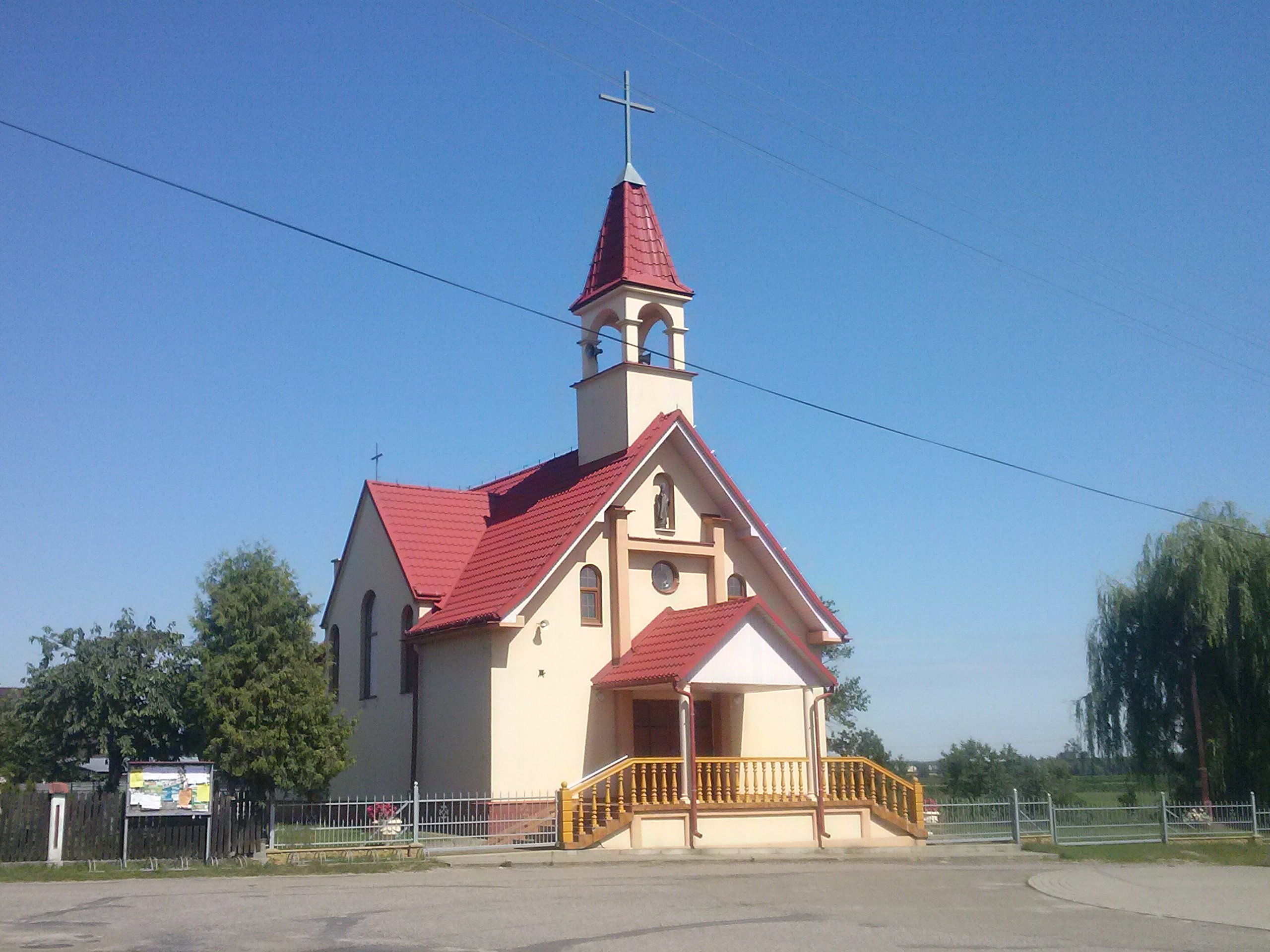
- Church in Nielepkowice

- Location within Poland
- Coordinates: 50°6′N 22°40′E
- Country: Poland
- Voivodeship: Subcarpathian
- County: Jarosław
- Gmina: Wiązownica
- Elevation: 180 m (590 ft)

Population (approx.)
  - Total: 420

Nielepkowice [ɲɛlɛpkɔˈvʲit͡sɛ] is a village in the administrative district of Gmina Wiązownica, within Jarosław County, Subcarpathian Voivodeship, in south-eastern Poland.
