= Zgoda, Podkarpackie Voivodeship =

Zgoda
- Village
- Location within Poland
- Coordinates: 50°0′N 22°45′E
- Country: Poland
- Voivodeship: Subcarpathian
- County: Jarosław
- Gmina: Jarosław

Zgoda [ˈzɡɔda] is a village in the administrative district of Gmina Jarosław, within Jarosław County, Subcarpathian Voivodeship, in south-eastern Poland.
