= Michałówka, Podkarpackie Voivodeship =

Michałówka
- Village
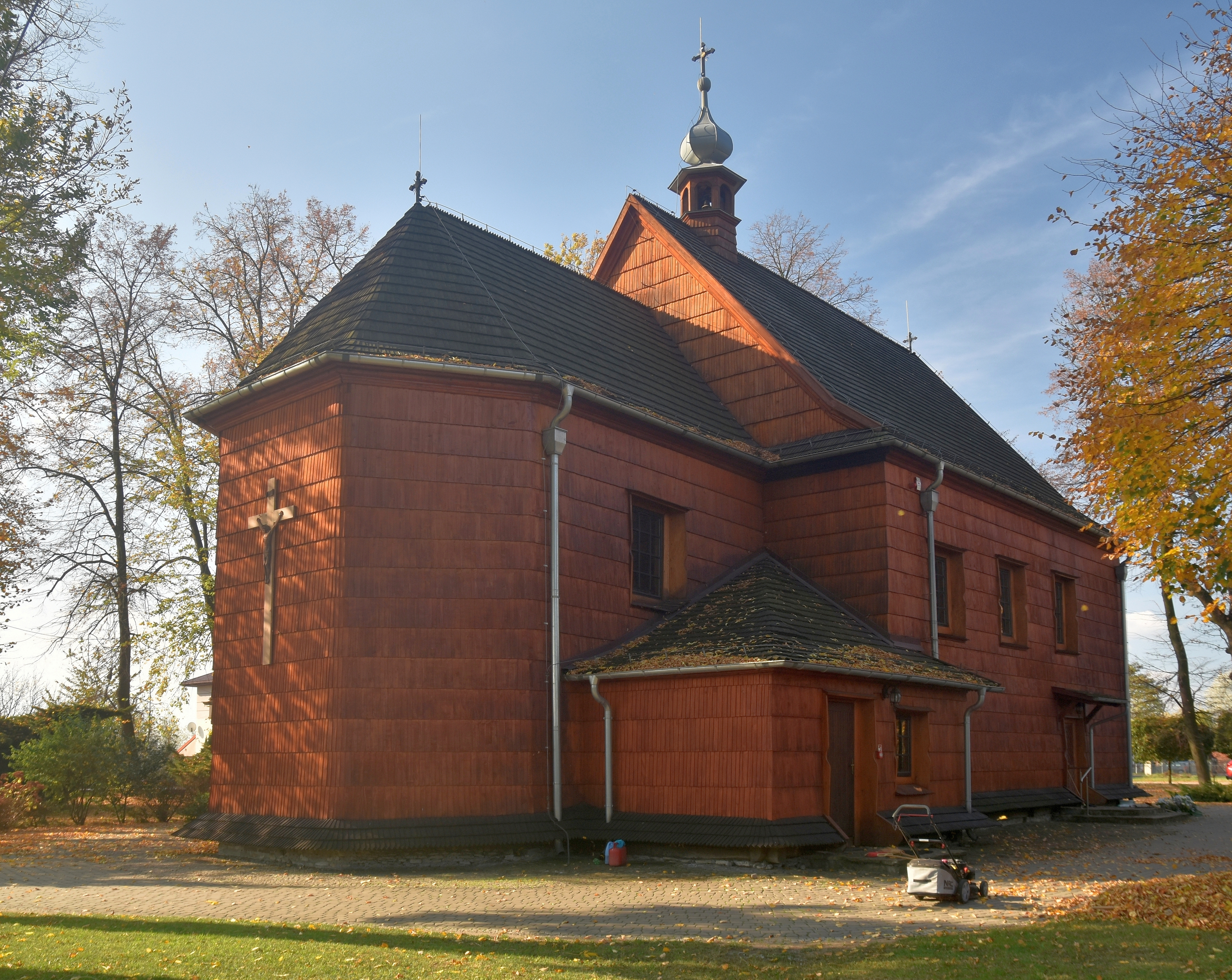
- St. Michael the Archangel Church Complex, Michałówka.

- Location within Poland
- Coordinates: 49°57′1″N 22°52′42″E
- Country: Poland
- Voivodeship: Subcarpathian
- County: Jarosław
- Gmina: Radymno

Michałówka [mʲixaˈwufka] is a village in the administrative district of Gmina Radymno, within Jarosław County, Subcarpathian Voivodeship, in south-eastern Poland, close to the border with Ukraine.

== See also ==
- Walddeutsche
