= Miękisz Stary =

- Village
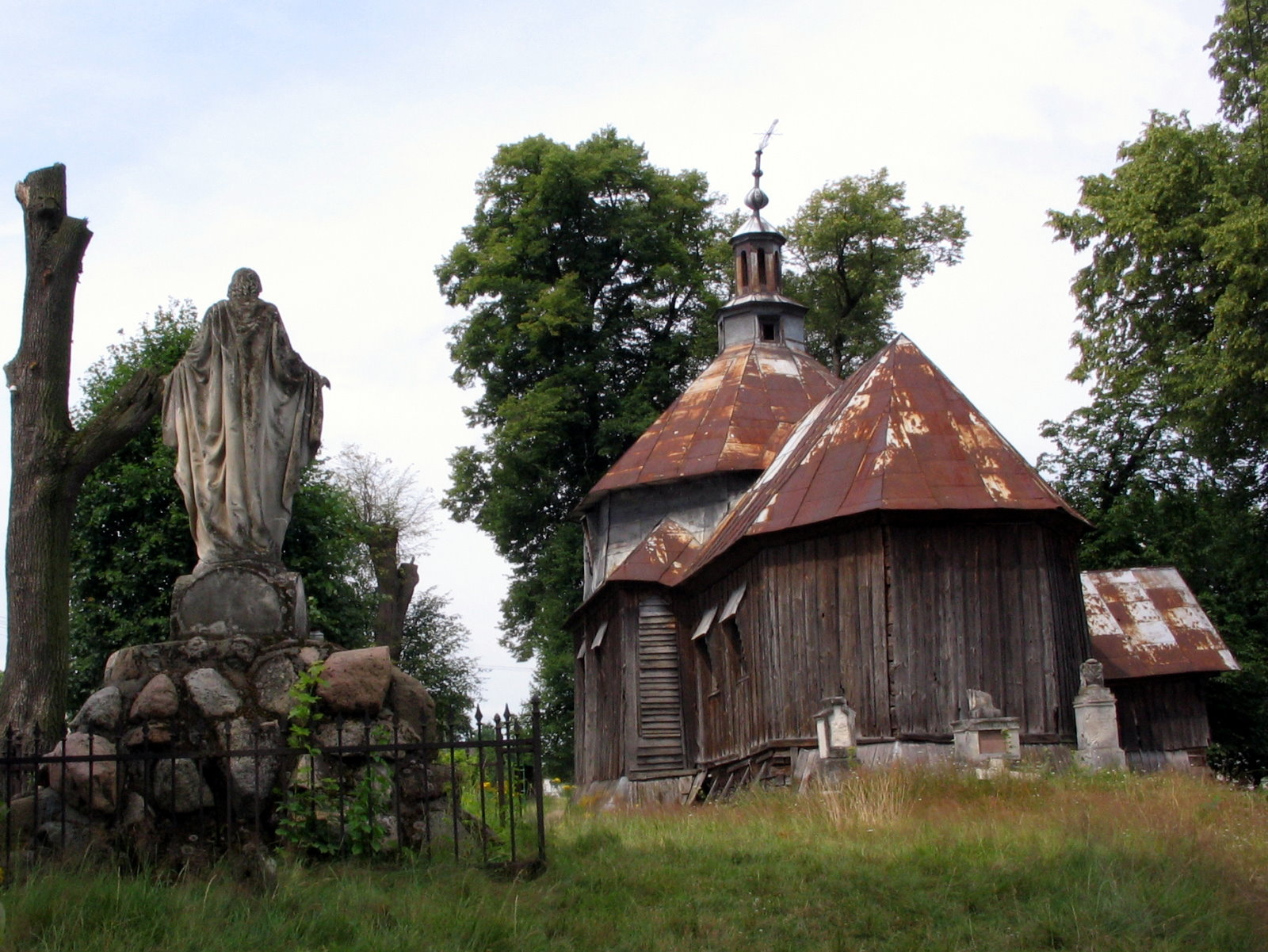
- Greek Catholic church

- Location within Poland
- Coordinates: 50°1′N 22°57′E
- Country: Poland
- Voivodeship: Subcarpathian
- County: Jarosław
- Gmina: Laszki

Miękisz Stary [ˈmʲɛŋkʲiʂ ˈstarɨ] is a village in the administrative district of Gmina Laszki, within Jarosław County, Subcarpathian Voivodeship, in south-eastern Poland.
