= Węgierka =

- Village
- Location within Poland
- Coordinates: 49°54′N 22°33′E
- Country: Poland
- Voivodeship: Subcarpathian
- County: Jarosław
- Gmina: Roźwienica
- Population: 940

Węgierka [vɛŋˈɡʲɛrka] is a village in the administrative district of Gmina Roźwienica, within Jarosław County, Subcarpathian Voivodeship, in south-eastern Poland.
