= Bukowina, Jarosław County =

Bukowina
- Village
- Location within Poland
- Coordinates: 50°3′1″N 22°57′9″E
- Country: Poland
- Voivodeship: Subcarpathian
- County: Jarosław
- Gmina: Laszki
- Population: 210

Bukowina [bukɔˈvʲina] is a village in the administrative district of Gmina Laszki, within Jarosław County, Subcarpathian Voivodeship, in south-eastern Poland.
