= Tuczempy =

- Village
- Location within Poland
- Coordinates: 49°59′N 22°45′E
- Country: Poland
- Voivodeship: Subcarpathian
- County: Jarosław
- Gmina: Jarosław
- Elevation: 206 m (676 ft)

Tuczempy [tuˈt͡ʂɛmpɨ] is a village in the administrative district of Gmina Jarosław, within Jarosław County, Subcarpathian Voivodeship, in south-eastern Poland.

== Literature ==
- Tadeusz Słaby "Tuczempy. Anthology", Arka Ltd.., Świnoujście, Wrocław, 2009, ISBN 978-83-928576-0-0
