= Tapin =

Tapin may refer to:

- Tapin Regency
- Tapin, Subcarpathian Voivodeship
