= Surmaczówka =

- Village
- Location within Poland
- Coordinates: 50°8′N 22°51′E
- Country: Poland
- Voivodeship: Subcarpathian
- County: Jarosław
- Gmina: Wiązownica

Surmaczówka [surmaˈt͡ʂufka] is a village in the administrative district of Gmina Wiązownica, within Jarosław County, Subcarpathian Voivodeship, in south-eastern Poland.
