= Tuligłowy, Podkarpackie Voivodeship =

Tuligłowy
- Village
- Interactive map of Tuligłowy
- Location within Poland
- Coordinates: 49°53′N 22°36′E
- Country: Poland
- Voivodeship: Subcarpathian
- County: Jarosław
- Gmina: Rokietnica

Tuligłowy [tulʲiˈɡwɔvɨ] is a village in the administrative district of Gmina Rokietnica, within Jarosław County, Subcarpathian Voivodeship, in south-eastern Poland.
