= Wierzbna, Podkarpackie Voivodeship =

Wierzbna
- Village
- Location within Poland
- Coordinates: 50°1′N 22°36′E
- Country: Poland
- Voivodeship: Subcarpathian
- County: Jarosław
- Gmina: Pawłosiów
- Website: http://www.wierzbna.boo.pl/

Wierzbna [ˈvʲɛʐbna] is a village in the administrative district of Gmina Pawłosiów, within Jarosław County, Subcarpathian Voivodeship, in south-eastern Poland.
