= Mołodycz =

- Village
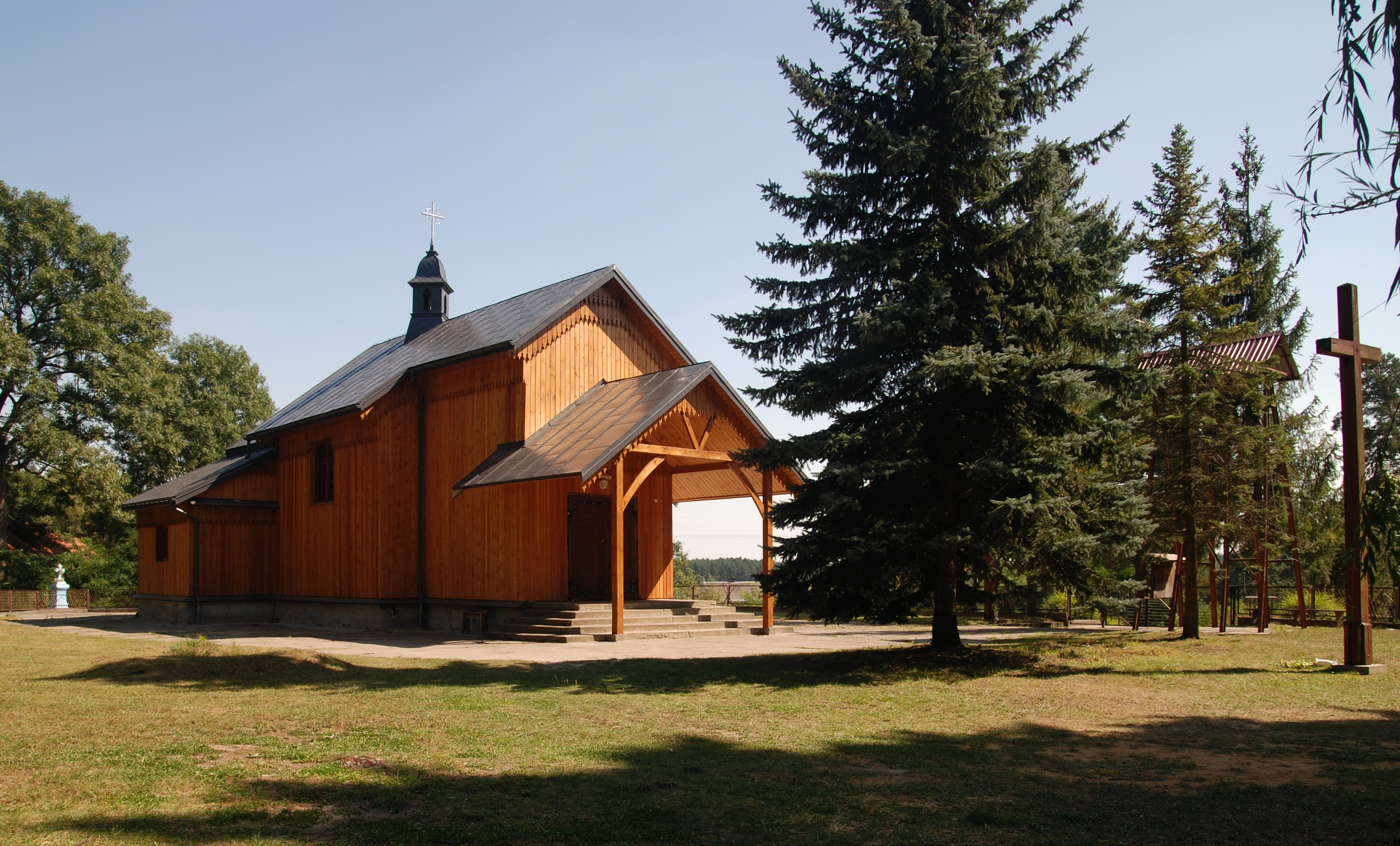
- Church of the Nativity of the Blessed Virgin Mary in Mołodycz

- Location within Poland
- Coordinates: 50°9′20″N 22°49′4″E
- Country: Poland
- Voivodeship: Subcarpathian
- County: Jarosław
- Gmina: Wiązownica
- Time zone: UTC+1 (CET)
  - Summer (DST): UTC+2 (CEST)
- Vehicle registration: RJA

Mołodycz [mɔˈwɔdɨt͡ʂ] is a village in the administrative district of Gmina Wiązownica, within Jarosław County, Subcarpathian Voivodeship, in south-eastern Poland.

Five Polish citizens were murdered by Nazi Germany in the village during World War II.
