= Bobrówka =

Bobrówka may refer to the following places:

- Bobrówka, Hajnówka County in Podlaskie Voivodeship (north-east Poland)
- Bobrówka, Mońki County in Podlaskie Voivodeship (north-east Poland)
- Bobrówka, Subcarpathian Voivodeship (south-east Poland)
