= Zaleska Wola, Podkarpackie Voivodeship =

Zaleska Wola
- Village
- Location within Poland
- Coordinates: 49°59′N 22°59′E
- Country: Poland
- Voivodeship: Subcarpathian
- County: Jarosław
- Gmina: Radymno

Zaleska Wola [zaˈlɛska ˈvɔla] is a village in the administrative district of Gmina Radymno, within Jarosław County, Subcarpathian Voivodeship, in south-eastern Poland, close to the border with Ukraine.

Prior to the deportation of Ukrainians in the region during Operation Vistula there was a Ukrainian Greek-Catholic parish in the village.
