= Jankowice, Podkarpackie Voivodeship =

Jankowice
- Village
- Location within Poland
- Coordinates: 49°57′0″N 22°40′0″E
- Country: Poland
- Voivodeship: Subcarpathian
- County: Jarosław
- Gmina: Chłopice
- Population: 800

Jankowice [jaŋkɔˈvʲit͡sɛ] is a village in the administrative district of Gmina Chłopice, within Jarosław County, Subcarpathian Voivodeship, in south-eastern Poland.
