= Sośnica-Brzeg, Podkarpackie Voivodeship =

Sośnica-Brzeg
- Village
- Location within Poland
- Coordinates: 49°54′1″N 22°52′30″E
- Country: Poland
- Voivodeship: Subcarpathian
- County: Jarosław
- Gmina: Radymno

Sośnica-Brzeg [sɔɕˈɲit͡sa ˈbʐɛk] is a village in the administrative district of Gmina Radymno, within Jarosław County, Subcarpathian Voivodeship, in south-eastern Poland, close to the border with Ukraine.
