= Wietlin =

- Village
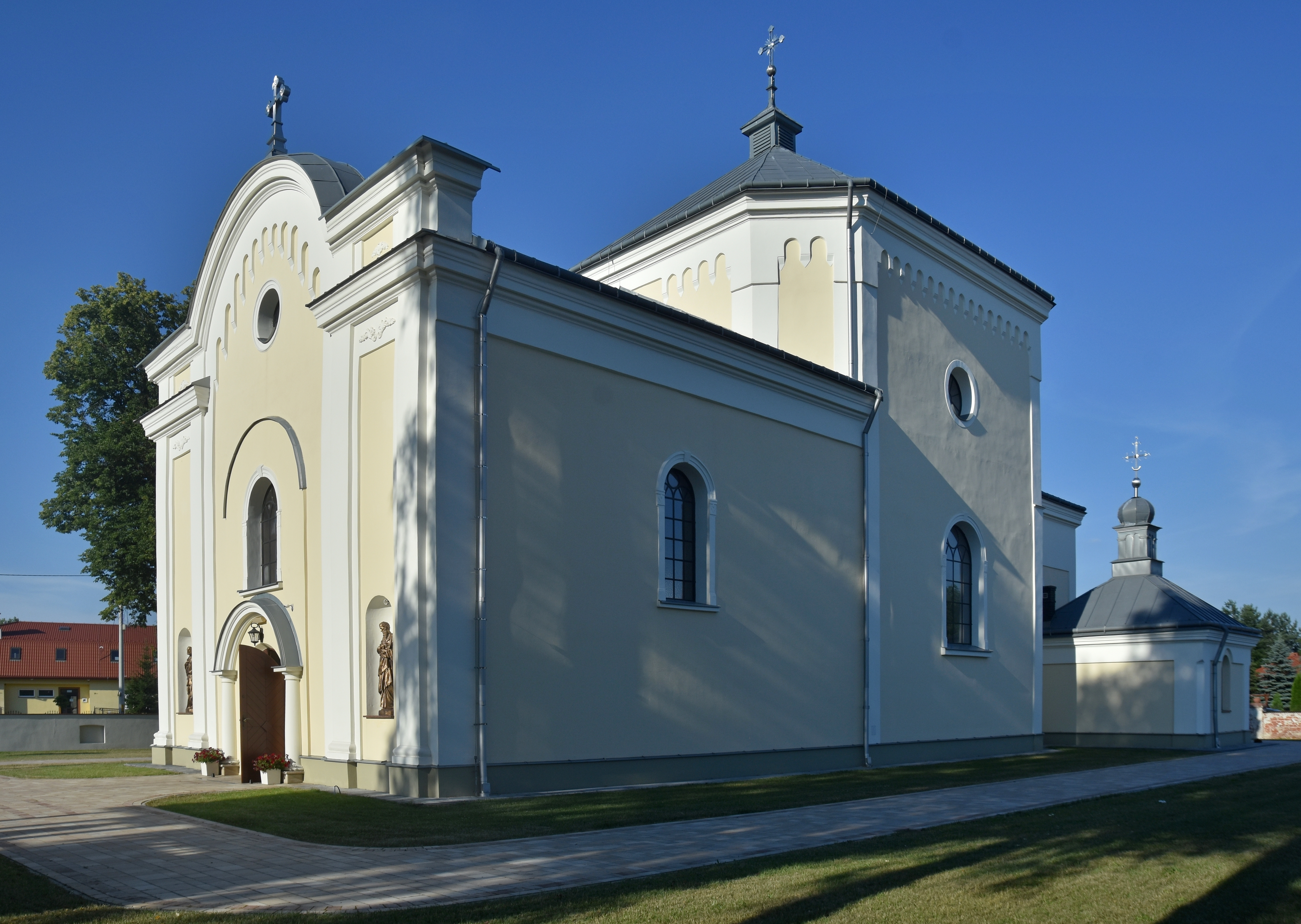

- Location within Poland
- Coordinates: 50°0′13″N 22°48′33″E
- Country: Poland
- Voivodeship: Subcarpathian
- County: Jarosław
- Gmina: Laszki

Wietlin [ˈvʲɛtlʲin] is a village in the administrative district of Gmina Laszki, within Jarosław County, Subcarpathian Voivodeship, in south-eastern Poland.
