= Boratyn =

Boratyn may refer to:

- Boratyn (Subcarpathian Voivodeship), a village in Poland
- Boratyn (Lviv Oblast), a village in Lviv oblast, Ukraine
- Boratyn (Rivne Oblast), a village in Rivne oblast, Ukraine
- Boratyn (Volyn Oblast), a village in Volyn oblast, Ukraine
