= Skołoszów =

- Village
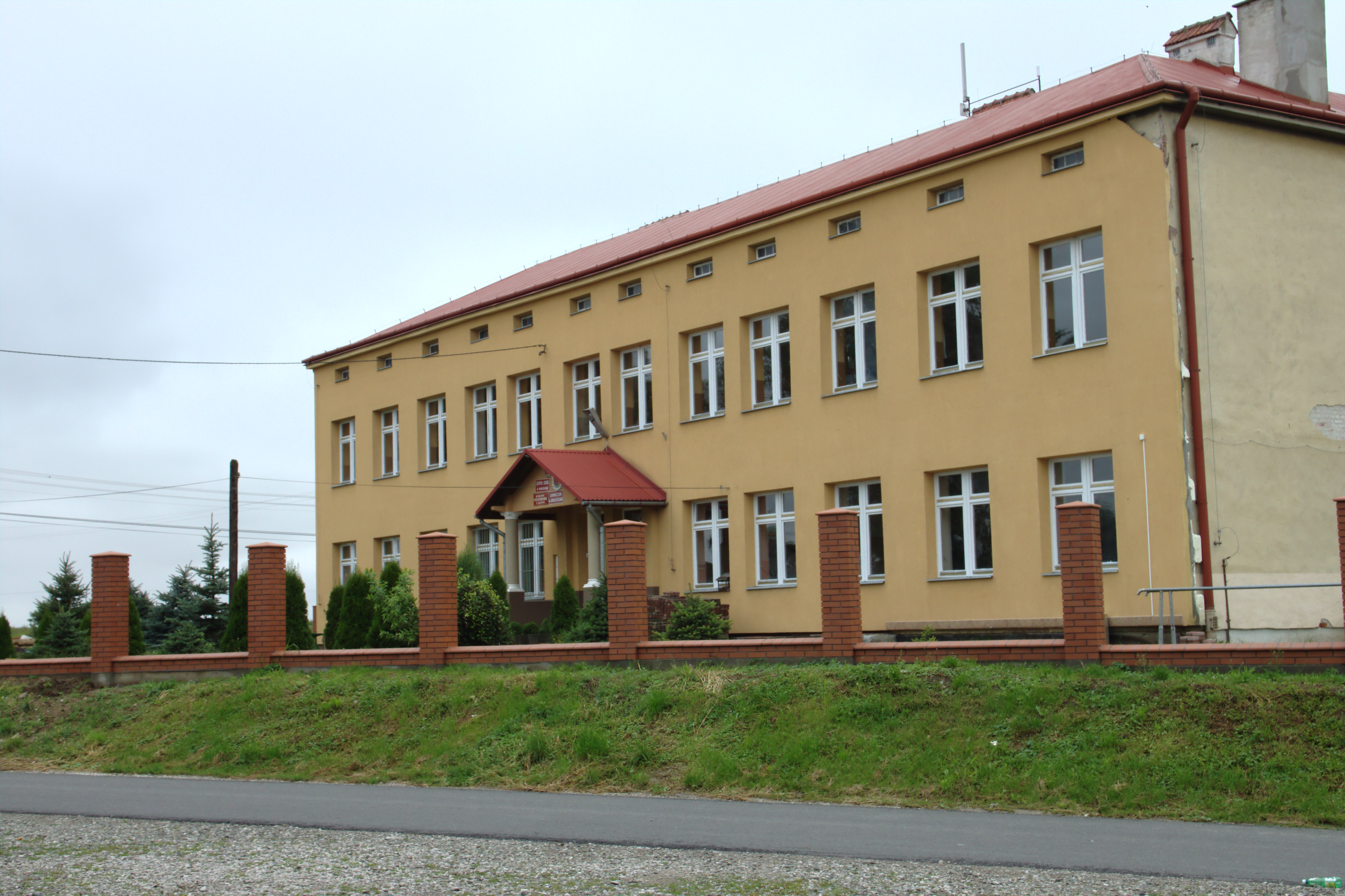
- School in the village

- Location within Poland
- Coordinates: 49°55′N 22°48′E
- Country: Poland
- Voivodeship: Subcarpathian
- County: Jarosław
- Gmina: Radymno
- Elevation: 204.0 m (669.3 ft)

Population
  - Total: 1,583

Skołoszów [skɔˈwɔʂuf] is a village in the administrative district of Gmina Radymno, within Jarosław County, Subcarpathian Voivodeship, in south-eastern Poland, close to the border with Ukraine.
