= Piaski, Podkarpackie Voivodeship =

Piaski
- Village
- Location within Poland
- Coordinates: 49°58′3″N 22°55′5″E
- Country: Poland
- Voivodeship: Subcarpathian
- County: Jarosław
- Gmina: Radymno
- Time zone: UTC+1 (CET)
  - Summer (DST): UTC+2 (CEST)
- Postal code: 37-551
- Vehicle registration: RJA

Piaski (Polish pronunciation: [ˈpjaskʲi]) is a village in the administrative district of Gmina Radymno, within Jarosław County, Subcarpathian Voivodeship, in south-eastern Poland, close to the border with Ukraine.
