= Wola Węgierska =

- Village
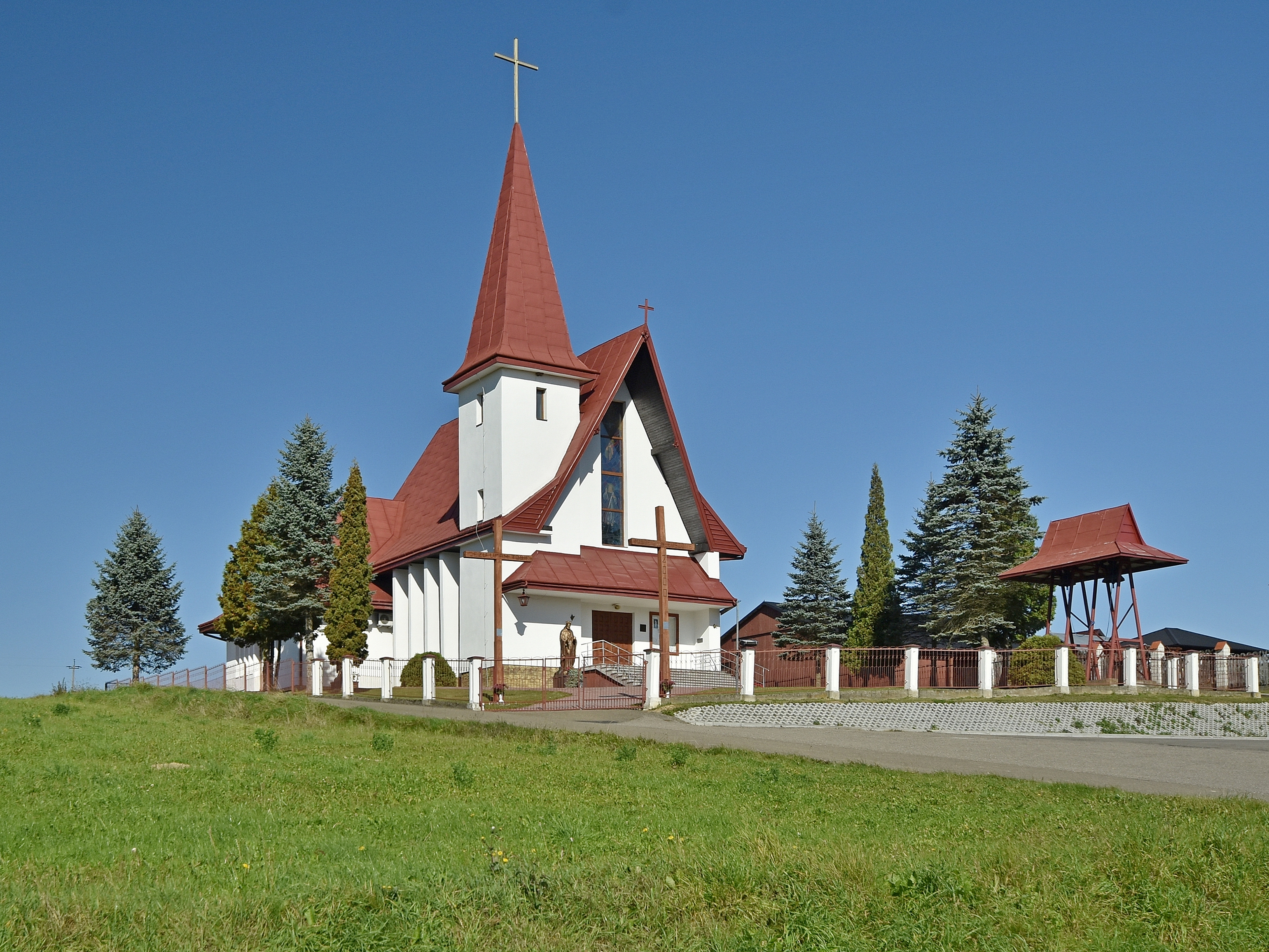

- Location within Poland
- Coordinates: 49°51′N 22°35′E
- Country: Poland
- Voivodeship: Subcarpathian
- County: Jarosław
- Gmina: Roźwienica
- Time zone: UTC+1 (CET)
  - Summer (DST): UTC+2 (CEST)

Wola Węgierska [ˈvɔla vɛŋˈɡʲɛrska] is a village in the administrative district of Gmina Roźwienica, within Jarosław County, Subcarpathian Voivodeship, in south-eastern Poland.

Five Polish citizens were murdered by Nazi Germany in the village during World War II.
