= Charytany =

- Village
- Location within Poland
- Coordinates: 49°59′N 22°57′E
- Country: Poland
- Voivodeship: Subcarpathian
- County: Jarosław
- Gmina: Laszki

Charytany [xarɨˈtanɨ] is a village in the administrative district of Gmina Laszki, within Jarosław County, Subcarpathian Voivodeship, in south-eastern Poland.
