= Duńkowice =

- Village
- Location within Poland
- Coordinates: 49°58′N 22°54′E
- Country: Poland
- Voivodeship: Subcarpathian
- County: Jarosław
- Gmina: Radymno

Duńkowice [duɲkɔˈvʲit͡sɛ] is a village in the administrative district of Gmina Radymno, within Jarosław County, Subcarpathian Voivodeship, in south-eastern Poland, close to the border with Ukraine.
