= Morawsko, Podkarpackie Voivodeship =

Morawsko
- Village
- Location within Poland
- Coordinates: 49°59′N 22°43′E
- Country: Poland
- Voivodeship: Subcarpathian
- County: Jarosław
- Gmina: Jarosław

Morawsko [mɔˈrafskɔ] is a village in the administrative district of Gmina Jarosław, within Jarosław County, Subcarpathian Voivodeship, in south-eastern Poland.
