= Leżachów-Osada =

- Village
- Location within Poland
- Coordinates: 50°8′N 22°37′E
- Country: Poland
- Voivodeship: Subcarpathian
- County: Jarosław
- Gmina: Jarosław

Leżachów-Osada [lɛˈʐaxuf ɔˈsada] is a village in the administrative district of Gmina Jarosław, within Jarosław County, Subcarpathian Voivodeship, in south-eastern Poland.
