= Korzenica, Podkarpackie Voivodeship =

Korzenica
- Village
- Location within Poland
- Coordinates: 50°2′N 22°56′E
- Country: Poland
- Voivodeship: Subcarpathian
- County: Jarosław
- Gmina: Laszki

Korzenica [kɔʐɛˈɲit͡sa] is a village in the administrative district of Gmina Laszki, within Jarosław County, Subcarpathian Voivodeship, in south-eastern Poland.
