= Łowce =

- Village
- Location within Poland
- Coordinates: 49°56′N 22°44′E
- Country: Poland
- Voivodeship: Subcarpathian
- County: Jarosław
- Gmina: Chłopice

Łowce [ˈwɔft͡sɛ] is a village in the administrative district of Gmina Chłopice, within Jarosław County, Subcarpathian Voivodeship, in south-eastern Poland.
