= Manasterz, Jarosław County =

Manasterz
- Village
- Location within Poland
- Coordinates: 50°7′8″N 22°39′58″E
- Country: Poland
- Voivodeship: Subcarpathian
- County: Jarosław
- Gmina: Wiązownica
- Population: 712
- Website: http://www.manasterz.yoyo.pl/

Manasterz [maˈnastɛʂ] is a village in the administrative district of Gmina Wiązownica, within Jarosław County, Subcarpathian Voivodeship, in south-eastern Poland.
