= Grabowiec, Podkarpackie Voivodeship =

Grabowiec
- Village
- Location within Poland
- Coordinates: 49°56′4″N 22°52′38″E
- Country: Poland
- Voivodeship: Subcarpathian
- County: Jarosław
- Gmina: Radymno

Grabowiec [ɡraˈbɔvʲɛt͡s] is a village in the administrative district of Gmina Radymno, within Jarosław County, Subcarpathian Voivodeship, in south-eastern Poland, close to the border with Ukraine.
