= Zabłotce, Jarosław County =

Zabłotce
- Village
- Location within Poland
- Coordinates: 49°54′14″N 22°46′56″E
- Country: Poland
- Voivodeship: Subcarpathian
- County: Jarosław
- Gmina: Radymno
- Elevation: 203 m (666 ft)
- Population: 404 (2,020)

Zabłotce [zaˈbwɔtt͡sɛ] is a village in the administrative district of Gmina Radymno, within Jarosław County, Subcarpathian Voivodeship, in south-eastern Poland, close to the border with Ukraine.
