= Ożańsk =

- Village
- Location within Poland
- Coordinates: 50°2′N 22°34′E
- Country: Poland
- Voivodeship: Subcarpathian
- County: Jarosław
- Gmina: Pawłosiów

Ożańsk [ˈɔʐaɲsk] is a village in the administrative district of Gmina Pawłosiów, within Jarosław County, Subcarpathian Voivodeship, in south-eastern Poland.
