= Czelatyce =

- Village
- Location within Poland
- Coordinates: 49°55′N 22°37′E
- Country: Poland
- Voivodeship: Subcarpathian
- County: Jarosław
- Gmina: Rokietnica

Czelatyce [t͡ʂɛlaˈtɨt͡sɛ] is a village in the administrative district of Gmina Rokietnica, within Jarosław County, Subcarpathian Voivodeship, in south-eastern Poland.
