= Tuchla =

- Village
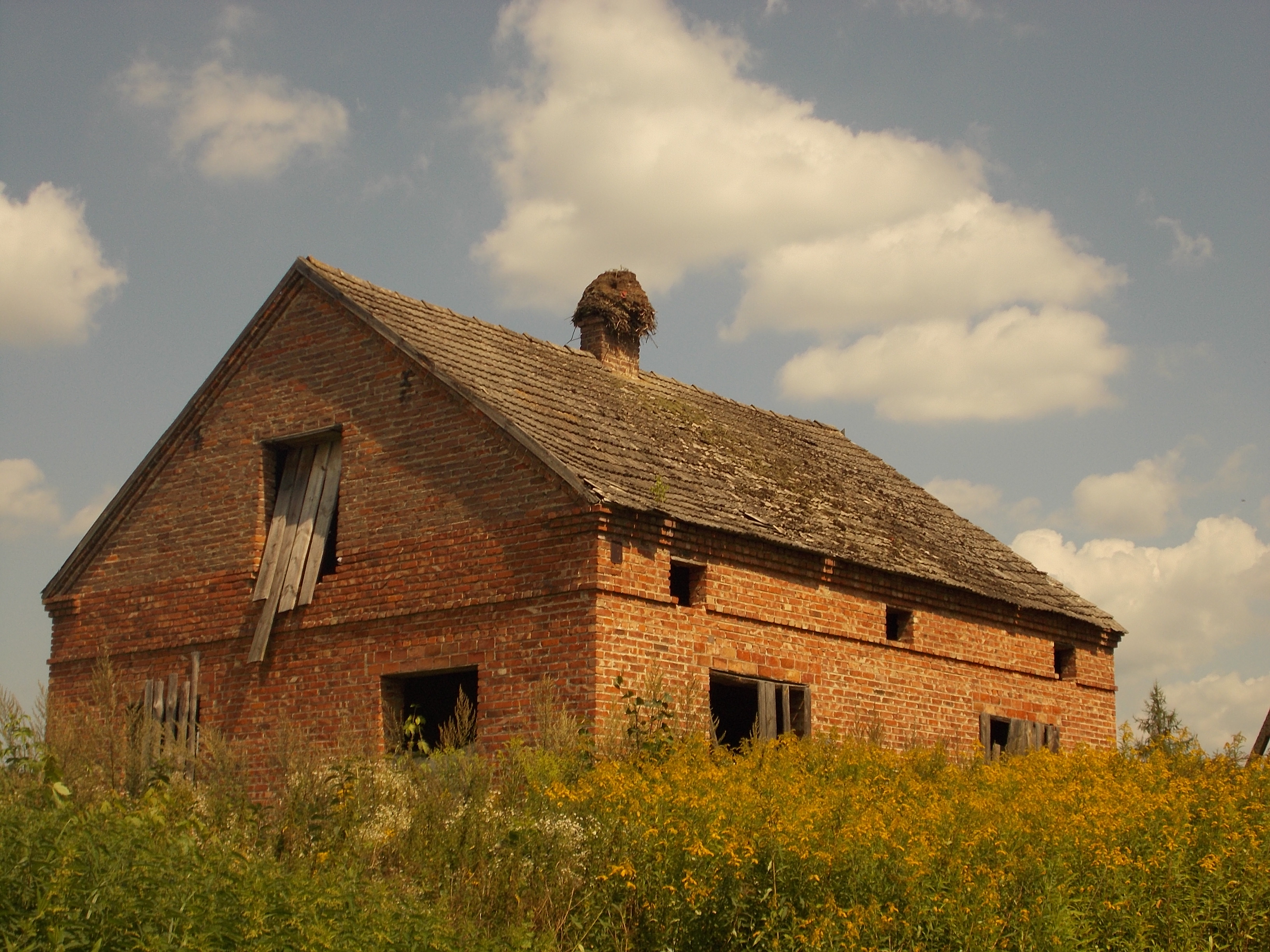

- Location within Poland
- Coordinates: 50°2′N 23°1′E
- Country: Poland
- Voivodeship: Subcarpathian
- County: Jarosław
- Gmina: Laszki

Tuchla [ˈtuxla] is a village in the administrative district of Gmina Laszki, within Jarosław County, Subcarpathian Voivodeship, in south-eastern Poland.
