= Więckowice =

Więckowice may refer to the following places:

- Więckowice, Kraków County in Lesser Poland Voivodeship (south Poland)
- Więckowice, Proszowice County in Lesser Poland Voivodeship (south Poland)
- Więckowice, Tarnów County in Lesser Poland Voivodeship (south Poland)
- Więckowice, Subcarpathian Voivodeship (south-east Poland)
- Więckowice, Greater Poland Voivodeship (west-central Poland)
- Więckowice, Podkarpackie Voivodeship
