= Jacek Bąk (footballer, born 1962) =

Polish footballer

Personal information
- Full name: Jacek Robert Bąk
- Date of birth: 7 June 1962 (age 64)
- Place of birth: Roźwienica, Poland
- Height: 1.75 m (5 ft 9 in)
- Positions: Midfielder; forward

Youth career
- 1975–1980: JKS 1909 Jarosław

Senior career*
Years	Team	Apps	(Gls)
1980–1982	Resovia Rzeszów	42	(6)
1982–1985	Lech Poznań	84	(4)
1985–1988	Lechia Gdańsk	62	(3)
1988	Zawisza Bydgoszcz		
1988–1993	Legia Warsaw	103	(3)
1994	Casale F.B.C.		
1995–1996	Chatillon St. Vincent		
1996–1997	Crescentinese CC		
1997–1998	Olimpia Warsaw		
2001	Marymont Warsaw		
- * Club domestic league appearances and goals

Jacek Robert Bąk (born 7 June 1962) is a Polish former footballer who played as a midfielder and forward. He had success as a player with Lech Poznań and Legia Warsaw, and also had a notable spell with Lechia Gdańsk.

== Career ==
=== Early years ===
Born in the village of Roźwienica, Bąk started playing football in the nearby town of Jarosław playing for the JKS 1909 Jarosław youth team. In 1980, he joined the biggest team in the region, Resovia Rzeszów, appearing for the club 42 times over the next two seasons.

=== Lech Poznań ===
In 1982, he joined Lech Poznań, where he spent the next three seasons. He played a total of 84 league games scoring 4 goals. During his time with Lech, Bąk won the I liga in 1982–83 and 1983–84, and the Polish Cup in 1984.

=== Lechia Gdańsk ===
Bąk moved to Lechia Gdańsk in 1985. He made his debut against his former club Lech on 31 July 1985 in a 0–0 draw. He spent 3 seasons with Lechia, playing 62 times in the top division for Lechia. During his time at Lechia the team were often towards the lower end of the table. He left during the winter of the 1987–88 season when Lechia looked on the verge of relegation to the II liga. After Lechia, he spent six months with Zawisza Bydgoszcz.

=== Legia Warsaw ===
Bąk moved to Legia Warsaw in 1988, making his debut against Olimpia Poznań. His time with Legia was as successful as his time with Lech. During his 132 appearances for the club, Bąk helped Legia win the Polish Cup in 1988 and 1989, as well as the Polish Super Cup in 1988. His final appearance for Legia came in November 1992, with Bąk leaving Legia during the summer of 1993.

=== Later years ===
Bąk spent his later footballing years playing with Casale F.B.C., Chatillon St. Vincent and Crescentinese CC in Italy between 1994 and 1997. He returned to Poland in 1997 to play with Olimpia Warsaw until 1998. After 3 years away from the game he played with Marymont Warsaw in 2001.

== Honours ==
Lech Poznań

- Ekstraklasa: 1982–83, 1983–84
- Polish Cup: 1983–84

Legia Warsaw

- Polish Cup: 1988–89, 1989–90
- Polish Super Cup: 1988
