= Budzyń, Podkarpackie Voivodeship =

Budzyń
- Village
- Location within Poland
- Coordinates: 49°59′N 23°8′E
- Country: Poland
- Voivodeship: Subcarpathian
- County: Jarosław
- Gmina: Radymno

Budzyń [ˈbud͡zɨɲ] is a village in the administrative district of Gmina Radymno, within Jarosław County, Subcarpathian Voivodeship, in south-eastern Poland, close to the border with Ukraine.
