= Wietlin Trzeci =

- Village
- Location within Poland
- Coordinates: 50°0′9″N 22°52′0″E
- Country: Poland
- Voivodeship: Subcarpathian
- County: Jarosław
- Gmina: Laszki

Wietlin Trzeci [ˈvʲɛtlʲin ˈtʂɛt͡ɕi] is a village in the administrative district of Gmina Laszki, in Jarosław County, Subcarpathian Voivodeship, in south-eastern Poland.
