= Tyniowice =

- Village
- Location within Poland
- Coordinates: 49°56′N 22°34′E
- Country: Poland
- Voivodeship: Subcarpathian
- County: Jarosław
- Gmina: Roźwienica
- Population (approx.): 460

Tyniowice [tɨɲɔˈvʲit͡sɛ] is a village in the administrative district of Gmina Roźwienica, within Jarosław County, Subcarpathian Voivodeship, in south-eastern Poland.
