= Tapin, Podkarpackie Voivodeship =

Tapin
- Village
- Location within Poland
- Coordinates: 49°55′N 22°41′E
- Country: Poland
- Voivodeship: Subcarpathian
- County: Jarosław
- Gmina: Rokietnica

Tapin [ˈtapʲin] is a village in the administrative district of Gmina Rokietnica, within Jarosław County, Subcarpathian Voivodeship, in south-eastern Poland.
