= Pawłosiów =

- Village
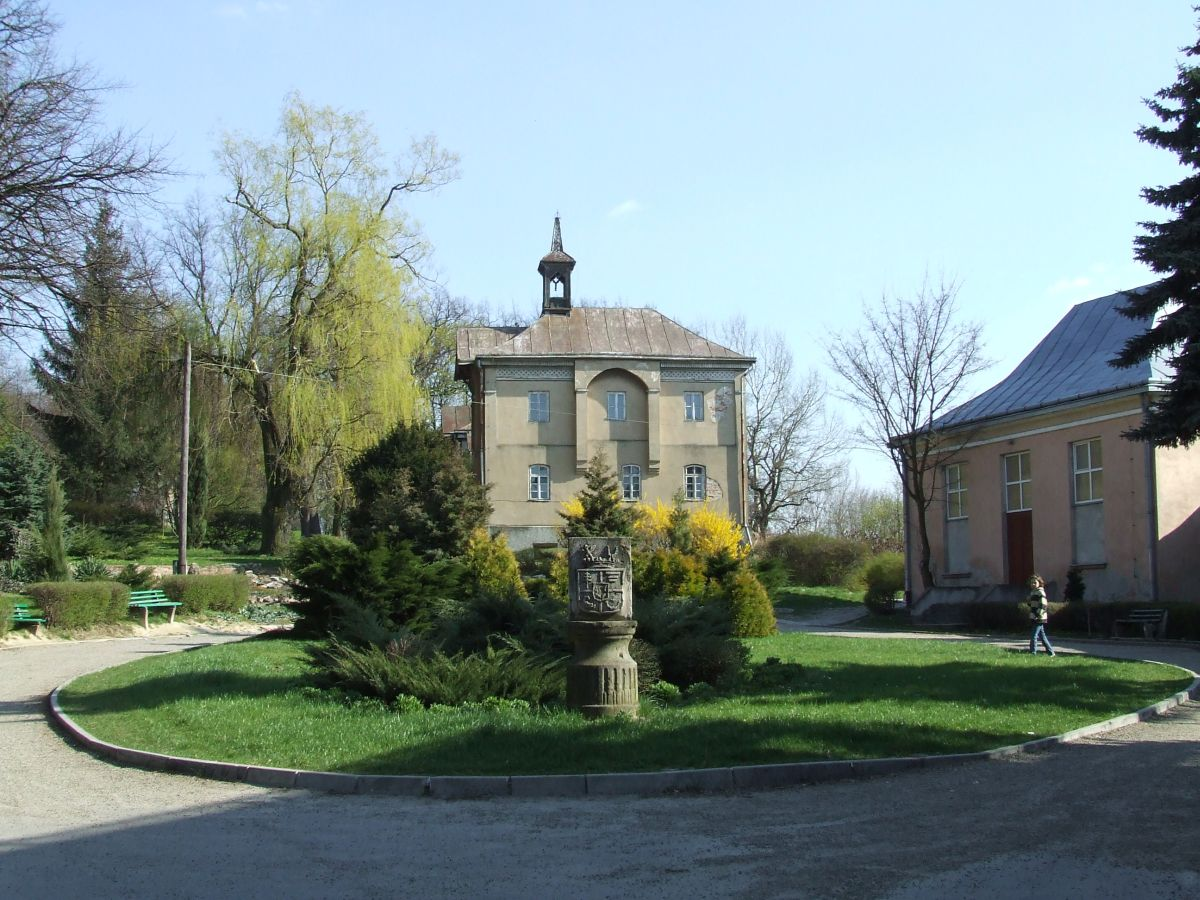
- Siemieński Palace

- Location within Poland
- Coordinates: 49°59′N 22°39′E
- Country: Poland
- Voivodeship: Subcarpathian
- County: Jarosław
- Gmina: Pawłosiów

Population
  - Total: 1,800

Pawłosiów [pavˈwɔɕuf] is a village in Jarosław County, Subcarpathian Voivodeship, in south-eastern Poland. It is the seat of the gmina (administrative district) called Gmina Pawłosiów.

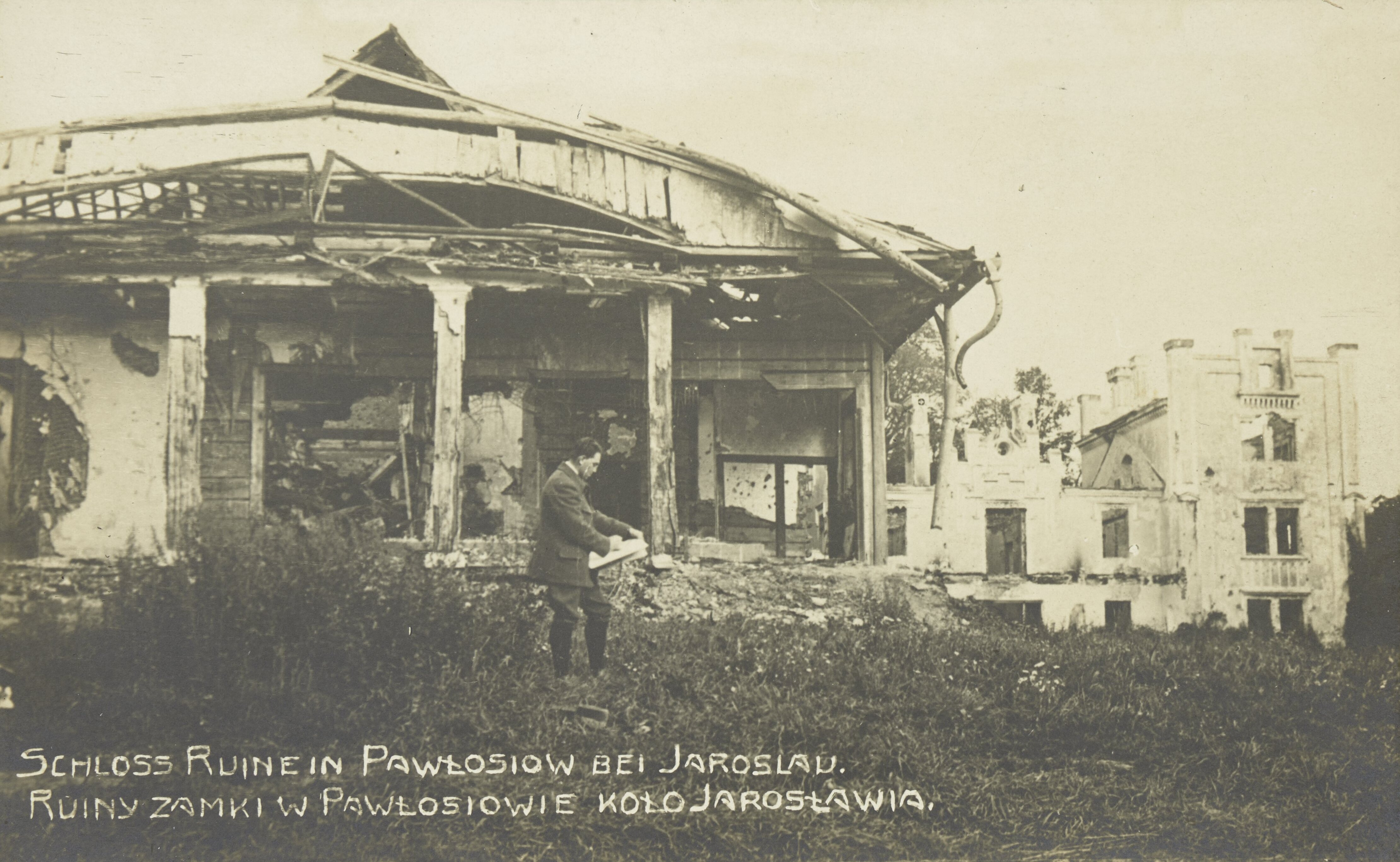
Ruins of the palace, around 1915
