= Gmina Chłopice =

Gmina Chłopice Chłopice Commune
- Gmina
- Location within Poland Location within Europe
- Coordinates (Chłopice): 49°58′N 22°41′E
- Country: Poland
- Voivodeship: Subcarpathian
- County: Jarosław
- Seat: Chłopice

Area
  - Total: 49.11 km^{2} (18.96 sq mi)

Population (2013)
  - Total: 5,609
  - Density: 114.2/km^{2} (295.8/sq mi)

Gmina Chłopice is a rural gmina (administrative district) in Jarosław County, Subcarpathian Voivodeship, in south-eastern Poland. Its seat is the village of Chłopice, which lies approximately 6 kilometres (4 mi) south of Jarosław and 50 km (31 mi) east of the regional capital Rzeszów.

The gmina covers an area of 49.11 square kilometres (19.0 sq mi), and as of 2013 its total population is 5,609.

== Villages ==
Gmina Chłopice contains the villages and settlements of Boratyn, Chłopice, Dobkowice, Jankowice, Łowce, Lutków and Zamiechów.

== Neighbouring gminas ==
Gmina Chłopice is bordered by the gminas of Jarosław, Orły, Pawłosiów, Radymno, Rokietnica and Roźwienica.
