= Gmina Roźwienica =

Gmina Roźwienica Roźwienica Commune
- Gmina
- Coat of arms
- Interactive map of Gmina Roźwienica
- Coordinates (Roźwienica): 49°57′9″N 22°35′28″E
- Country: Poland
- Voivodeship: Subcarpathian
- County: Jarosław
- Seat: Roźwienica

Area
  - Total: 70.69 km^{2} (27.29 sq mi)

Population (2013)
  - Total: 6,215
  - Density: 87.92/km^{2} (227.7/sq mi)
- Website: http://www.rozwienica.itl.pl

Gmina Roźwienica is a rural gmina (administrative district) in Jarosław County, Subcarpathian Voivodeship, in south-eastern Poland. Its seat is the village of Roźwienica, which lies approximately 10 kilometres (6 mi) south-west of Jarosław and 43 km (27 mi) east of the regional capital Rzeszów.

The gmina covers an area of 70.69 square kilometres (27.3 sq mi), and as of 2006 its total population is 6,395 (6,215 in 2013).

== Villages ==
Gmina Roźwienica contains the villages and settlements of Bystrowice, Chorzów, Cząstkowice, Czudowice, Roźwienica, Rudołowice, Tyniowice, Węgierka, Więckowice, Wola Roźwienicka and Wola Węgierska.

== Neighbouring gminas ==
Gmina Roźwienica is bordered by the gminas of Chłopice, Krzywcza, Pawłosiów, Pruchnik, Rokietnica and Zarzecze.
