= Więckowice, Podkarpackie Voivodeship =

Więckowice
- Village
- Location within Poland
- Coordinates: 49°55′2″N 22°34′47″E
- Country: Poland
- Voivodeship: Subcarpathian
- County: Jarosław
- Gmina: Roźwienica

Więckowice [vʲɛnt͡skɔˈvʲit͡sɛ] is a village in the administrative district of Gmina Roźwienica, within Jarosław County, Subcarpathian Voivodeship, in south-eastern Poland.
