= Gmina Pawłosiów =

Gmina Pawłosiów Pawłosiów Commune
- Gmina
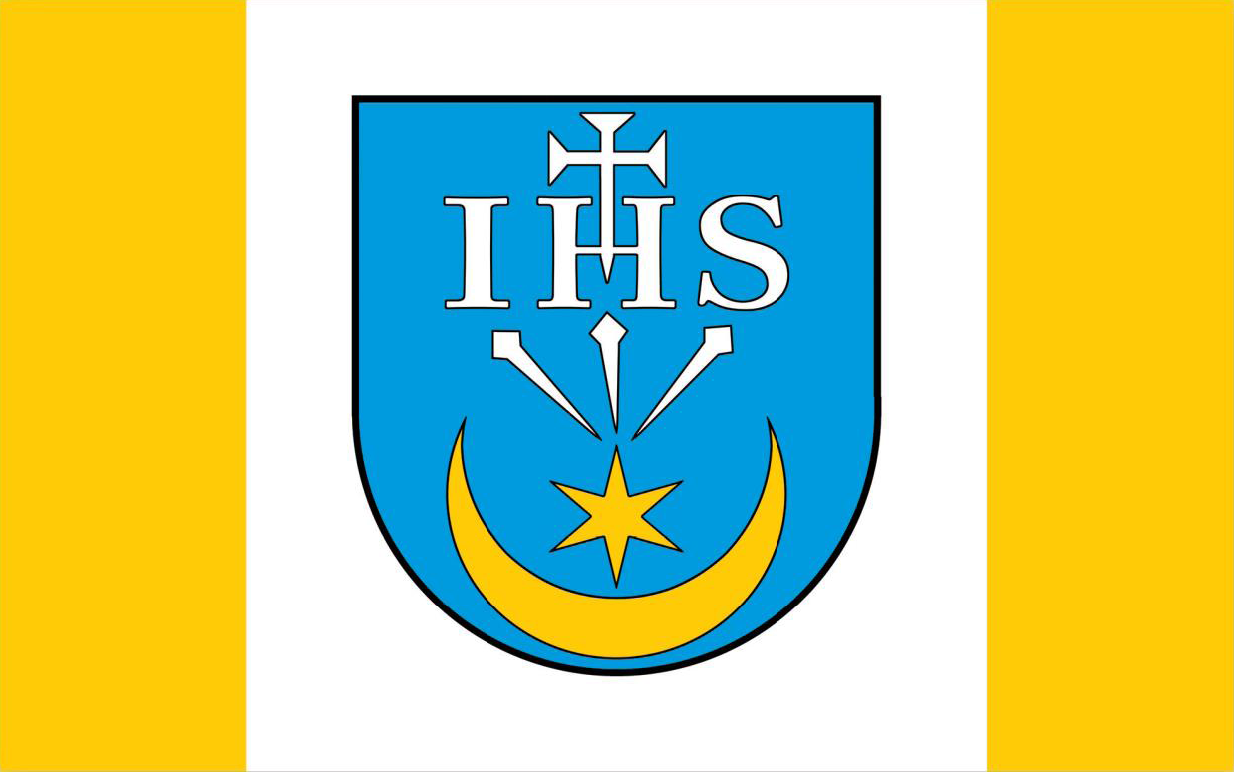
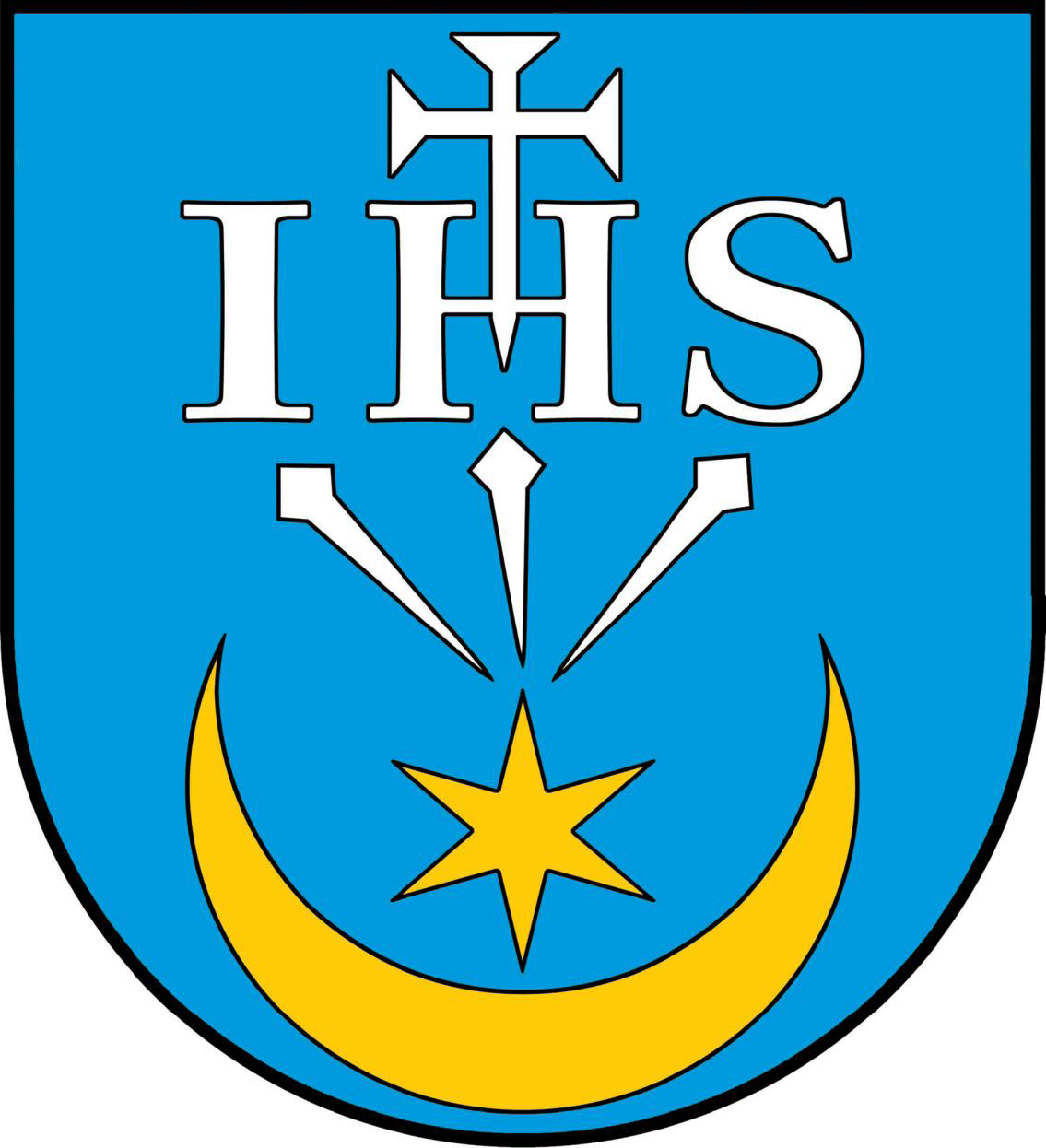
- Flag Coat of arms
- Interactive map of Gmina Pawłosiów
- Coordinates (Pawłosiów): 49°59′N 22°39′E
- Country: Poland
- Voivodeship: Subcarpathian
- County: Jarosław
- Seat: Pawłosiów

Area
  - Total: 47.49 km^{2} (18.34 sq mi)

Population (2013)
  - Total: 8,345
  - Density: 175.7/km^{2} (455.1/sq mi)
- Website: http://gminapawlosiow.webpark.pl

Gmina Pawłosiów is a rural gmina (administrative district) in Jarosław County, Subcarpathian Voivodeship, in south-eastern Poland. Its seat is the village of Pawłosiów, which lies approximately 5 kilometres (3 mi) south-west of Jarosław and 47 km (29 mi) east of the regional capital Rzeszów.

The gmina covers an area of 47.49 square kilometres (18.3 sq mi), and as of 2006 its total population is 8,190 (8,345 in 2013).

== Villages ==
Gmina Pawłosiów contains the villages and settlements of Cieszacin Mały, Cieszacin Wielki, Kidałowice, Maleniska, Ożańsk, Pawłosiów, Szczytna, Tywonia, Widna Góra and Wierzbna.

== Neighbouring gminas ==
Gmina Pawłosiów is bordered by the town of Jarosław and by the gminas of Chłopice, Jarosław, Przeworsk, Roźwienica and Zarzecze.
