= Gmina Wiązownica =

Gmina Wiązownica Wiązownica Commune
- Gmina
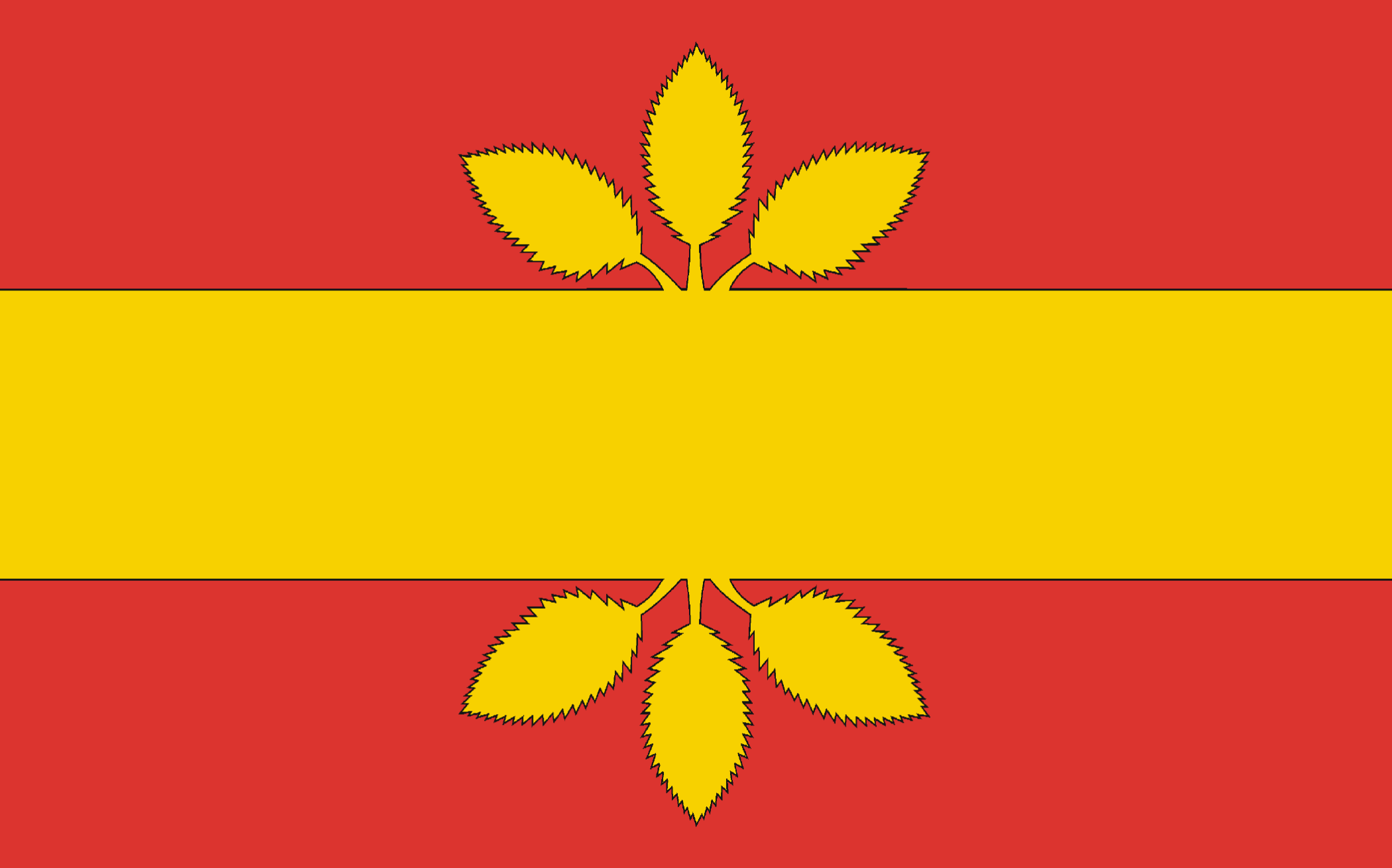
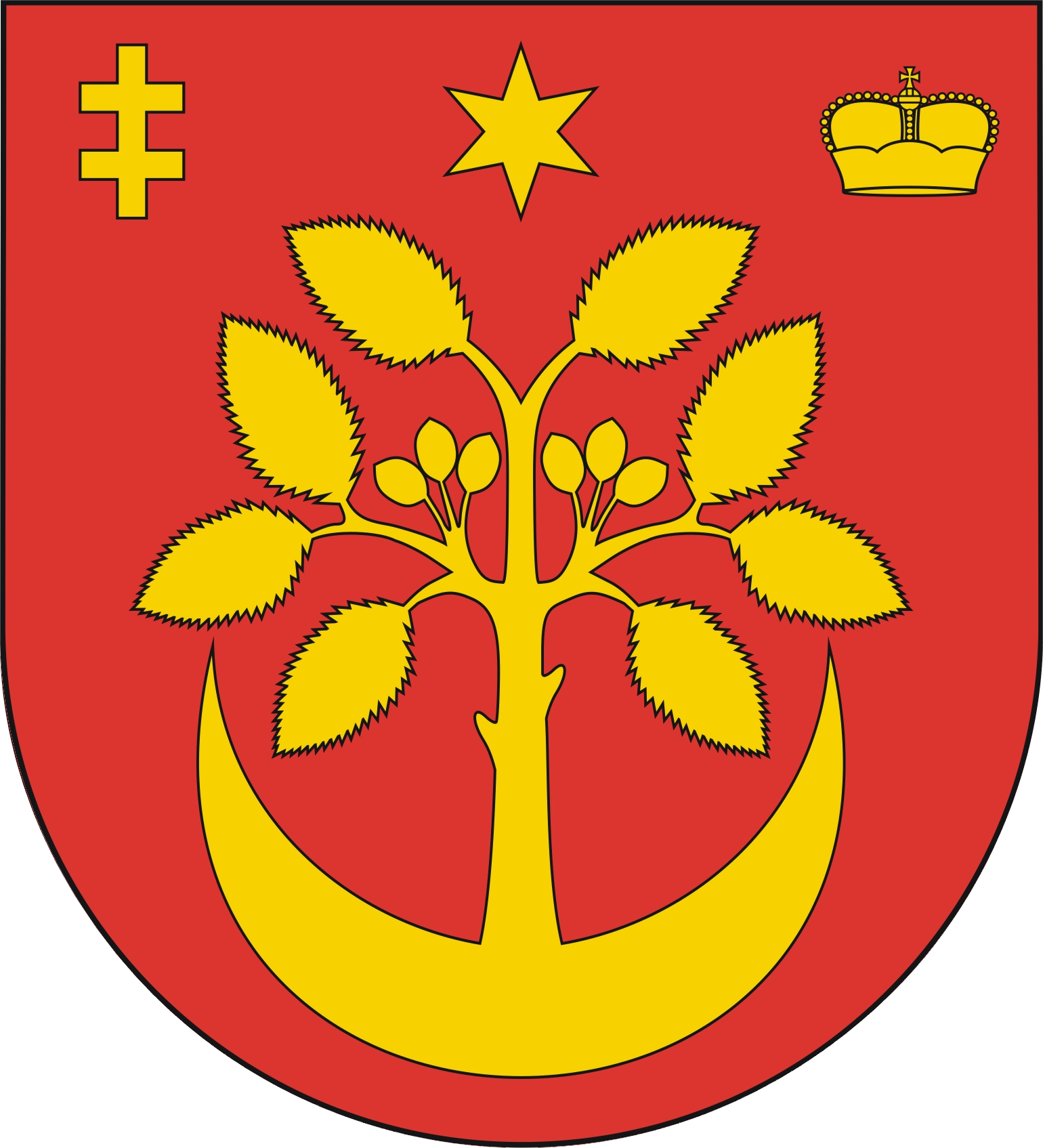
- Flag Coat of arms
- Interactive map of Gmina Wiązownica
- Coordinates (Wiązownica): 50°4′N 22°42′E
- Country: Poland
- Voivodeship: Subcarpathian
- County: Jarosław
- Seat: Wiązownica

Area
  - Total: 243.86 km^{2} (94.15 sq mi)

Population (2013)
  - Total: 11,552
  - Density: 47.371/km^{2} (122.69/sq mi)
- Website: https://web.archive.org/web/20070501151330/http://www.wiazownica.regiony.pl/

Gmina Wiązownica is a rural gmina (administrative district) in Jarosław County, Subcarpathian Voivodeship, in south-eastern Poland. Its seat is the village of Wiązownica, which lies approximately 6 kilometres (4 mi) north of Jarosław and 50 km (31 mi) east of the regional capital Rzeszów.

The gmina covers an area of 243.86 square kilometres (94.2 sq mi), and as of 2006 its total population is 11,037 (11,552 in 2013).

== Villages ==
Gmina Wiązownica contains the villages and settlements of Cetula, Manasterz, Mołodycz, Nielepkowice, Piwoda, Radawa, Ryszkowa Wola, Surmaczówka, Szówsko, Wiązownica, Wólka Zapałowska and Zapałów.

== Neighbouring gminas ==
Gmina Wiązownica is bordered by the town of Jarosław and by the gminas of Adamówka, Jarosław, Laszki, Oleszyce, Sieniawa and Stary Dzików.
