= Bobrówka, Podkarpackie Voivodeship =

Bobrówka
- Village
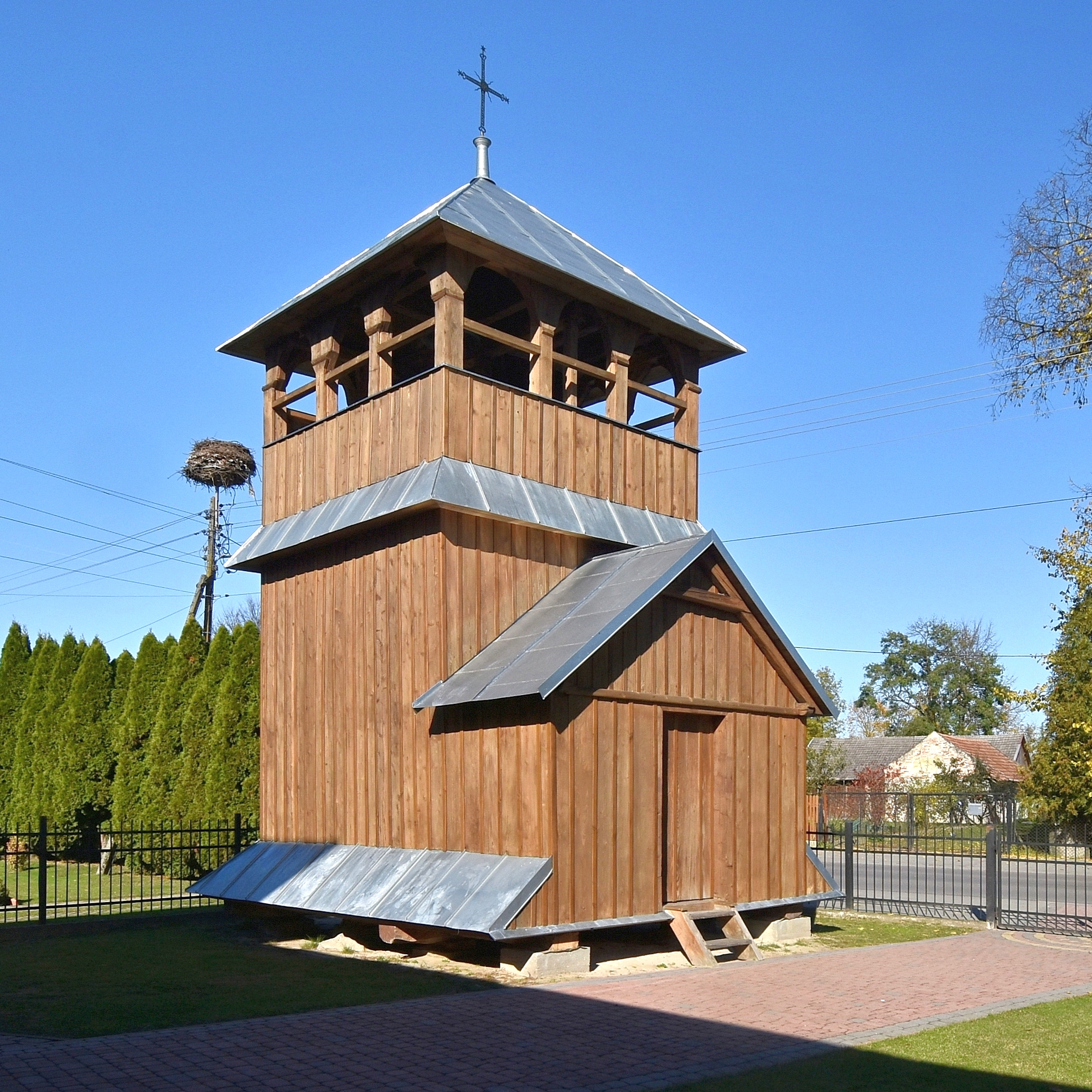

- Location within Poland
- Coordinates: 50°2′52″N 22°51′51″E
- Country: Poland
- Voivodeship: Subcarpathian
- County: Jarosław
- Gmina: Laszki

Bobrówka [bɔˈbrufka] is a village in the administrative district of Gmina Laszki, within Jarosław County, Subcarpathian Voivodeship, in south-eastern Poland.
