= Gmina Radymno =

Gmina Radymno Radymno Commune
- Gmina
- Coat of arms
- Interactive map of Gmina Radymno
- Coordinates (Radymno): 49°57′0″N 22°48′59″E
- Country: Poland
- Voivodeship: Subcarpathian
- County: Jarosław
- Seat: Radymno

Area
  - Total: 182.44 km^{2} (70.44 sq mi)

Population (2013)
  - Total: 11,431
  - Density: 62.656/km^{2} (162.28/sq mi)

Gmina Radymno is a rural gmina (administrative district) in Jarosław County, Subcarpathian Voivodeship, in south-eastern Poland, on the border with Ukraine. Its seat is the town of Radymno, although the town is not part of the territory of the gmina.

The gmina covers an area of 182.44 square kilometres (70.4 sq mi), and as of 2006 its total population is 11,292 (11,431 in 2013).

== Villages ==
Gmina Radymno contains the villages and settlements of Budzyń, Chałupki Chotynieckie, Chotyniec, Duńkowice, Grabowiec, Korczowa, Łazy, Michałówka, Młyny, Nienowice, Ostrów, Piaski, Skołoszów, Sośnica, Sośnica-Brzeg, Święte, Zabłotce, Zaleska Wola and Zamojsce.

== Neighbouring gminas ==
Gmina Radymno is bordered by the town of Radymno and by the gminas of Chłopice, Jarosław, Laszki, Orły, Stubno and Wielkie Oczy. It also borders Ukraine.
