= Gmina Laszki =

Gmina Laszki Laszki Commune
- Gmina
- Coat of arms
- Interactive map of Gmina Laszki
- Coordinates (Laszki): 50°1′15″N 22°53′58″E
- Country: Poland
- Voivodeship: Subcarpathian
- County: Jarosław
- Seat: Laszki

Area
  - Total: 137.85 km^{2} (53.22 sq mi)

Population (2013)
  - Total: 7,037
  - Density: 51.05/km^{2} (132.2/sq mi)
- Website: http://www.laszki.itl.pl

Gmina Laszki is a rural gmina (administrative district) in Jarosław County, Subcarpathian Voivodeship, in south-eastern Poland. Its seat is the village of Laszki, which lies approximately 16 kilometres (10 mi) east of Jarosław and 65 km (40 mi) east of the regional capital Rzeszów.

The gmina covers an area of 137.85 square kilometres (53.2 sq mi), and as of 2013 its total population is 7,037.

== Villages ==
Gmina Laszki contains the villages and settlements of Bobrówka, Bukowina, Charytany, Czerniawka, Korzenica, Laszki, Miękisz Nowy, Miękisz Stary, Tuchla, Tuchla-Osada, Wietlin, Wietlin Pierwszy, Wietlin Trzeci, Wietlin-Osada and Wysocko.

== Neighbouring gminas ==
Gmina Laszki is bordered by the gminas of Jarosław, Oleszyce, Radymno, Wiązownica and Wielkie Oczy.
