= Gmina Jarosław =

Gmina Jarosław Jarosław Commune
- Gmina
- Flag Coat of arms
- Interactive map of Gmina Jarosław
- Coordinates (Jarosław): 50°1′7″N 22°40′47″E
- Country: Poland
- Voivodeship: Subcarpathian
- County: Jarosław
- Seat: Jarosław

Area
  - Total: 114.05 km^{2} (44.03 sq mi)

Population (2013)
  - Total: 13,061
  - Density: 114.52/km^{2} (296.61/sq mi)
- Website: http://jaroslaw.itl.pl/

Gmina Jarosław is a rural gmina (administrative district) in Jarosław County, Subcarpathian Voivodeship, in south-eastern Poland. Its seat is the town of Jarosław, although the town is not part of the territory of the gmina.

The gmina covers an area of 114.05 square kilometres (44.0 sq mi), and as of 2013 its total population is 13,061.

== Villages ==
Gmina Jarosław contains the villages and settlements of Koniaczów, Kostków, Leżachów-Osada, Makowisko, Morawsko, Munina, Pełkinie, Sobiecin, Surochów, Tuczempy, Wola Buchowska, Wólka Pełkińska and Zgoda.

== Neighbouring gminas ==
Gmina Jarosław is bordered by the town of Jarosław and by the gminas of Chłopice, Laszki, Pawłosiów, Przeworsk, Radymno, Sieniawa, Tryńcza and Wiązownica.
