= Wiązownica, Podkarpackie Voivodeship =

Wiązownica
- Village
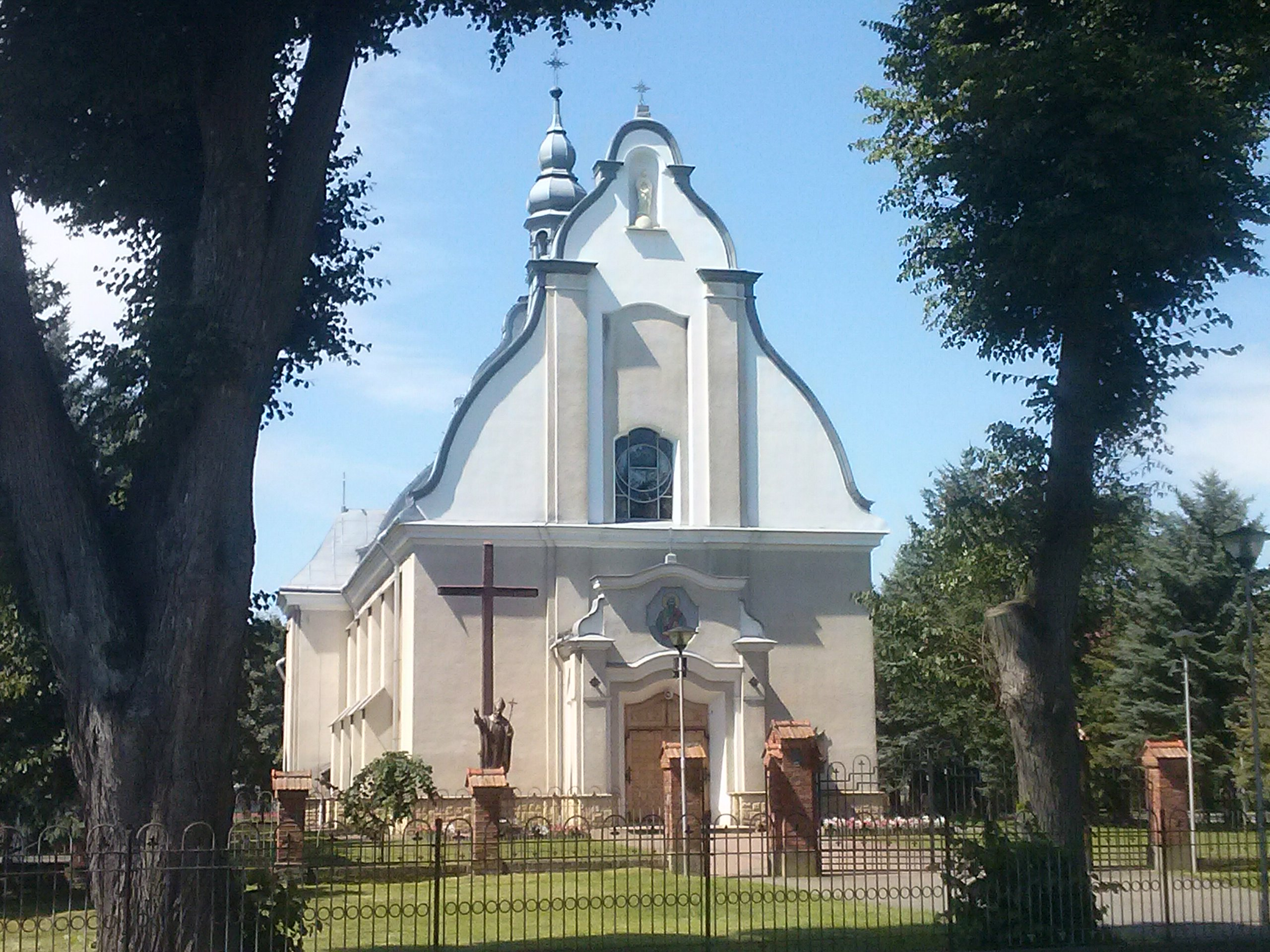
- Church of Saint Valentine and the Virgin Mary

- Location within Poland
- Coordinates: 50°4′N 22°42′E
- Country: Poland
- Voivodeship: Subcarpathian
- County: Jarosław
- Gmina: Wiązownica

Population
  - Total: 1,700

Wiązownica [vʲɔ̃zɔvˈɲit͡sa] is a village in Jarosław County, Subcarpathian Voivodeship, in south-eastern Poland. It is the seat of the gmina (administrative district) called Gmina Wiązownica.

The village was the site of the Wiązownica massacre in 1945 in which Ukrainian nationalists slaughtered around 100 Polish civilians.

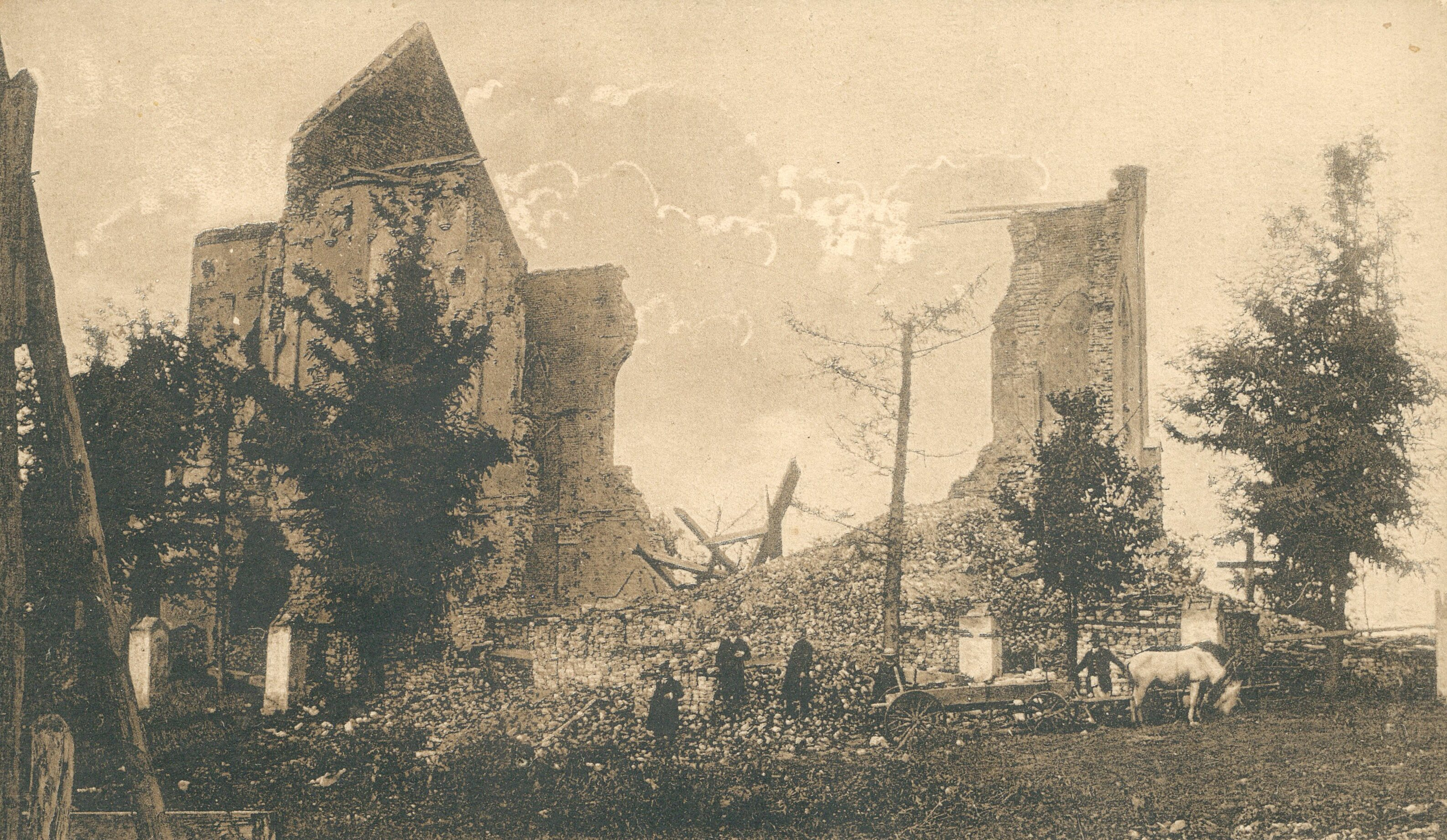
Destroyed church, around 1915
