= Gmina Rokietnica =

Gmina Rokietnica may refer to either of the following rural administrative districts in Poland:

- Gmina Rokietnica, Subcarpathian Voivodeship
- Gmina Rokietnica, Greater Poland Voivodeship
