= Chłopice =

- Village
- Location within Poland
- Coordinates: 49°58′N 22°41′E
- Country: Poland
- Voivodeship: Subcarpathian
- County: Jarosław
- Gmina: Chłopice

Chłopice [xwɔˈpʲit͡sɛ] is a village in Jarosław County, Subcarpathian Voivodeship, in south-eastern Poland. It is the seat of the gmina (administrative district) called Gmina Chłopice.
