= Rokietnica, Podkarpackie Voivodeship =

Rokietnica
- Village
- Location within Poland
- Coordinates: 49°54′3″N 22°38′22″E
- Country: Poland
- Voivodeship: Subcarpathian
- County: Jarosław
- Gmina: Rokietnica
- Population: 2,500
- Website: http://www.republika.pl/rokietnica_ug/

Rokietnica [rɔkʲɛtˈɲit͡sa] is a village in Jarosław County, Subcarpathian Voivodeship, in south-eastern Poland. It is the seat of the gmina (administrative district) called Gmina Rokietnica.
