= Roźwienica =

- Village
- Location within Poland
- Coordinates: 49°57′9″N 22°35′28″E
- Country: Poland
- Voivodeship: Subcarpathian
- County: Jarosław
- Gmina: Roźwienica
- Population: 720

Roźwienica [rɔʑvʲɛˈɲit͡sa] is a village in Jarosław County, Subcarpathian Voivodeship, in south-eastern Poland. It is the seat of the gmina (administrative district) called Gmina Roźwienica.
