= Gmina Rokietnica, Podkarpackie Voivodeship =

Gmina Rokietnica Rokietnica Commune
- Gmina
- Coat of arms
- Interactive map of Gmina Rokietnica
- Coordinates (Rokietnica): 49°54′3″N 22°38′22″E
- Country: Poland
- Voivodeship: Subcarpathian
- County: Jarosław
- Seat: Rokietnica

Area
  - Total: 57.35 km^{2} (22.14 sq mi)

Population (2013)
  - Total: 4,396
  - Density: 76.65/km^{2} (198.5/sq mi)
- Website: http://www.republika.pl/rokietnica_ug/

Gmina Rokietnica is a rural gmina (administrative district) in Jarosław County, Subcarpathian Voivodeship, in south-eastern Poland. Its seat is the village of Rokietnica, which lies approximately 14 kilometres (9 mi) south of Jarosław and 48 km (30 mi) east of the regional capital Rzeszów.

The gmina covers an area of 57.35 square kilometres (22.1 sq mi), and as of 2006 its total population is 4,420 (4,396 in 2013).

== Villages ==
Gmina Rokietnica contains the villages and settlements of Czelatyce, Rokietnica, Tapin, Tuligłowy and Wola Rokietnicka.

== Neighbouring gminas ==
Gmina Rokietnica is bordered by the gminas of Chłopice, Krzywcza, Roźwienica and Żurawica.
