= Jarosław County =

Jarosław County Powiat jarosławski
- County
- Flag Coat of arms

- Location within the voivodeship
- Coordinates (Jarosław): 50°1′7″N 22°40′47″E
- Country: Poland
- Voivodeship: Subcarpathian
- Seat: Jarosław
- Gminas: Total 11 (incl. 2 urban): Jarosław; Radymno; Gmina Chłopice; Gmina Jarosław; Gmina Laszki; Gmina Pawłosiów; Gmina Pruchnik; Gmina Radymno; Gmina Rokietnica; Gmina Roźwienica; Gmina Wiązownica

Area
  - Total: 1,029.15 km^{2} (397.36 sq mi)

Population (2019)
  - Total: 120,462
  - Density: 117.050/km^{2} (303.158/sq mi)
  - Urban: 46,628
  - Rural: 73,834
- Car plates: RJA
- Website: starostwo.jaroslaw.pl

Jarosław County (Polish: powiat jarosławski) is a unit of territorial administration and local government (powiat) in Subcarpathian Voivodeship, south-eastern Poland, on the border with Ukraine. It came into being on January 1, 1999, as a result of the Polish local government reforms passed in 1998. Its administrative seat and largest town is Jarosław, which lies 49 kilometres (30 mi) east of the regional capital Rzeszów. The only other towns in the county are Radymno, lying 13 km (8 mi) south-east of Jarosław, and Pruchnik (a town since 2011).

The county covers an area of 1,029.15 square kilometres (397.4 sq mi). As of 2019 its total population was 120,462, out of which the population of Jarosław was 37,585, that of Radymno was 5,279, that of Pruchnik was 3,764, and the rural population was 73,834.

== Neighbouring counties ==
Jarosław County is bordered by Przemyśl County to the south, Przeworsk County to the west and Lubaczów County to the east. It also borders Ukraine to the east.

== Administrative divisions ==
The county is subdivided into 11 gminas (two urban, one urban-rural and eight rural). These are listed in the following table, in descending order of population.

Gmina	Type	Area (km^{2})	Population (2019)	Seat
Jarosław	urban	34.5	37,585	
Gmina Jarosław	rural	114.1	13,201	Jarosław *
Gmina Wiązownica	rural	243.9	11,700	Wiązownica
Gmina Radymno	rural	182.4	11,451	Radymno *
Gmina Pruchnik	urban-rural	78.3	9,743	Pruchnik
Gmina Pawłosiów	rural	47.5	8,447	Pawłosiów
Gmina Laszki	rural	137.9	6,944	Laszki
Gmina Roźwienica	rural	70.7	6,238	Roźwienica
Gmina Chłopice	rural	49.1	5,521	Chłopice
Radymno	urban	13.6	5,279	
Gmina Rokietnica	rural	57.4	4,353	Rokietnica
* seat not part of the gmina
