= Ostrów, Przeworsk County =

Ostrów
- Village
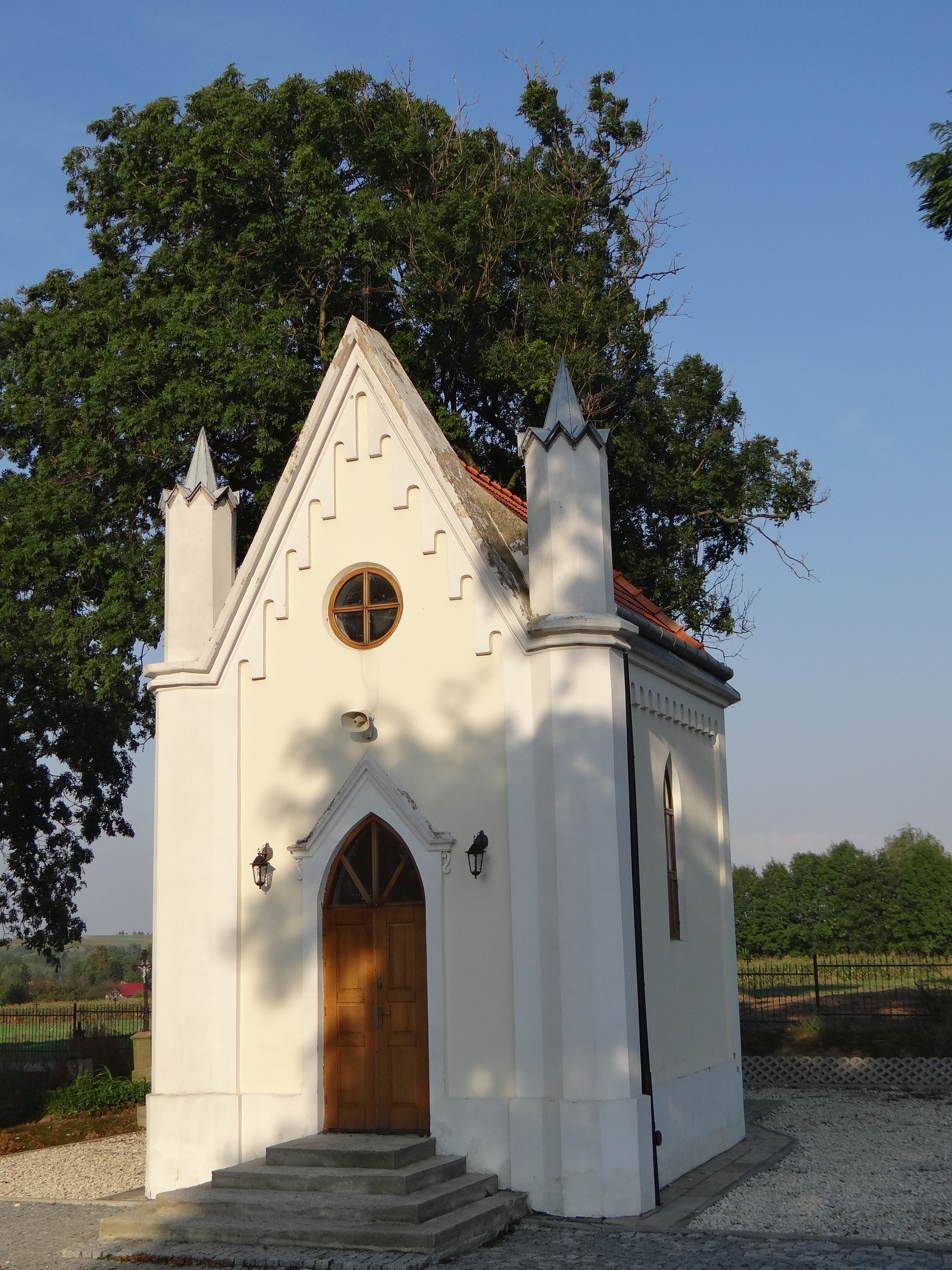
- Old chapel

- Location within Poland
- Coordinates: 50°1′4″N 22°24′6″E
- Country: Poland
- Voivodeship: Subcarpathian
- County: Przeworsk
- Gmina: Gać
- Population: 373
- Time zone: UTC+1 (CET)
  - Summer (DST): UTC+2 (CEST)
- Postal code: 37-207
- Vehicle registration: RPZ

Ostrów [ˈɔstruf] is a village in the administrative district of Gmina Gać, within Przeworsk County, Subcarpathian Voivodeship, in south-eastern Poland.

A prominent feature of Ostrów is the Roman Catholic parish of St. Fabiana and St. Sebastian which was founded in 1601.

== History ==
The village is situated on a frontal moraine headland, which cuts with its high banks into the Markówka valley as flat as a table (Mleczka tributary) . The name "ostrów" is an old term for an island on a river or swamps.

The first mention of the village comes from 1375, when Otto of Pilcza of the Topór coat of arms, gave the knight Wierzbieńcie the village of Mikulicze (now Mikulice), which also mentioned neighboring villages such as Nizaczyce (Niżatyce), and Sethescha (Sietesz).

Later these properties were inherited by Elżbieta Granowska née Pilecki (1372–1420). She was the only child of the Sandomierz voivode heir Sietesza Otto from Pilcza and Jadwiga Melsztyńska (daughter of Jan, godmother of Jagiełło, sister of Spytka ). When Elzbieta's father died in 1384, she inherited the huge properties of Łańcut, Ostrów and Pilica, becoming the richest virgin in Poland. During a 13-year marriage with Elżbieta gave birth to two sons and three daughters to Wincenty Granowski . She organized the parish here before 1391. On 12 December 1410 Elżbieta became a widow and married King Władysław II Jagiełło in Sanok on 2 May 1417, and thus Ostrów became a royal town. Until 1772 the town was administratively located in the Ruthenian Voivodeship in the Lesser Poland Province of the Kingdom of Poland.

In 1583, Ostrów belonged to the Jaroslawski family and paid tax from 16 ¼ of the canon's land and from two water mills . In addition to peasants the village was inhabited by 12 farmsteads with their houses on the land of a master or village administrator, they paid higher rent for the land used, 6 hired farms settled in communal land, 4 bailiffs with cattle, 20 "bare" mercenary bailiffs, 4 households and 1 expert on water mills.

=== Korniakt Period ===
In 1589 Konstanty Korniakt (1520-1603) purchased the village making it part of the Białoboki key. This included: 8 columns of soldiers, 3 farms settled on the land of a master or village administrator, 5 mercenary farms, 6 bailiffs with cattle, 7 mercenary bailiffs, 3 water mills, and 8 serf fields. In 1601 the parish in Ostrów was founded by Konstanty Korniakt.

When Konstanty Korniakt (the elder) died in 1603 his estates passed to his son, Konstanty Korniakt of Białobok (1582-1624). He sold his father's holdings in Lviv including Korniakt Palace, consolidating his holdings and building fortified brick castles at nearby Białoboki and at Sośnica.

In the summer of 1624 a Nogais Tatar horde led by Khan Temir destroyed the Ostrów church, Białoboki villages and overran Korniaktów Castle. The Tatars were stationed in a ravine in nearby Wolica - in ramparts and arranged there a weapons warehouse called zwolicą. The Tatar commander had his base In the neighboring village of Urzejowice from where he made trips to neighboring villages including Korniaktów castle.

Most of the surrounding villages including Gać, Markowa, Ostrów, Sietesz and Grzęska, were burned. During the battle of the church in Nowosielce a Tatar chief was wounded, whose ordinaries brought him to Białobok fields, where he died. At the place of his death a mound was built - a grave that still stands today, reminding of the tragic events of 1624.

The majority of villagers were captured and taken as Jasyr for sale to the Ottoman Empire where a terrible fate awaited. However the Polish forces attacked and defeated the Tatars at the Battle of Martynów 20 June 1624.

Konstanty Korniakt (son) died of his wounds sustained in the attack in 1624 at the age of 40. His estate passed to his wife Elżbieta Ossolińska, and from her to his son Karol Franciszek Korniakt. Konstanty was also survived by his daughter Anna Ossolińska and his brother Aleksander Korniakt.

In 1627 the church at Ostrów was rebuilt and a bell was added in 1645 that remains in the tower of the present church.

Ostrów was mentioned in the 1628 conscript registers together with Niedzwiadza (now Wolica). These villages had 13 fiefs and belonged to the Białoboki key, whose owner was from 1624 the widow of Konstantyn Korniact. In 1651 and 1658 the village was mentioned as Ostrow et Niedzwiedza.

From 1637 the Białobok key was owned by Karol Franciszek Korniakt. In 1651 peasant farms in Ostrów and neighboring Wolica occupied an area of 8 fiefs. In 1674, the village was mentioned together with Mikulice.

=== Lubomirski - Sanguszko Period ===
Around the middle of the 17th century the Korniakt male line expired and their castle at Białoboki fell into ruin. The villages of the former Białoboki key including Ostrów became property of Aleksander Dominik Lubomirski (1693-1720) who died childless. The estates passed his sister Marianna Lubomirska (1693-1729) who also owned Markowa, Mikulice, Ostrów and Wolica.

Paweł Karol Sanguszka (1680-1750) married Marianna, acquiring the Lubomirski estates. After Pawel's death the estates passed to their eldest son Janusz Aleksander Sanguszko who controversially divided of the Ostrogska estates in 1756.

The Kańczuga key remained in the Lubomirski family of Przeworsk until 1793, when it was purchased by Karol Szydłowiecki, who through the sale of individual villages led to the disintegration of the Kańczuga key.

=== Terlecki Period ===
After 1793 the estate became the hereditary property of Adam Terlecki who was also the heir of Ożańska. Adam Terlecki died in 1804.

Adam Terlecki's widow, Teresa, died in 1818 and her son Jan Terlecki became the heir of the estate. After his death in 1831 the estate was re-acquired by the Lubomirski family of Przeworsk.

=== End of the Feudal System ===
The peasant uprising and associated Galician slaughter of 1846 was centered at Tarnów and is credited with the demise of serfdom. Widespread destruction of crops during the hostilities was one of the reasons for the ensuing famine. After the abolition of serfdom and the enfranchisement of the villages in 1848, the only remaining noble hereditary property was the farm estate.

In 1882 Białoboki was recorded as part of Łańcut County, had 1083 rozl., 81 homes, 481 residents, a parish church in Urzejowice, and a municipal clearing office. The court area was owned by the Lubomirskis' Przeworsk estate. The farm estate was finally sold as plots in 1937 and so ended the last relics of the feudal system.

=== World Wars and Communist Period ===
The end of World War I (1914-1918) led to the Second Polish Republic (1918-1939).

Following the German-Soviet invasion of Poland, which started World War II in September 1939, the village was occupied by Germany. The Soviet army of the 1st Ukrainian Front arrived in nearby Kańczuga on 27 July 1944. The Soviets signed a Polish–Soviet border agreement in August 1945, internationally recognizing the Polish Provisional Government of National Unity on 16 August 1945.

The Polish People's Republic (1947-1989) placed the country under a communist government imposed by the Soviet Union. The Revolutions of 1989 led to the end to communist rule and establishment of the present-day Republic of Poland.

From 1945 to 1975 the town administratively belonged to the Rzeszów Voivodeship. In 1975–1998 the town administratively belonged to the Przemyśl Voivodeship.

== Church ==
The parish of Fabiana and St. Sebastian in Ostrów was erected on 26 January 1601 by Bishop Wawrzyniec Goślicki. Initially, it included two villages, Ostrów and Mikulice, excluded from the home parish of Gać. The parish was endowed with Konstanty Korniakta, and it included Ostrów and Mikulice.

The first wooden church was built by the inhabitants of Ostrów. That wooden church was burned down by the Tatars in 1624.

A new church was built in 1627 which was consecrated in 1708. The church bell from 1645 remains in the tower of the present temple. In the nineteenth century Białoboki joined the parish.

In 1938-1940 a stone church was built, which was consecrated in 1940. On 27 October 2002 the church was consecrated by Archbishop Józef Michalik.

On the old part of the cemetery there is a neo-Gothic 19th-century grave chapel.

== Monuments ==
- Historic cemetery in Ostrów - an object entered in the register of immovable monuments of the Podkarpackie Voivodeship

=== Other ===
- A church from the 1930s, baroque altars and a baptismal font, a bell on the tower from 1645.
