= Białoboki, Podkarpackie Voivodeship =

Białoboki
- Village
- Location within Poland
- Coordinates: 50°4′N 22°39′E
- Country: Poland
- Voivodeship: Subcarpathian
- County: Przeworsk
- Gmina: Gać
- Population: 709

Białoboki [bʲawɔˈbɔkʲi] is a village in the administrative district of Gmina Gać, within Przeworsk County, Subcarpathian Voivodeship, in south-eastern Poland.

The location is in a narrow valley north of the main valley of the Markówka river with the communal pastures at the bottom of an old lake or drained swamp. At the other end of this basin, from the south-east, on the steep bank lies the village of Ostrów, which in Proto-Slavic language indicates a place located on a swamp island or a peninsula entering the lake.

== History ==
The first traces of settlement in Przeworsk County were from the Stone Age (4000-1800 BC) and have been confirmed by objects of flint and stone. There are also traces from the Bronze Age (1700-650 BC). Cemeteries of Lusatian culture dating from 1000 to 650 BC were found at Białoboki and Grzęska at the site of the former settlement called Borek. An Iron Age archaeological complex and burial grounds have been assigned the name Przeworsk culture.

An ethnic group of Germans named Walddeutsche settled in the Subcarpathian Voivodeship from the 14th to 16th centuries, mostly after the region returned to the Polish sphere of influence in 1340 when Casimir III of Poland took the Czerwień towns.

The first written reference to Białoboki (Byelaboki) was in 1424. During the times of the Rzeczpospolita Szlachecka – the Republic of the Nobility – the district of Przeworsk was part of the Region of Przemyśl, which in turn constituted part of the Voivodeship of Ruthenia. The village was first mentioned in the Przeworsk Land Register in 1439 when it was the property of Ruthenian nobility. It is likely that it already existed before the incorporation of Red Ruthenia into Poland.

The local legend is that the name "Białoboki" derives from the white walls of Korniaktów castle. However earlier records from the time of the Byreczski family indicate some kind of "white" fortalice in the village before the castle was built.

An entry from 1445 mentions the owner Sieńka from Urzejowice, who handed over Białoboki to his son Jan Barzo. In 1454, another son of Sieńka, Ramsz from Białobok, is mentioned as the heir. Alternatively Jan Barzy had written "from Błozewo". In 1454, brothers Jan Barzy, Ramsz (Rampsz) and Aleksander inherited from their deceased uncle Jan Derszniak from Rokietnica, the Przemyśl commander. In 1460 Jakub Bierecki from Bircza became a co-owner of Białobok. In 1483, Ramsz exchanged his part of the village for a mill and a pond with Mikołaj village administrator from Albigowa. From 1487, this part was held by Stanisław and then Ota Pilecki, owners of Łańcut. Jakub Bierecki sold his part to Jan Pilecki in 1496. The son of Jan Mikołaj, the owner of Kańczuga, in 1498 gave it to his servant Piotr Pruszynowski. Pruszynowski was mentioned as heir in 1504.

In 1498 Przeworsk and its vicinity were plundered by Stefan, Voivode of Wallachia. It was then that many settlements in the region were encircled by impervious ramparts with round towers and gates.

According to the recruitment register from 1515, the village was written as Byaloboky and was subject to taxation of six serf-fields, a tavern and a pop (Polish for priest of a Rus Orthodox church).

Sometime before 1520, Wojciech Starzechowski, Castellan and Voivode of Belz became the owner. His holdings were inherited by his son Jan Starzechowski (died 1567), Lviv sub-chamber and voivode of Podolia. After his death, Białoboki and the son Stanisław took ownership of the key. After the death of Stanisław Starzechowski in 1582, his holdings were inherited by his wife Anna from Tarłów Starzechowska and children: Jan, Zofia, Dorota and Katarzyna. Jan Tarło became the legal guardian, voivode of Lublin, father of Anna.

From 1575 the leaseholder of the Białobok key was Mikołaj Sienieński of the Sanok sub-chamber. According to agreements of that time there was already a defensive fortification in Białoboki.

The gentry village was located here in 1589 in Przemyśl which at that time was land of the Ruthenian province.

=== Korniakt Period ===
Before 1589, the entire Białobok key: Białoboki, Ostrów, Wolica, part of Dębów, Mikulice, Rogóżno and Tarnawka were purchased by the Greek Konstanty Korniakt of Crete for the sum of PLN 100,000. The Starzechowscy family was seriously indebted to him and he had already rented these goods. The Korniakts, through their extraordinary entrepreneurship made a fortune and obtained a noble title.

Konstanty Korniakt's son, also named Konstanty Korniakt referred to himself as "Konstanty Korniakt of Białobocki". It was he who built a brick castle in Białoboki, which was located at the edge of the village. Besides this castle at Białoboki the Korniakt family also had a more defensive castle at their estates at Sośnica, and a large Renaissance tenement at the Lviv market square known as Korniakt Palace. Konstanty Korniakt paid a consumption tax on 4 1/2 peasant farm land areas.

==== Korniaktów Castle ====
From at least 1575 there was already a defensive fortification in Białoboki. .

Konstanty Korniakt (son) and his mother sold their extensive Lviv holdings and moved to the family's Przemyśl lands including their three residences: Białobok, Złotowice and Sośnica. They maintained the latter as the best fortified fortress and placed all their most valuable valuables and gems there, as well as cash reserves. Sośnica was also the property security of the Korniakt's mother, Anna Korniakt née, Dzieduszycka, who also kept her property there.

Białoboki became the headquarters of Konstanty Korniakt of Białobok (1582-1624) who was son of Konstanty Korniakt (1520-1603) of Kandia, Crete, Greece. The Korniakt family were one of the wealthiest of the Ruthenian province. In the middle of the village valley from the west is a quite large hill, on which they built the Korniakt family stronghold known as Korniaktów castle.

The stronghold at Białoboki was expanded to a brick castle in 1610. It was in an extremely defensive place surrounded by swamps from the west and south, and moat to the north and east with a drawbridge. The castle may not have been a great residence, but it had rich interiors with decorative white marble floors.

Around the middle of the 17th century the Korniaktów male line expired. After their death, the castle fell into final ruin.

Today small remains of the castle walls can still be found on the hill. There hasn't been archaeological research conducted and it is undetermined whether this hill is a natural hill or artificially built on otherwise flat terrain.

==== Dispute between Stadnicki and Korniakt ====
When Konstanty Korniakt (father) died in 1603 Konstanty Korniakt (son) inherited a fortune from his father, but also a lot of ill will.

In particular Stanisław "Diabeł" Stadnicki, the "Devil of Łańcut", owed Korniakt an enormous sum. Rather than repay Stadnicki decided to legally challenge the nobility of the Korniakt family; only nobility can own land. However, Korniakt (father) had legally received his nobility and the Korwin coat of arms from Poland's King Sigismund Augustus. Konstanty Korniakt (son) went on to win four great legal trials against Stadnicki:

1. the first for the sum of 40,000 zlotys that was still owed from his father from the Łańcut estate,
2. the second for 30,000 zlotys for the forests in Albigów and Wysoka,
3. the third for 100,000 zlotys for the income from rapidly taken away lands and Stadnicki's lawless invasion of Korniakt's property at nearby Sośnica,
4. he fourth for 42,000 zlotys for jewels and valuables looted during this invasion.

The total amount of claims was PLN 212,000, huge for those times. If Stadnicki had repaid it, he would have gone bankrupt. The court reduced it by half, and Korniakt also wanted to further reduce it in to encourage a voluntary settlement.

However Stadnicki attacked and the legend says that after a long fight Stadnicki took the castle, but Korniakt managed to escape through the tunnel leading from the castle to the village of Gać. There, a peasant helped him and in disguise he took him to a safe castle in Chodakówka. Stadnicki eventually captured Korniakta, whom he took to Łańcut and placed in the dungeons of his castle. Konstanty spent six months in the dungeons of Łańcut, until he and his mother and brother signed a commitment to waive all property claims and other wrongs against him.

After his release, Korniakt canceled his waivers and went into hiding at Lviv. Stadnicki, accompanied by 1,000 soldiers marched to Lviv and again forced Korniakta to renounce all claims. These events changed Konstanty Korniakt, formerly an exemplary citizen. After the death of his enemy Stadnicki in 1610 Korniakt became much more adventurous.

==== Tatar Attack ====
In the summer of 1624 a Nogais Tatar horde led by Khan Temir destroyed Białoboki and overran Korniaktów Castle. The Tatars were stationed in a ravine in nearby Wolica - in ramparts and arranged there a weapons warehouse called zwica. The Tatar commander had his base In the neighboring village of Urzejowice from where he made trips to neighboring villages including Korniaktów castle. Konstanty Korniakt (son) died of his wounds sustained in the attack in 1624 at the age of 40, survived by his two sons, Karol and Aleksander.

Most of the surrounding villages including Gać, Markowa, Ostrów, Sietesz and Grzęska, were burned. During the battle of the church in Nowosielce a Tatar chief was wounded, whose ordinaries brought him to Białobok fields, where he died. At the place of his death a mound was built - a grave that still stands today, reminding of the tragic events of 1624.

The majority of villagers were captured and taken as Jasyr for sale to the Ottoman Empire where a terrible fate awaited. However the Polish forces attacked and defeated the Tatars at the Battle of Martynów 20 June 1624.

Another interesting figure connected with the village was nobleman Jan Białobocki, born about 1600, died after 1661. He was a poet and historian. He served with Stanisław Lubomirski, fought at the battle of Chochim in 1621, and later with the Cossacks. He was the secretary of King Władysław IV and Jan Kazimierz. the siege of Zbarazai and the breaking of Skrzetuski from the besieged city to King Jan Kazimierz. Inspired by this story H. Sienkiewicz subsequently wrote "With Fire and Sword", the story of the Cossack Khmelnytsky Uprising.

The village was mentioned in the recruitment registers from 1628, 1651, 1658. In 1674 the village had 91 houses (including 47 in the farm).

In 1713 there were 12 farms in the village. The village gave 12 dragoons for the court service.

=== Lubomirski Period ===
In 1739, after the extinction of the Korniakt family, the village was owned by Marianna Bratkowska (née Lubomirska). She was also the owner of Markowa, Mikulice, Ostrów and Wolica. Marianna became the wife of who was the wife of Paweł Karol Sanguszka.

The Kańczuga key remained in the Lubomirski family until 1793, when it was purchased by Karol Szydłowiecki, who through the sale of individual villages led to the disintegration of the Kańczuga key.

=== Terlecki Period ===
After 1793 the estate became the hereditary property of Adam Terlecki who was also the heir of Ożańska. Adam Terlecki died in 1804.

Adam Terlecki's widow, Teresa, died in 1818 and her son Jan Terlecki became the heir of the estate. After his death in 1831 the estate was re-acquired by the Lubomirski family of Przeworsk.

=== End of the Feudal System ===
The peasant uprising and associated Galician slaughter of 1846 was centered at Tarnów and is credited with the demise of serfdom. Widespread destruction of crops during the hostilities was one of the reasons for the ensuing famine. After the abolition of serfdom and the enfranchisement of the villages in 1848, the only remaining noble hereditary property was the farm estate.

In 1882 Białoboki was recorded as part of Łańcut county, had 1083 rozl., 81 homes, 481 residents, a parish church in Urzejowice, and a municipal clearing office. The court area was owned by the Lubomirskis' Pzeworsk estate. The farm estate was finally sold as plots in 1937 and so ended the last relics of the feudal system.

=== World Wars and Communist Period ===
The end of World War I (1914-1918) led to the Second Polish Republic (1918-1939) until the Nazi Invasion of Poland and occupation (1939-1945).

The Soviet Invasion of Poland of 1939 eventually pushed the Germans out of Poland. The Soviet army of the 1st Ukrainian Front arrived in nearby Kańczuga July 27, 1944. The Soviets signed a Polish–Soviet border agreement.in August 1945, internationally recognizing the Polish Provisional Government of National Unity on 16 August 1945.

The Polish People's Republic (1947-1989) placed the country under a communist government imposed by the Soviet Union. The Revolutions of 1989 led to the end to communist rule and establishment of the present-day Republic of Poland.

From 1945 to 1975 the town administratively belonged to the Rzeszów voivodship.

In 1975–1998 the town administratively belonged to the Przemyśl voivodship.

== See also ==
- Walddeutsche

== Bibliography ==
- Wladyslaw Lozinski: Law and Lewem, Volumes I and II, Sparks, Warsaw 2005, ISBN 83-207-1769-8 Portal polskawliczbach.pl
- Franciszek Młynek and Józef Benbenek: Przeworsk i Okolice, Warsaw 1960
- Wincenty Styś: Roads of rural economic progress
- Zygmunt Gloger: Encyclopedia Staropolska, 1989, ISBN 83-214-0411-1 Portal polskawliczbach.pl
- Jerzy Antoni Kostka, "Kostków of the Dąbrowa coat of arms" ed. POLYMER ZP, Koszalin, 2010 ISBN 978-83-89976-40-6, pp. 480
- "Knights and Rabbits", 1984
