= Konstanty Korniakt of Białobok =

Polish nobleman and soldier (1581–1624)

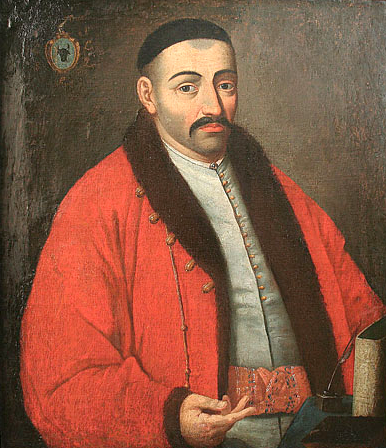
- Portrait Konstanty Korniakt of Białobok
- Coat of arms: Krucina
- Born: 1582
- Died: 1624 (aged 41–42); Białobok
- Buried: Przemyśl
- Noble family: Korniakt
- Spouse: Elżbieta Ossolińska
- Issue: Anna, Karol Franciszek, Aleksander Zbigniew
- Father: Konstanty Korniakt
- Mother: Anna Dzieduszycki

Konstanty Korniakt of Białobok or Konstantyn Franciszek Korniakt (1582-1624) was a Polish nobleman and soldier, the son of the noble Polish merchant Konstanty Korniakt (1520-1603) of Crete.

== Biography ==
=== Early life ===
Konstantyn Franciszek Korniakt was born in Sośnica in 1582, the son of the noble Polish merchant Konstanty Korniakt (the elder, b. 1520, h. Krucina) and Ruthenian noblewoman Anna Dzieduszycki h. Sas.

Konstanty Korniakt (the elder) had moved to Lviv in 1554, inheriting the property of his elder brother Michael Kornakt. By 1566 the Polish king Sigismund II Augustus had granted him the privilege to import and sell Greek wines, cotton, Moldavian honey, cowhides and furs, and Western cloths. On 12 February 1571 the king ennobled Konstanty Korniakt (the elder) granting him the Krucina coat of arms. by which time he was the wealthiest inhabitant of Lviv, and one of the greatest patrons of Lviv Renaissance architecture.

Konstantyn Franciszek had five siblings: Aleksander, Michal, Anna (m. Jan Tarnowski), Zofia (m. Abraham Herburt), and Katarzyna (m. Aleksander Chodkiewicz). Konstanty (the elder) was a ardent follower of the Eastern Orthodox Church but had good relations with the Jesuits. However the children became polonized, converted to Catholicism, and the sons studied at the University of Padua in Italy.

By the time of his death Konstanty (the elder) had accumulated about 40 villages, 2 towns, and crown lands including estates in Lwów Land and Przemyśl Land.

=== Establishment at Bialoboki ===
After his father's death on 1 August 1603, Korniakt sold his inherited Lwów Land estates, including some left to his brother Aleksander. Konstantyn then consolidated and moved to the Przemyśl Land of the Ruthenian Voivodeship where he owned three fortified estates at Sośnica, Złotowice and Białoboki.

Korniakt's large estate at Sośnica in the county of Jarosław included a manor built around 1580 which was able to repel the frequent attacks of large bands which were common in the area. Korniakt added a residential wing with an entrance gate from the west to the old north wing. Security was improved by a 140 cm thick wall and vertical escarpment. Until 1605 the family kept their valuable items at this castle.

Korniakt established his residence and family stronghold in the village of Bialoboki near Przeworsk. He assumed the name "Konstanty Korniakt of Białobok" and by 1608 had built a small castle on a hill on the site of a former stronghold. The new castle was constructed of brick on a rectangular plan and was surrounded by a moat and swamps and could only be accessed via a drawbridge. The interiors were beautifully decorated and equally well equipped. The floors were made of white stone, as were the sides of the castle.

=== Dispute with Stadnicki ===
Korniakt had inherited a mortgage of the town of Lancut which had been issued by his late uncle Michael Korniakt for 17,000 zlotys. This mortgage had been assumed by Stanisław Stadnicki, "the devil of Łańcut", who had long contested the debt in the royal court. Stadnicki's debt had increased by another 30,000 zlotys for bail after he was sentenced for failure to appear in royal court.

After the death of Konstanty Korniakt's father Stadnicki seized his opportunity and invaded the villages of Krzemienica, Czarna and Albigowa where he robbed the peasants and burned the farm estate. Stadnicki threatened the heirs if they didn't forgive the 47,000 zloty debt. So Korniakt transported the family treasury with a reserve of money and his mother's jewelry to his more fortified but unfinished castle in Sośnica. On the evening of 29 July 1605 this castle was attacked by Stadnicki with 1500 attackers who over two days captured and plundered the castle, kidnapping Konstanty, his wife and daughters. The building had been stripped of everything, including doors and windows.

"Infantry hit the castle gates, the riders launched an attack from the commons where there were neither moats nor walls. At the same time the cannonade was opened and a terrible shout was made in the wake of trumpets and war cauldrons. Soon the gates of the castle were assaulted with cannonballs and assault axes, the infantry invaded the castle and immediately hung its banner on the tower as a sign of triumph. In a moment the castle was full of Stadnicki's soldiers, who rushed to the shops, the caskets, the wardrobes, because the first main goal of such a mercenary party was to rob their own hand. Everything that could be found at home was robbed - says Korniakt - as in ready money, jewels, chains, canoes, crosses, wear, ignites, rings, manels, crowns, pontoons, ferets and various pieces, gemstones as diadems, rubies, sapphires, emeralds, general gold in subtle works made of gold, so in pearls made and not made of considerable size, very costly and expensive, so in portugal, duplon, triplon and other gold coin, also in silver and another coin .... The entire amount of Korniaktów cash was plundered, and the sum was great, which was reported and kept intact during bad adventures, putting a hundred and forty thousand zlotys lightly in hiding"

The women were stripped of what they were wearing, earrings torn off, and two of Konstanty's mother's fingers cut off so they could take expensive rings including her wedding ring and signet ring.

Stadnicki kidnapped and kept Konstanty Korniakt with his wife and daughters in the dungeon of his castle at Łańcut for 8 weeks where they were chained, mistreated and the women were raped. Stadnicki kept the family in the dungeon until Korniakt and his mother signed an agreement for waiver of debts, claims for stolen valuables and damages from the raid on Sosnica.

After his release Korniakt took refuge behind the walls of Lviv and from there he filed new lawsuits for robbery and imprisonment. However this again raised Stadnicki's anger. Korniakt's lawyers Adam Zhidovsky and Andrei Svidnitsky, who were conducting the case, miraculously escaped from the city of Przeworsk with their lives. Then in 1606 Stadnicki, with his armed force of 1200-2000 freely entered Lviv and forced Korniakt to re-sign the waiver.

In 1608 Korniakt built the brick castle at Bialoboki. Stadnicki attacked the castle and there is a legend that after a long fight broke through. But Korniakt managed to escape through a tunnel leading from the castle to the village of Gać. There, a peasant helped him and in disguise he took him to a safe castle in Chodakówka.

Stadnicki became involved in wars with other neighbors and during this time the Kornyakts managed to win four court cases against him. Stadnicki's debt to Korniakt grew to 212 thousand zlotys, but the court reduced the amount of payments by half to encourage a settlement.

After the death of Stanislav Stadnicki in August 1610 Korniakt continued to fight with Stadnicki's three sons and a brother - the Belgian governor Adam Alexander Stadnicki.

=== Military career and private conflicts ===
During the Polish-Swedish war in Livonia (1600-1611) he participated in the Siege of Fellin (May 1602, Viljandi, Estonia), fought in the army of field crown hetman Stanisław Żółkiewski at the Battle of Reval (June 1602, Tallinn, Estonia), and with Jan Karol Chodkiewicz at Battle of Weissenstein (September 1604, Paide, Estonia).

Korniakt was also well known for his private wars with neighbors. In 1603 he wounded captain Stanisław Branicki (d.1620) with a saber.

From 1608 he attacked his neighbor Marcina of Goraja Czuryłęj in Ujkowice, seized the estate of Annę Jaksmanicką of Fredrów, imprisoned nobleman Jaczewskiego, captured the marketplace Przemysl and with the help of Adam Żydowskiego, killed Marcina Sadowskiego. In 1609 he attacked and killed the chorąży of Rudnitsky with his 16 servants, taking their property.

=== Marriage and children ===
Konstantyn Franciszek Korniakt married Elżbieta Ossolińska (d. 1646), the daughter of Jan Zbigniew Ossoliński - the voivode of Sandomierz. Konstantyn and Elżbieta had the following children:

- Anna Korniakt (1608-1648) who married Mikołaj Ossoliński
- Karol Franciszek Korniakt (1610-1672) who in 1664 married Katarzyna Bełżecka (1620-), daughter of the Podole Governor Aleksander.
- Aleksander Zbigniew Korniakt (1612-1639) who married Dorota Czarnkowską (1610-1639).

=== Death and afterward ===
In June of 1624 the Tatars invaded the Przemysl region. As they destroyed the villages they established themselves in a ravine that would someday be called Wolica. Konstantyn Korniakt of Białoboki died from wounds during this invasion as a defender of the Polish lands. He was buried in the Dominican church in Przemyśl. Although the Tatars captured most of the local population as jasyr, they were later intercepted and dealt a crushing defeat at the Battle of Martynów.

When he died Konstanty Korniakt of Białobok left the majority of his estates in the Przemyśl region to his daughter Anna and son-in-law Mikołaj Ossoliński. This included 29 villages and one city including the key of Rybotycze, the castle near Przemyśl, and the properties of Husaków and Miźnice. Rybotycze became the main residence from which Mikołaj made trips to the surrounding area and maintained a regular army there, recruited from the surrounding villages.

Konstanty's eldest son, Karol Franciszek Korniakt owned 11 villages in the Przemyśl region with his base at Białoboki. In the summer of 1630 Karol enrolled at the Jagiellonian University in Kraków and traveled extensively (Germany, Italy, France, Spain, England, Belgium, Holland). He studied military affairs and languages, notably at the University of Graz in Austria, and at University of Padua in Italy (1639). Karol participated in the Polish campaigns and battles and fought in many wars. He financed companies during the Khmelnytsky Uprising (1648-1657). He commanded his own company at the Siege of Zbarazh in 1649, and the Battle of Berestechko in 1651.

== Bibliography ==
- Michał Proksa: Studia nad zamkami i dworami ziemi przemyskiej od połowy XIV do początków XVIII wieku, Przemyśl 2001 (s. 468)
- Władysław Łoziński: Prawem i Lewem, tom I i II, Iskry, Warszawa 2005, ISBN 83-207-1769-8
- Franciszek Młynek i Józef Benbenek: Przeworsk i Okolice, Warszawa 1960
- Zygmunt Gloger: Encyklopedia Staropolska, 1989, ISBN 83-214-0411-1
