= Szegdy =

- Village
- Location within Poland
- Coordinates: 50°17′N 22°43′E
- Country: Poland
- Voivodeship: Subcarpathian
- County: Przeworsk
- Gmina: Adamówka
- Elevation: 190 m (620 ft)
- Time zone: UTC+1 (CET)
  - Summer (DST): UTC+2 (CEST)

Szegdy [ˈʂɛɡdɨ] is a village in the administrative district of Gmina Adamówka, within Przeworsk County, Subcarpathian Voivodeship, in south-eastern Poland.
