= Mikulice, Podkarpackie Voivodeship =

Mikulice
- Village
- Location within Poland
- Coordinates: 50°0′24″N 22°26′25″E
- Country: Poland
- Voivodeship: Subcarpathian
- County: Przeworsk
- Gmina: Gać
- Population: 519

Mikulice [mʲikuˈlʲit͡sɛ] is a village in the administrative district of Gmina Gać, within Przeworsk County, Subcarpathian Voivodeship, in south-eastern Poland.

In 1975–1998 the town administratively belonged to the Przemyśl voivodship .

== History ==
The name of the village likely derives from the renowned name of "Mikuła". In 1375 the village was mentioned for the first time as Myculicze, when Otton from Pilcza gave it to the knight Wierzbięcie. In 1407 there was a stone manor house, and in 1447 the village was in the Kańczuga key. In 1515, the village was mentioned in conscripts as Mykulycze, which had 3 peasant fields. Prior to 1598 it was part of Częstochowa.

After 1589 Mikulice was a noble village, owned by Konstanty Korniakt (the father). It was administratively located in the Przemyśl county of the Ruthenian province. In the 1628 conscript records the village was part of the Białoboki key owned by the Korniakt family of Białobok.

Subsequent owners were: Potocki, Bratkowski, Mierów and Wolski, and in the 19th and 20th centuries by the Stojałowski and Turnau families .

In 1882 Mikulice was described as part of the village of Ostrow of Łańcut county.on the fertile plain of the Markówka river, Wisłok tributary. It had an area of 461 mr. roli, 15 lak iogr, 13 past, and 8 mr. lasu; pos. mn. 53 roli.

Mikulice was the location of the manor of Jerzy Turnau (1869-1925), a talented artist but also extremely talented landowner. He was a graduate of the Hochschule für Bodenkultur in Vienna, known as an agricultural innovator. Jerzy was the co-founder of the largest Polish vineyard today, Zbigniew. He was also the great-grandfather of the famous musician Grzegorz Turnau.

The Turnau manor was destroyed by fire 13 November 1993 and later demolished.
