= Dębów, Podkarpackie Voivodeship =

Dębów
- Village
- Location within Poland
- Coordinates: 50°2′40″N 22°26′27″E
- Country: Poland
- Voivodeship: Subcarpathian
- County: Przeworsk
- Gmina: Gać
- Population: 1,244
- Website: http://www.debow-parafia.pl

Dębów [ˈdɛmbuf] is a village in the administrative district of Gmina Gać, within Przeworsk County, Subcarpathian Voivodeship, in south-eastern Poland.

== See also ==
- Walddeutsche
