= Leżachów =

- Village
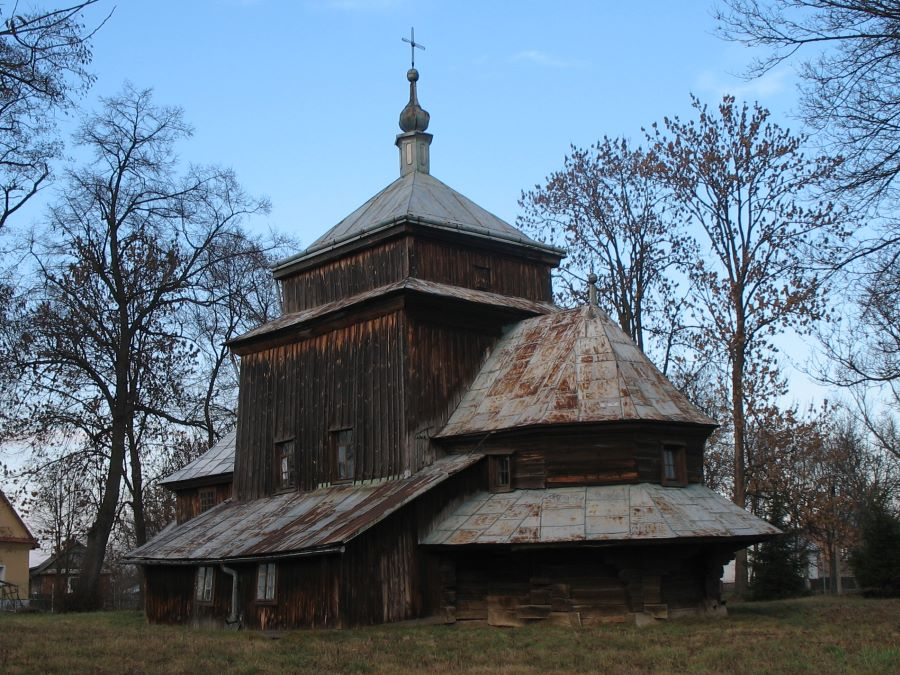
- Greek Catholic church

- Location within Poland
- Coordinates: 50°9′N 22°37′E
- Country: Poland
- Voivodeship: Subcarpathian
- County: Przeworsk
- Gmina: Sieniawa
- Population: 500

Leżachów [lɛˈʐaxuf] is a village in the administrative district of Gmina Sieniawa, within Przeworsk County, Subcarpathian Voivodeship, in south-eastern Poland.
