= Rączyna =

- Village
- Location within Poland
- Coordinates: 49°55′N 22°27′E
- Country: Poland
- Voivodeship: Subcarpathian
- County: Przeworsk
- Gmina: Kańczuga
- Population (approx.): 1,000

Rączyna [rɔnˈt͡ʂɨna] is a village in the administrative district of Gmina Kańczuga, within Przeworsk County, Subcarpathian Voivodeship, in south-eastern Poland.
