= Wola Rzeplińska =

- Village
- Location within Poland
- Coordinates: 49°53′N 22°24′E
- Country: Poland
- Voivodeship: Subcarpathian
- County: Przeworsk
- Gmina: Kańczuga

Wola Rzeplińska [ˈvɔla ʐɛˈplʲiɲska] is a village in the administrative district of Gmina Kańczuga, within Przeworsk County, Subcarpathian Voivodeship, in south-eastern Poland.
