= Krzeczowice =

- Village
- Location within Poland
- Coordinates: 49°59′N 22°27′E
- Country: Poland
- Voivodeship: Subcarpathian
- County: Przeworsk
- Gmina: Kańczuga

Krzeczowice [kʂɛt͡ʂɔˈvʲit͡sɛ] is a village in the administrative district of Gmina Kańczuga, within Przeworsk County, Subcarpathian Voivodeship, in south-eastern Poland.

== See also ==
- Walddeutsche
