= Pantalowice =

- Village
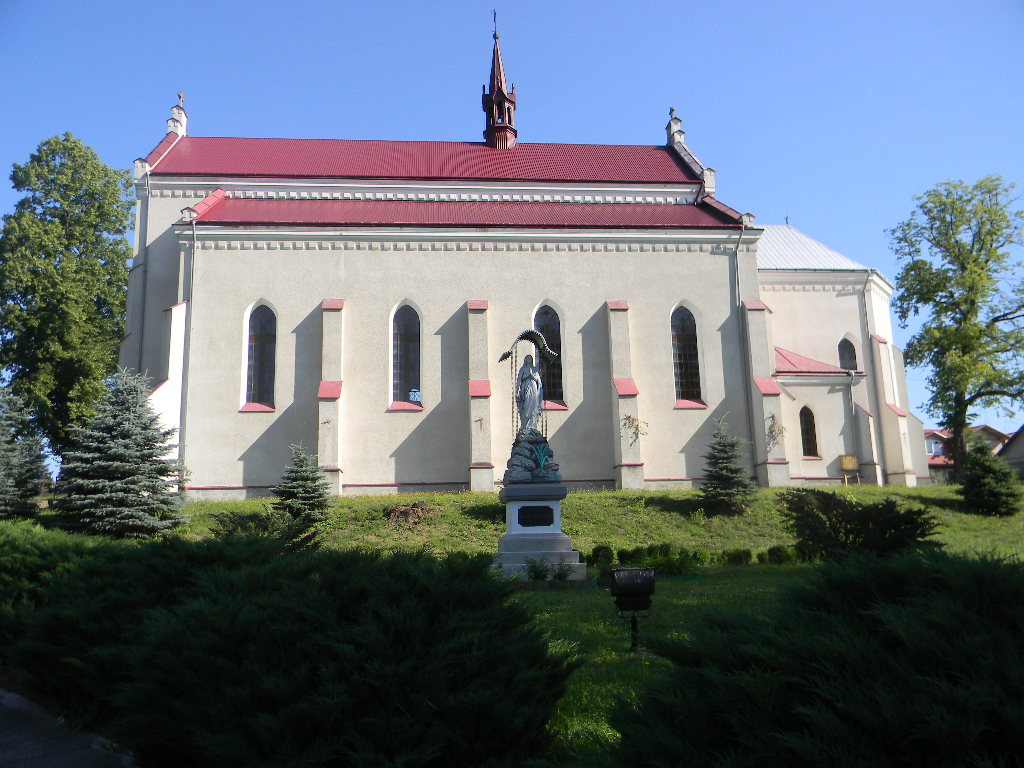
- Church of the Immaculate Conception of Mary in Pantalowice

- Location within Poland
- Coordinates: 49°57′N 22°27′E
- Country: Poland
- Voivodeship: Subcarpathian
- County: Przeworsk
- Gmina: Kańczuga
- Time zone: UTC+1 (CET)
  - Summer (DST): UTC+2 (CEST)
- Vehicle registration: RPZ

Pantalowice [pantalɔˈvʲit͡sɛ] is a village in the administrative district of Gmina Kańczuga, within Przeworsk County, Subcarpathian Voivodeship, in south-eastern Poland.

== History ==
In 1866 local Poles built the first school in Pantalowice.

During the German occupation of Poland (World War II), in December 1942, the Germans murdered six Poles, three men and three women, in Pantalowice, for helping Jews. The Poles were denounced by 18-year-old Jewish woman Małka Schönfeld, whom they helped, after the Germans promised to spare her life in exchange for information about Poles, who helped Jews. In March 1943, the Germans murdered 11 Polish inhabitants suspected of participating in the Polish resistance movement (see Nazi crimes against the Polish nation).

== Sports ==
The local football club is Lechia Pantalowice. It competes in the lower leagues.
