= Cieplice, Podkarpackie Voivodeship =

Cieplice
- Village
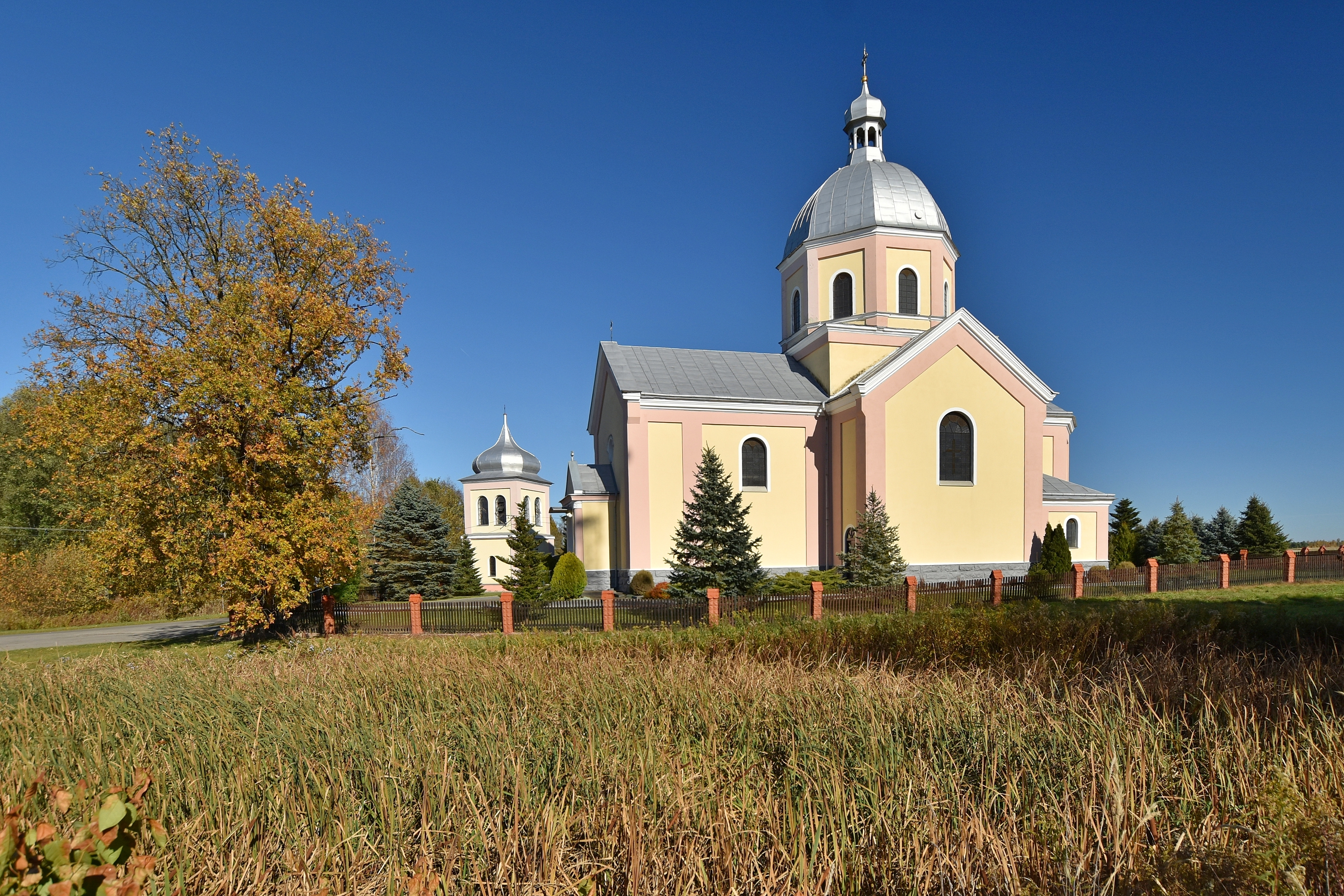
- Church of Saints Peter and Paul the Apostles

- Location within Poland
- Coordinates: 50°15′14″N 22°36′56″E
- Country: Poland
- Voivodeship: Subcarpathian
- County: Przeworsk
- Gmina: Adamówka

Population
  - Total: 740

Cieplice [t͡ɕɛˈplʲit͡sɛ] is a village in the administrative district of Gmina Adamówka, within Przeworsk County, Subcarpathian Voivodeship, in south-eastern Poland.
