= Siedleczka =

- Village
- Location within Poland
- Coordinates: 49°58′N 22°22′E
- Country: Poland
- Voivodeship: Subcarpathian
- County: Przeworsk
- Gmina: Kańczuga

Siedleczka [ɕɛdˈlɛt͡ʂka] is a village in the administrative district of Gmina Kańczuga, within Przeworsk County, Subcarpathian Voivodeship, in south-eastern Poland.
