= Mirocin =

- Village
- Location within Poland
- Coordinates: 50°2′N 22°32′E
- Country: Poland
- Voivodeship: Subcarpathian
- County: Przeworsk
- Gmina: Przeworsk

Mirocin [mʲiˈrɔt͡ɕin] is a village in the administrative district of Gmina Przeworsk, within Przeworsk County, Subcarpathian Voivodeship, in south-eastern Poland.
