= Lipnik, Podkarpackie Voivodeship =

Lipnik
- Village
- Location within Poland
- Coordinates: 49°59′N 22°18′E
- Country: Poland
- Voivodeship: Subcarpathian
- County: Przeworsk
- Gmina: Kańczuga

Lipnik (Polish pronunciation: [ˈlipɲik]) is a village in the administrative district of Gmina Kańczuga, within Przeworsk County, Subcarpathian Voivodeship, in south-eastern Poland.
