= Dobcza =

- Village
- Location within Poland
- Coordinates: 50°14′N 22°45′E
- Country: Poland
- Voivodeship: Subcarpathian
- County: Przeworsk
- Gmina: Adamówka
- Population: 250

Dobcza [ˈdɔpt͡ʂa] is a village in the administrative district of Gmina Adamówka, within Przeworsk County, Subcarpathian Voivodeship, in south-eastern Poland.
