= Gorliczyna-Szewnia =

- Village
- Location within Poland
- Coordinates: 50°05′12″N 22°32′43″E
- Country: Poland
- Voivodeship: Podkarpackie
- County: Przeworsk
- Gmina: Przeworsk

Gorliczyna-Szewnia [ɡɔrlʲiˈt͡ʂɨna ˈʂɛvɲa] is a village in the administrative district of Gmina Przeworsk, within Przeworsk County, Podkarpackie Voivodeship, in south-eastern Poland.
