= Czerwona Wola, Podkarpackie Voivodeship =

Czerwona Wola
- Village
- Location within Poland
- Coordinates: 50°9′N 22°43′E
- Country: Poland
- Voivodeship: Subcarpathian
- County: Przeworsk
- Gmina: Sieniawa
- Population: 483

Czerwona Wola [t͡ʂɛrˈvɔna ˈvɔla] is a village in the administrative district of Gmina Sieniawa, within Przeworsk County, Subcarpathian Voivodeship, in south-eastern Poland.
