= Dobra, Przeworsk County =

Dobra
- Village
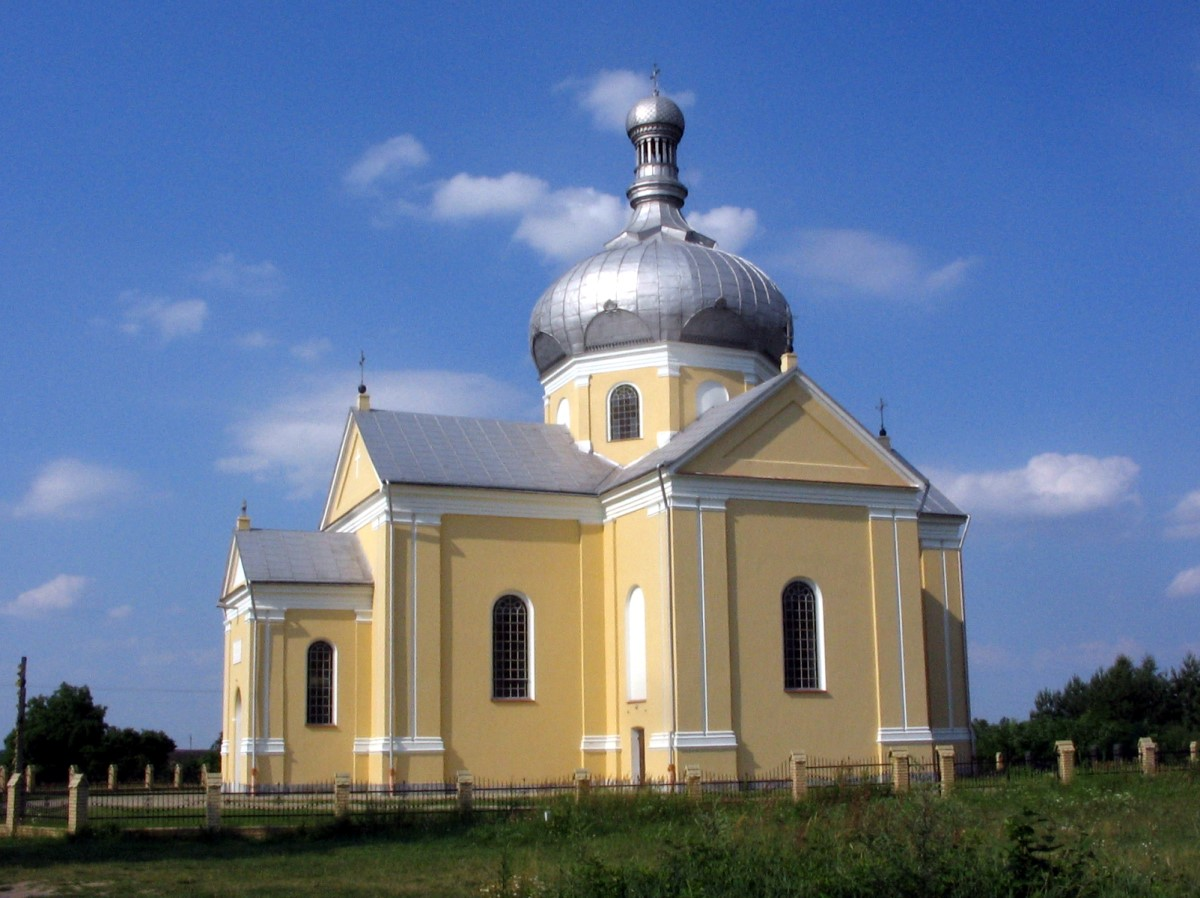
- Greek Catholic church

- Location within Poland
- Coordinates: 50°11′43″N 22°41′08″E
- Country: Poland
- Voivodeship: Subcarpathian
- County: Przeworsk
- Gmina: Sieniawa
- Population: 490

Dobra [ˈdɔbra] is a village in the administrative district of Gmina Sieniawa, within Przeworsk County, Subcarpathian Voivodeship, in south-eastern Poland.
