= Łopuszka Wielka =

- Village
- Location within Poland
- Coordinates: 49°56′N 22°24′E
- Country: Poland
- Voivodeship: Subcarpathian
- County: Przeworsk
- Gmina: Kańczuga

Łopuszka Wielka [wɔˈpuʂka ˈvʲɛlka] is a village in the administrative district of Gmina Kańczuga, within Przeworsk County, Subcarpathian Voivodeship, in south-eastern Poland.

== Toponymy ==
The etymology of the village's name has been a topic of debate among scholars. One school of thought posits that the toponym is derived from the prevalence of burdock vegetation in the region, which is believed to have given rise to the name. This theory was initially postulated by Franciszek Młynek and Józef Bębenek, Polish regionalists. Conversely, another perspective suggests that the toponym was derived from the legendary figure Łopuszno, who is purported to have founded the settlement. Further research is required to conclusively determine the origin of the village's name.
