= Stobno =

Stobno may refer to the following places in Poland:

- Stobno, Lower Silesian Voivodeship (south-west Poland)
- Stobno, Kuyavian-Pomeranian Voivodeship (north-central Poland)
- Stobno, Czarnków-Trzcianka County in Greater Poland Voivodeship (west-central Poland)
- Stobno, Kalisz County in Greater Poland Voivodeship (west-central Poland)
- Stobno, West Pomeranian Voivodeship (north-west Poland)
