= Pawłowa, Podkarpackie Voivodeship =

Pawłowa
- Village
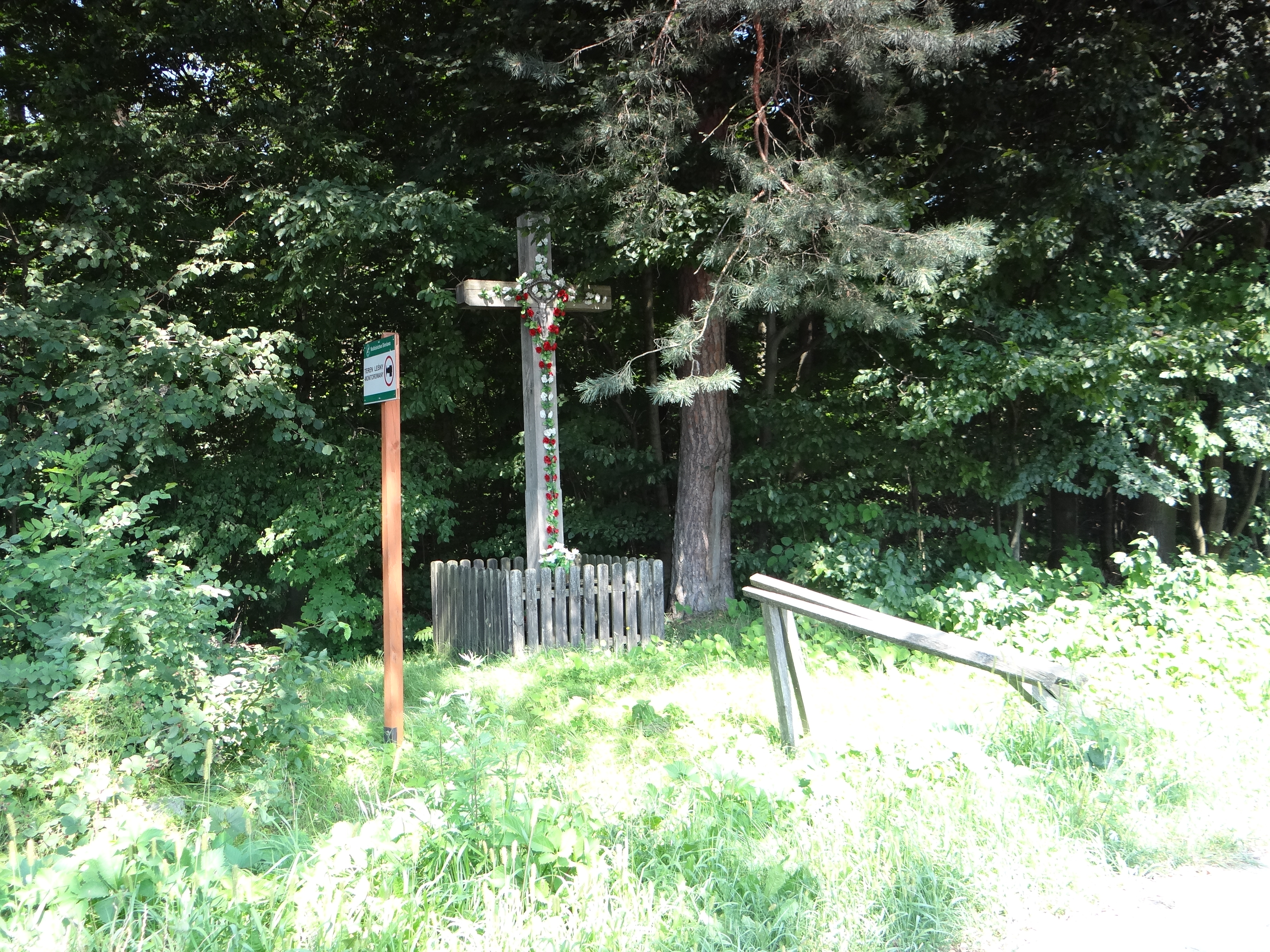
- Wayside cross in Pawłowa

- Location within Poland
- Coordinates: 50°15′18″N 22°46′21″E
- Country: Poland
- Voivodeship: Subcarpathian
- County: Przeworsk
- Gmina: Adamówka

Population
  - Total: 160
- Time zone: UTC+1 (CET)
  - Summer (DST): UTC+2 (CEST)
- Vehicle registration: RPZ

Pawłowa [pavˈwɔva] is a village in the administrative district of Gmina Adamówka, within Przeworsk County, Subcarpathian Voivodeship, in south-eastern Poland.

Four Polish citizens were murdered by Nazi Germany in the village during World War II.
