= Paluch =

Paluch (Polish pronunciation: [ˈpa.lux]), Palluch, Palúch, Paľuch, Paľúch, or Palyukh (Ukrainian: Палюх) are surnames of Polish, Slovak, and Ukrainian origin. "Paluch" means "big toe" in Polish. In Slovakia, the surname Palúch comes from the given name Pavol (Paul). It may refer to:

- Anna Paluch (born 1960), Polish politician
- Ewa Paluch, Polish-French biophysicist and cell biologist
- Ivan Palúch (1940–2015), Slovak actor
- Jean Palluch (1923–1971), French footballer
- Paulina Paluch (born 1998), Polish athlete
- Peter Palúch (born 1958), Slovak football player
- Scott Paluch (born 1966), American ice hockey player
- Serhiy Palyukh (born 1996), Ukrainian footballer
- Sławomir Paluch (born 1975), Polish footballer
- Walter P. Paluch, Jr. (1927–2011), Brigadier General in the United States Air Force
- Jonas Paluch (born 1999), Danish YouTuber

== See also ==
- Paluch, Warsaw, a neighbourhood of Warsaw, Poland
- Paluchy, village in south-eastern Poland
