= Sieniawa =

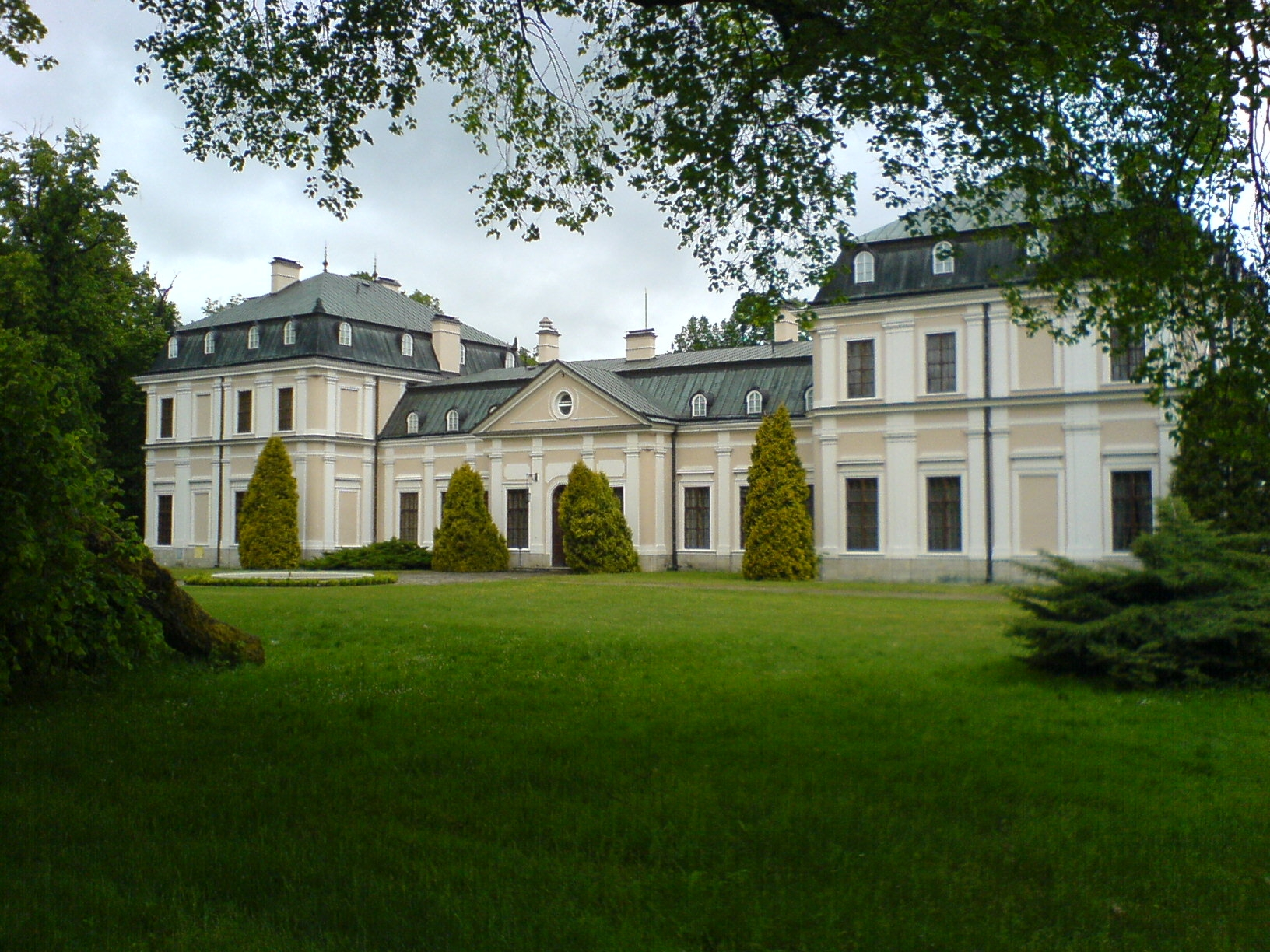
- Sieniawa Palace

- Coat of arms

- Location within Poland
- Coordinates: 50°10′41″N 22°36′38″E
- Country: Poland
- Voivodeship: Subcarpathian
- County: Przeworsk
- Gmina: Sieniawa
- Town rights: 1676

Government
  - Mayor: Witold Mrożek

Area
  - Total: 6.76 km^{2} (2.61 sq mi)

Population (2006)
  - Total: 2,065
  - Density: 305/km^{2} (791/sq mi)
- Time zone: UTC+1 (CET)
  - Summer (DST): UTC+2 (CEST)
- Postal code: 37-530
- Vehicle registration: RPZ
- Website: www.sieniawa.pl

Sieniawa (Polish: [ɕɛˈɲava]), is a town in southeastern Poland, in Przeworsk County in the Subcarpathian Voivodeship. It had a population of 2,127 inhabitants (02.06.2009).

== History ==
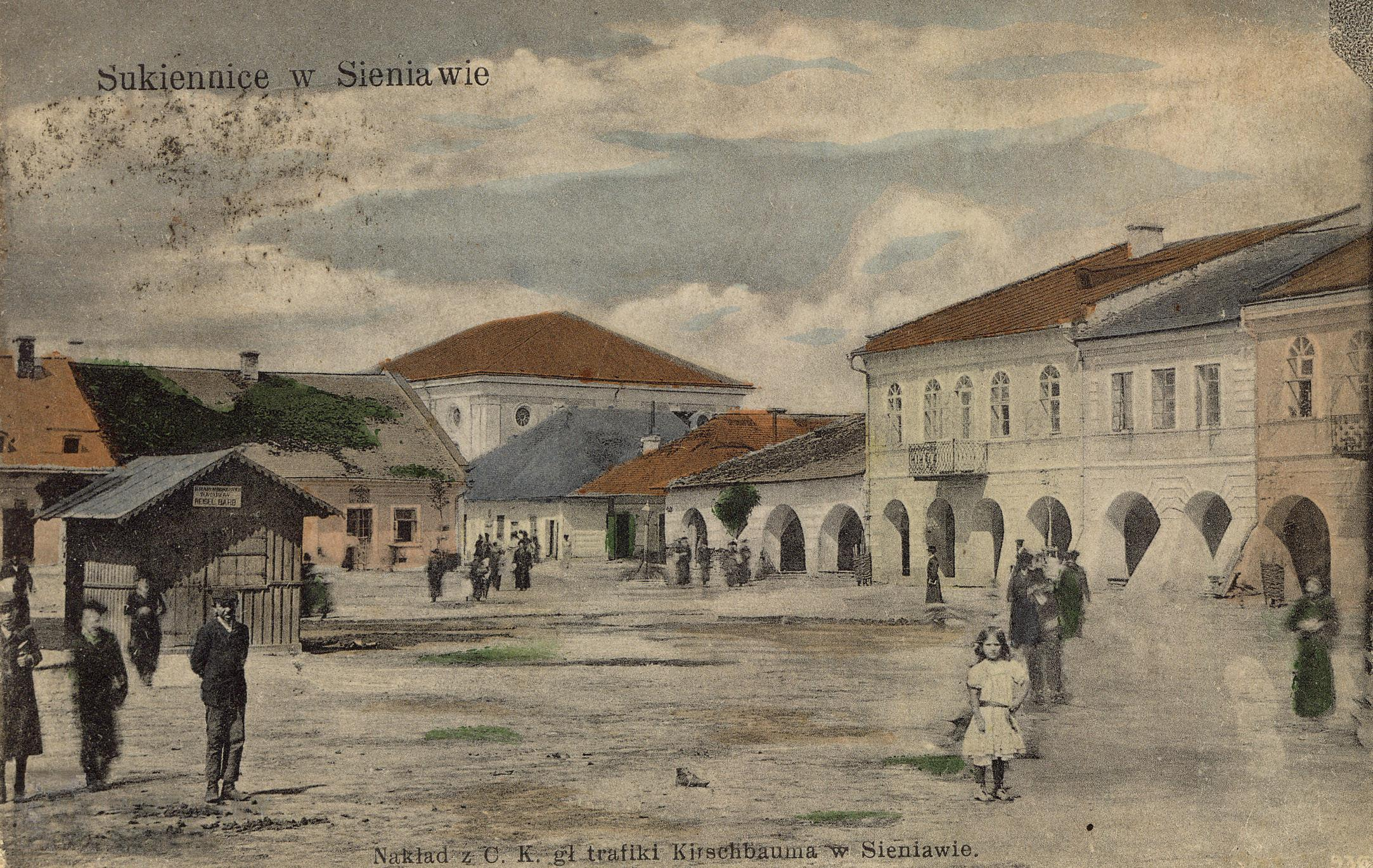
Sieniawa in c. 1910

Sieniawa's history dates back to the 17th century, and the town owes its existence to the once powerful Sieniawski family. It was founded in 1676, on initiative of Voivode of Volhynia and Starosta of Lwów, Mikolaj Hieronim Sieniawski, who owned enormous estates in eastern lands of the Polish–Lithuanian Commonwealth.

Sieniawa was founded in the area which was covered by the village of Dybków. The Sieniawski family wanted to make it main administrative center of their estates. In ca. 1650, a brick fortress was built on a hill near contemporary Sieniawa. In the following years, the Sieniawski family built their manor house near the fortress, and began construction of the town, together with the San river port. A Dominican church and abbey was built, and in the 1660s, walls were built, to protect Sieniawa from Crimean Tatars raids. Mikolaj Hieronim Sieniawski, the founder of the town, died at the age of 39, but his son Adam Mikolaj Sieniawski continued the work of his father, and invested heavily in Sieniawa. In 1731, Adam's daughter Maria Zofia married Prince August Aleksander Czartoryski, and Sieniawa became property of the Czartoryski family.

Until 1772, Sieniawa remained an important river port and a defensive establishment. Following the Partitions of Poland, the situation changed, and fortifications were not needed any longer. Since the new Austrian - Russian border was north of Sieniawa, the San lost its function of a waterway, and the town stagnated as part of Austrian Galicia. In 1855, Sieniawa belonged to the District of Przemyśl. The town remained property of the Czartoryski family, and was famous across Galicia for its bricklayers.

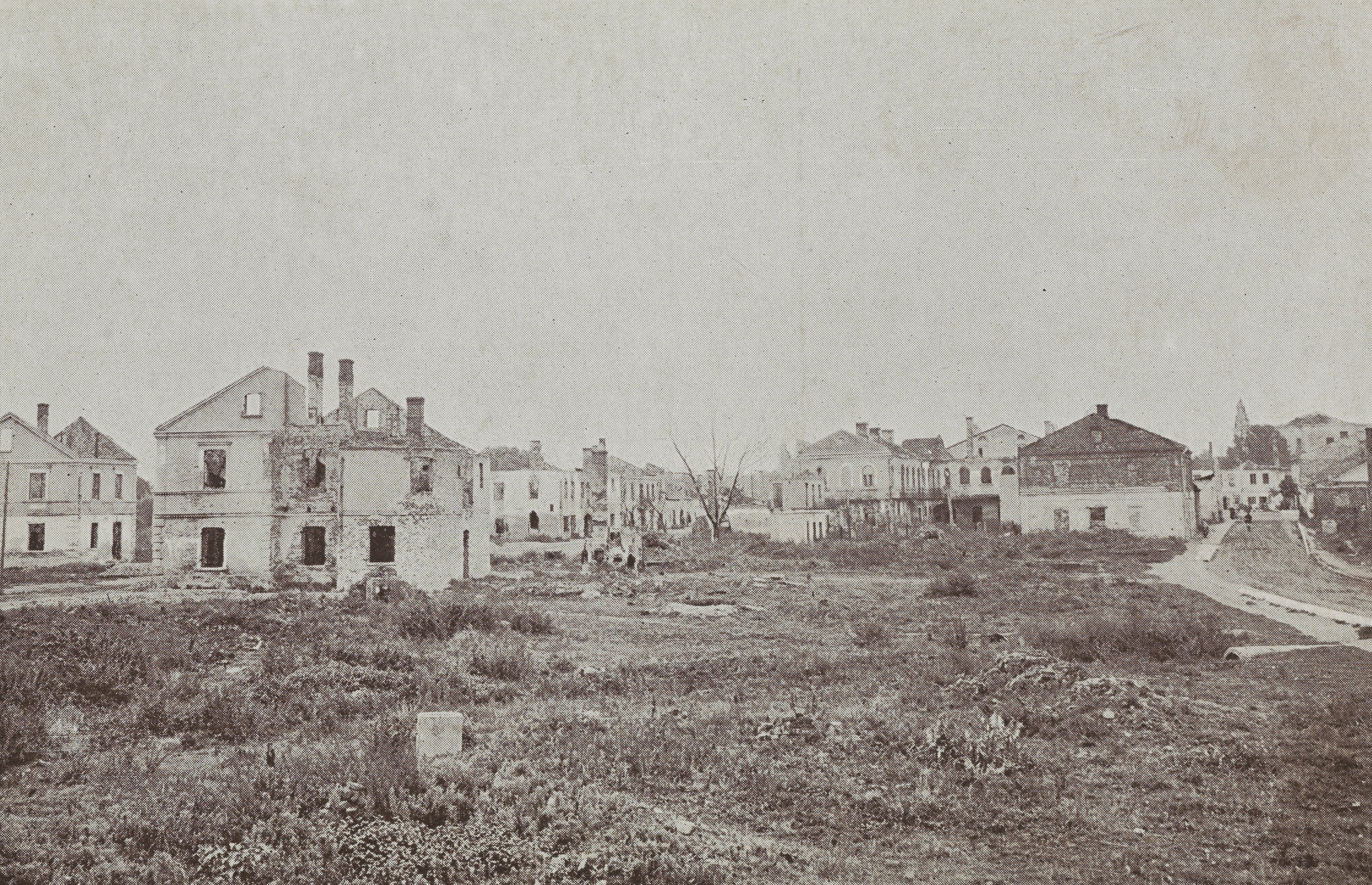
Destruction during World War I

In May 1915 Sieniawa was almost completely destroyed, and in November 1918 the town became part of Second Polish Republic’s Lwów Voivodeship. In the interwar period, Sieniawa's population declined, and unemployment was high, which resulted in street fights and demonstrations.

After the 1939 Invasion of Poland, Sieniawa was occupied by the Soviet Union, and between September 1939-June 1941, was a border town. Afterwards it was occupied by Nazi Germany until 1944. During the Holocaust, the town was the site of a Jewish ghetto.

== Notable people ==
- Eliezer Simon Kirschbaum (1797–1860), writer
