= Żuklin =

- Village
- Location within Poland
- Coordinates: 49°59′N 22°27′E
- Country: Poland
- Voivodeship: Subcarpathian
- County: Przeworsk
- Gmina: Kańczuga
- Elevation: 210 m (690 ft)
- Population (approx.): 350

Żuklin [ˈʐuklʲin] is a village located in the administrative district of Gmina Kańczuga, within Przeworsk County, Subcarpathian Voivodeship of in south-eastern Poland.

== Places to see ==
The palace in which the Kellermans have lived in since the 19th century is under construction and is owned privately.
