= Krasne, Przeworsk County =

Krasne
- Village
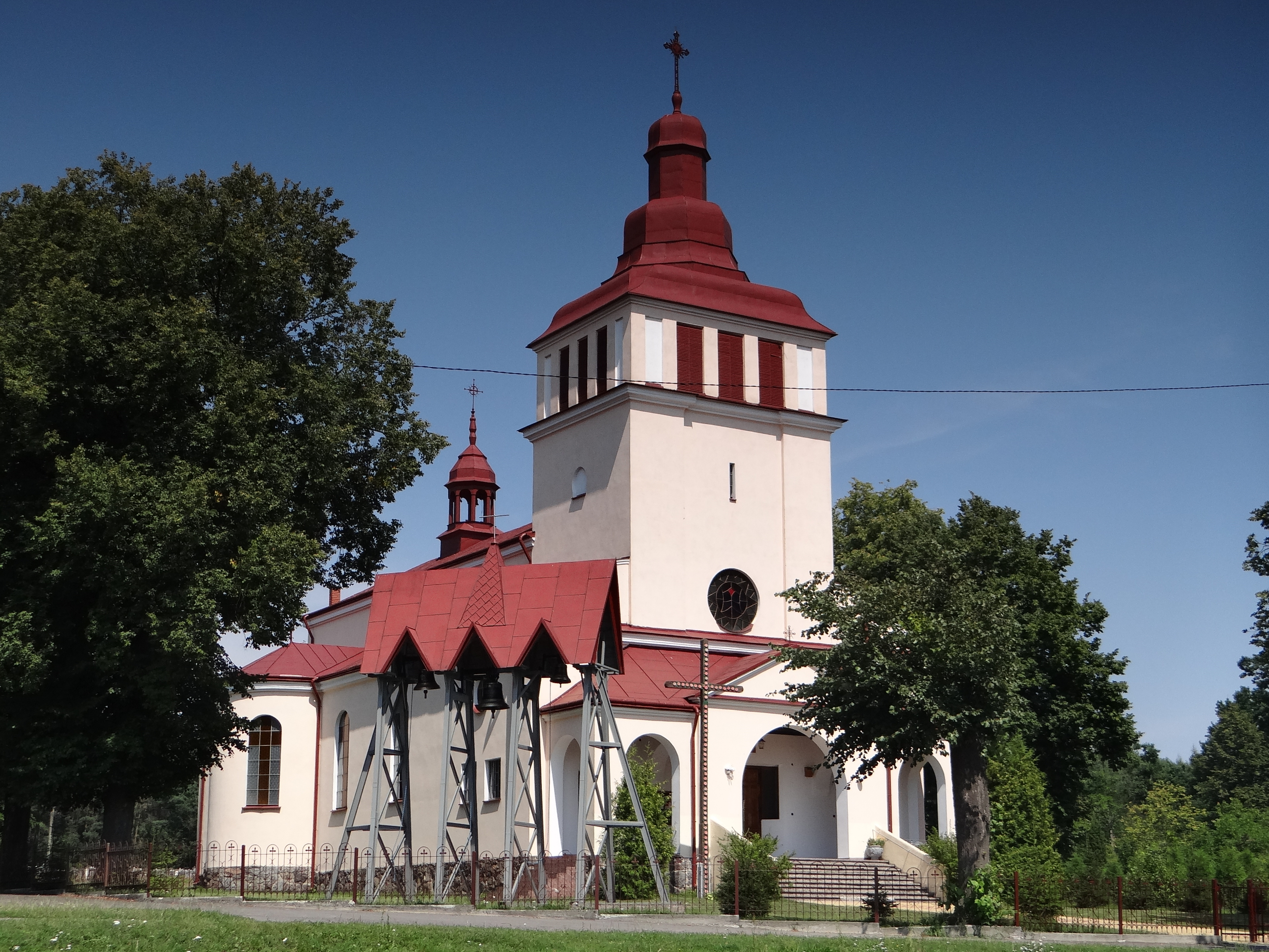
- Church of Saint Jude Thaddeus

- Location within Poland
- Coordinates: 50°15′7″N 22°43′43″E
- Country: Poland
- Voivodeship: Subcarpathian
- County: Przeworsk
- Gmina: Adamówka

Population
  - Total: 360

Krasne [ˈkrasnɛ] is a village in the administrative district of Gmina Adamówka, within Przeworsk County, Subcarpathian Voivodeship, in south-eastern Poland.
