= Łopuszka Mała =

- Village
- Location within Poland
- Coordinates: 49°58′N 22°26′E
- Country: Poland
- Voivodeship: Subcarpathian
- County: Przeworsk
- Gmina: Kańczuga

Łopuszka Mała [wɔˈpuʂka ˈmawa] is a village in the administrative district of Gmina Kańczuga, within Przeworsk County, Subcarpathian Voivodeship, in south-eastern Poland.
