= Wojciechówka, Podkarpackie Voivodeship =

Wojciechówka
- Village
- Location within Poland
- Coordinates: 50°01′44″N 22°28′00″E
- Country: Poland
- Voivodeship: Podkarpackie
- County: Przeworsk
- Gmina: Przeworsk

Wojciechówka (Polish pronunciation: [vɔjt͡ɕɛˈxufka]) is a village in the administrative district of Gmina Przeworsk, within Przeworsk County, Podkarpackie Voivodeship, in south-eastern Poland.
