= Świętoniowa =

- Village
- Location within Poland
- Coordinates: 50°6′N 22°26′E
- Country: Poland
- Voivodeship: Subcarpathian
- County: Przeworsk
- Gmina: Przeworsk
- Population (approx.): 800

Świętoniowa (Polish pronunciation: [ɕfjɛntɔˈɲɔva]) is a village in the administrative district of Gmina Przeworsk, within Przeworsk County, Subcarpathian Voivodeship, in south-eastern Poland.
