= Wylewa =

- Village
- Location within Poland
- Coordinates: 50°12′N 22°38′E
- Country: Poland
- Voivodeship: Subcarpathian
- County: Przeworsk
- Gmina: Sieniawa
- Population: 846

Wylewa [vɨˈlɛva] is a village in the administrative district of Gmina Sieniawa, within Przeworsk County, Subcarpathian Voivodeship, in south-eastern Poland.
