= Rudka, Podkarpackie Voivodeship =

Rudka
- Village
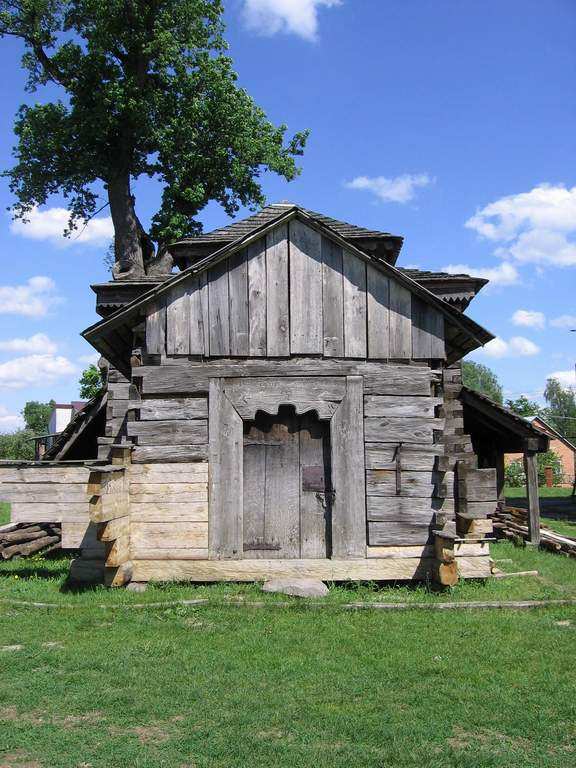
- Greek Catholic church

- Location within Poland
- Coordinates: 50°13′30″N 22°37′54″E
- Country: Poland
- Voivodeship: Subcarpathian
- County: Przeworsk
- Gmina: Sieniawa
- Population: 860

Rudka [ˈrutka] is a village in the administrative district of Gmina Sieniawa, within Przeworsk County, Subcarpathian Voivodeship, in south-eastern Poland.
