= Medynia Kańczucka =

- Village
- Location within Poland
- Coordinates: 49°56′N 22°22′E
- Country: Poland
- Voivodeship: Subcarpathian
- County: Przeworsk
- Gmina: Kańczuga

Medynia Kańczucka [mɛˈdɨɲa kaɲˈt͡ʂut͡ska] is a village in the administrative district of Gmina Kańczuga, within Przeworsk County, Subcarpathian Voivodeship, in south-eastern Poland.
