= Gwizdaj =

- Village
- Location within Poland
- Coordinates: 50°03′44″N 22°27′33″E
- Country: Poland
- Voivodeship: Subcarpathian
- County: Przeworsk
- Gmina: Przeworsk

Gwizdaj [ˈɡvʲizdai̯] is a village in the administrative district of Gmina Przeworsk, within Przeworsk County, Subcarpathian Voivodeship, in south-eastern Poland.
