= Rozbórz =

- Village
- Location within Poland
- Coordinates: 50°3′N 22°33′E
- Country: Poland
- Voivodeship: Subcarpathian
- County: Przeworsk
- Gmina: Przeworsk
- Population: 2,005

Rozbórz [ˈrɔzbuʂ] is a village in the administrative district of Gmina Przeworsk, within Przeworsk County, Subcarpathian Voivodeship, in south-eastern Poland.
