= Chałupki, Przeworsk County =

Chałupki
- Village
- Location within Poland
- Coordinates: 50°05′03″N 22°31′37″E
- Country: Poland
- Voivodeship: Subcarpathian
- County: Przeworsk
- Gmina: Przeworsk

Chałupki [xaˈwupkʲi] is a village in the administrative district of Gmina Przeworsk, within Przeworsk County, Subcarpathian Voivodeship, in south-eastern Poland.
