= Stobno Siódme =

- Village
- Location within Poland
- Coordinates: 51°41′09″N 18°08′46″E
- Country: Poland
- Voivodeship: Greater Poland
- County: Kalisz
- Gmina: Godziesze Wielkie

Stobno Siódme [ˈstɔbnɔ ˈɕudmɛ] is a village in the administrative district of Gmina Godziesze Wielkie, within Kalisz County, Greater Poland Voivodeship, in west-central Poland.
