= Gmina Kańczuga =

Gmina Kańczuga Kańczuga Commune
- Gmina
- Coat of arms
- Interactive map of Gmina Kańczuga
- Coordinates (Kańczuga): 50°0′N 22°24′E
- Country: Poland
- Voivodeship: Subcarpathian
- County: Przeworsk
- Seat: Kańczuga

Area
  - Total: 105.15 km^{2} (40.60 sq mi)

Population (2011)
  - Total: 12,625
  - Density: 120.07/km^{2} (310.97/sq mi)
  - Urban: 3,230
  - Rural: 9,395
- Website: https://web.archive.org/web/20071012222333/http://kanczuga.internetdsl.pl/

Gmina Kańczuga is an urban-rural gmina (administrative district) in Przeworsk County, Subcarpathian Voivodeship, in south-eastern Poland. Its seat is the town of Kańczuga, which lies approximately 11 kilometres (7 mi) south-west of Przeworsk and 29 km (18 mi) east of the regional capital Rzeszów.

The gmina covers an area of 105.15 square kilometres (40.6 sq mi), and as of 2006 its total population is 12,726 (out of which the population of Kańczuga amounts to 3,211, and the population of the rural part of the gmina is 9,515).

== Villages ==
Apart from the town of Kańczuga, Gmina Kańczuga contains the villages and settlements of Bóbrka Kańczucka, Chodakówka, Krzeczowice, Lipnik, Łopuszka Mała, Łopuszka Wielka, Medynia Kańczucka, Niżatyce, Pantalowice, Rączyna, Siedleczka, Sietesz, Wola Rzeplińska and Żuklin.

== Neighbouring gminas ==
Gmina Kańczuga is bordered by the gminas of Dubiecko, Gać, Jawornik Polski, Markowa, Pruchnik, Przeworsk and Zarzecze.
