= Eliezer Simon Kirschbaum =

Austrian physician and writer

Eliezer Simon Kirschbaum (1797–1860) was a medical doctor and writer from the Austrian Empire.

== Biography ==
He was born in Sieniawa, Galicia, 1797 and died in Kraków in 1860. After studying philosophy and medicine in Berlin, he settled as a medical doctor in Kraków, and as "Der Berliner Doctor" soon acquired an extensive practice and accumulated a considerable fortune.

In order to be able to secure the estate of Siemota, near Chrzanów, he adopted the Christian religion, and assumed the name of "Sigismund." As a married man he permitted his wife to remain a law-abiding Jew throughout her life.

Kirschbaum was the author of a long Hebrew essay, entitled "Hilkot Yeme ha-Mashiaḥ." In the German language he published "Der Jüdische Alexandrinismus," Leipzig, 1841, and "Der Familie Apotheose," Kraków, 1858.
