= Gmina Sieniawa =

Gmina Sieniawa Sieniawa Commune
- Gmina
- Coat of arms
- Interactive map of Gmina Sieniawa
- Coordinates (Sieniawa): 50°10′41″N 22°36′38″E
- Country: Poland
- Voivodeship: Subcarpathian
- County: Przeworsk
- Seat: Sieniawa

Area
  - Total: 127.31 km^{2} (49.15 sq mi)

Population (2011)
  - Total: 7,010
  - Density: 55.1/km^{2} (143/sq mi)
  - Urban: 2,173
  - Rural: 4,837
- Website: http://www.sieniawa.pl

Gmina Sieniawa is an urban-rural gmina (administrative district) in Przeworsk County, Subcarpathian Voivodeship, in south-eastern Poland. Its seat is the town of Sieniawa, which lies approximately 15 kilometres (9 mi) north-east of Przeworsk and 47 km (29 mi) east of the regional capital Rzeszów.

The gmina covers an area of 127.31 square kilometres (49.2 sq mi), and as of 2006 its total population is 6,806 (out of which the population of Sieniawa amounts to 2,065, and the population of the rural part of the gmina is 4,741).

== Villages ==
Apart from the town of Sieniawa, Gmina Sieniawa contains the villages and settlements of Czerce, Czerwona Wola, Dobra, Dybków, Leżachów, Paluchy, Pigany, Rudka and Wylewa.

== Neighbouring gminas ==
Gmina Sieniawa is bordered by the gminas of Adamówka, Jarosław, Leżajsk, Tryńcza and Wiązownica.
