= Godziesze Wielkie =

- Village
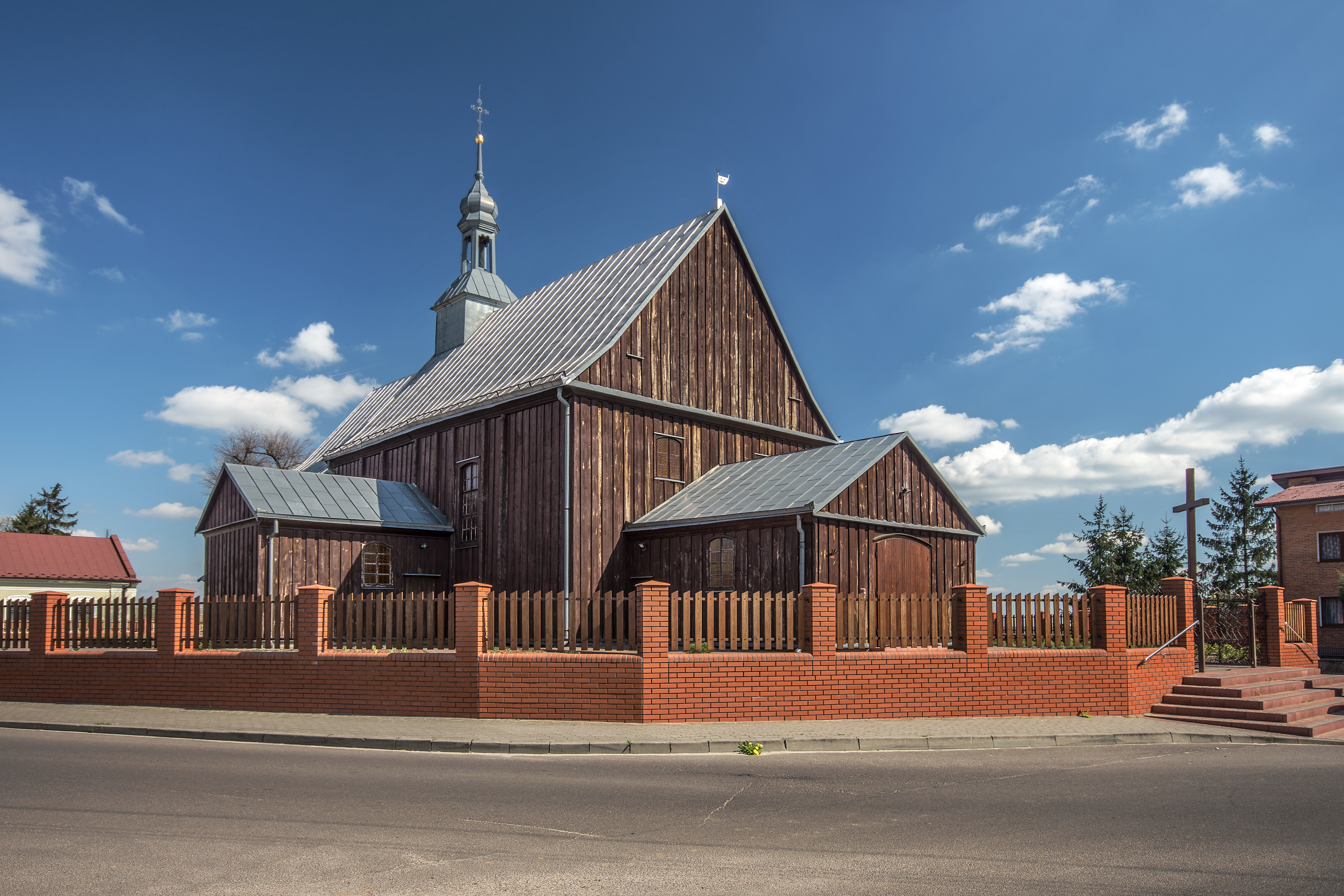
- Church of Saint Bartholomew

- Location within Poland
- Coordinates: 51°39′N 18°11′E
- Country: Poland
- Voivodeship: Greater Poland
- County: Kalisz
- Gmina: Godziesze Wielkie

Population
  - Total: 720

Godziesze Wielkie [ɡɔˈd͡ʑɛʂɛ ˈvjɛlkʲɛ] is a village in Kalisz County, Greater Poland Voivodeship, in west-central Poland. It is the seat of the gmina (administrative district) called Gmina Godziesze Wielkie.

In 2002, a forest was planted near the village in memory of victims of the 2001 terrorist attacks on the World Trade Center. Over 5,000 trees were planted in the clearing after the fire.

== Notable residents ==
- Karolina Pawliczak (born 1976), lawyer and politician
