= Gmina Godziesze Wielkie =

Gmina Godziesze Wielkie Godziesze Wielkie Commune
- Gmina
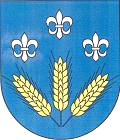
- Coat of arms

- Coordinates (Godziesze Wielkie): 51°39′N 18°11′E
- Country: Poland
- Voivodeship: Greater Poland
- County: Kalisz County
- Seat: Godziesze Wielkie

Area
  - Total: 105.07 km^{2} (40.57 sq mi)

Population (2006)
  - Total: 8,385
  - Density: 79.80/km^{2} (206.7/sq mi)
- Website: https://web.archive.org/web/20080214171011/http://www.godziesze-wielkie.pl/

Gmina Godziesze Wielkie is a rural gmina (administrative district) in Kalisz County, Greater Poland Voivodeship, in west-central Poland. Its seat is the village of Godziesze Wielkie, which lies approximately 14 kilometres (9 mi) south-east of Kalisz and 121 km (75 mi) south-east of the regional capital Poznań.

The gmina covers an area of 105.07 square kilometres (40.6 sq mi), and as of 2006 its total population is 9441.

== Villages ==
Gmina Godziesze Wielkie contains the villages and settlements of Bałdoń, Biała, Borek, Godziesze Małe, Godziesze Wielkie, Godzieszki, Józefów, Kakawa-Kolonia, Kąpie, Końska Wieś, Kopie, Krzemionka, Nowa Kakawa, Rafałów, Saczyn, Skrzatki, Stara Kakawa, Stobno, Stobno Siódme, Takomyśle, Wola Droszewska, Wolica, Zadowice, Zajączki Bankowe and Żydów.

== Neighbouring gminas ==
Gmina Godziesze Wielkie is bordered by the city of Kalisz and by the gminas of Brzeziny, Nowe Skalmierzyce, Opatówek, Sieroszewice and Szczytniki.
