= Karolina Pawliczak =

Polish politician (born 1976)

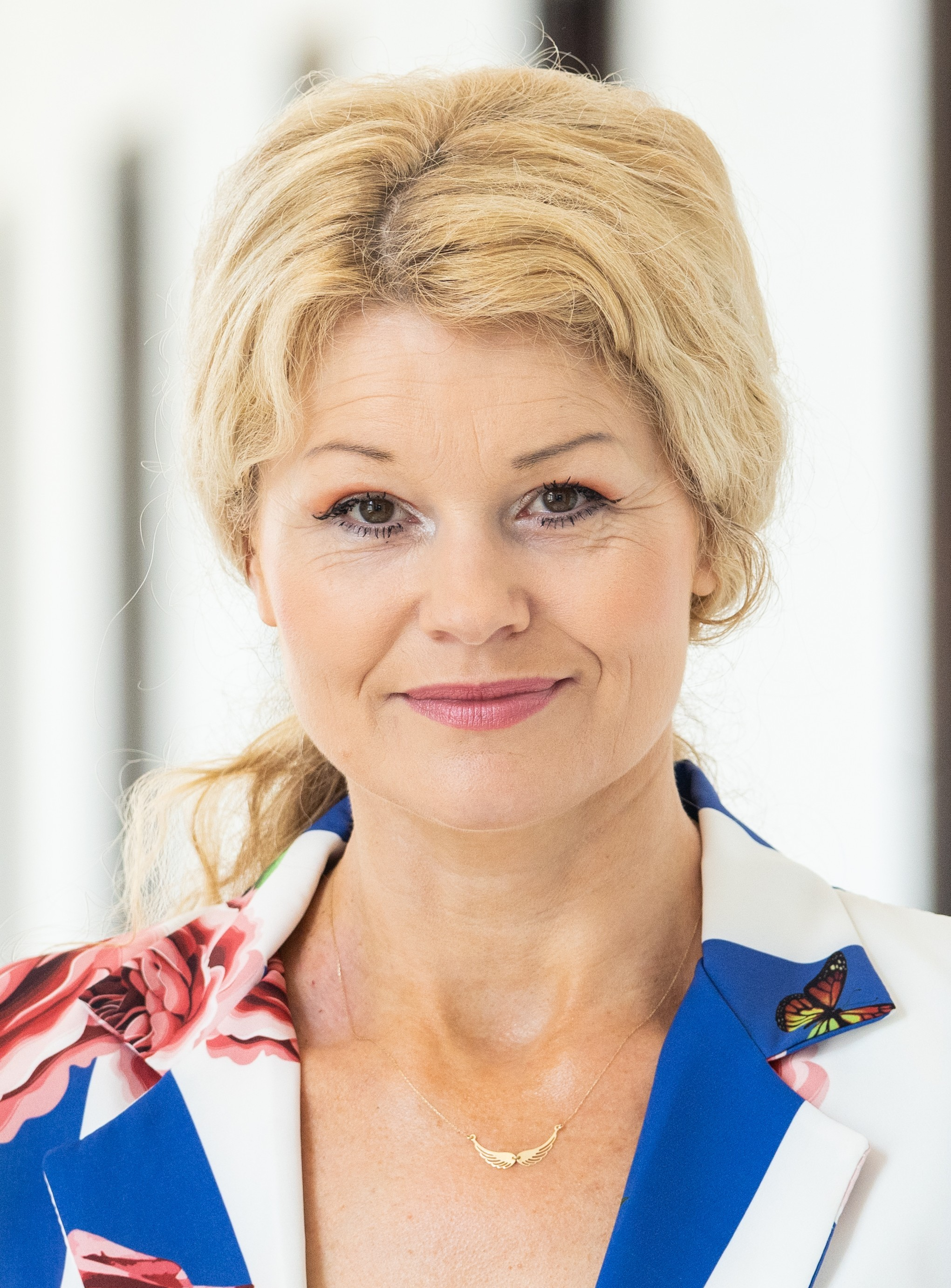

Member of the Sejm
- Incumbent
- Assumed office 12 November 2019
- Constituency: 36-Kalisz

Personal details
- Born: 25 June 1976 (age 50) Godziesze Wielkie, Poland
- Citizenship: Polish
- Party: Democratic Left Alliance (2004-2021); New Left (2021-2023); Independent (since 2023)
- Other political affiliations: Left and Democrats (2007-2009); The Left (2019-2023); Civic Coalition (since 2023)
- Children: 2
- Education: Adam Mickiewicz University in Poznań, Law, Law - Master (2000); University of Łódź, Management of Local Government Units (2001) - postgraduate studies Poznań University of Economics and Business, Real Estate Management (2006) - postgraduate studies.
- Profession: Attorney

Karolina Monika Pawliczak (born 25 June 1976) is a Polish lawyer and left wing politician. She was elected to the Sejm (9th term) representing the constituency of Kalisz in October 2019. She took her oath of office in November 2019.

== Biography ==
=== Early years ===
Pawliczak was born in the village of Godziesze Wielkie, in Kalisz County, Poland. She attended the Adam Mickiewicz University in Poznań, Law, Law - Master (2000), the University of Łódź, Management of Local Government Units (2001) - postgraduate studies, and the Poznań University of Economics and Business, Real Estate Management (2006) - postgraduate studies.

In 2002-06 and 2010-14 she was a Councilor of the Kalisz City Council. From 2014 to March 2018, she was the vice president of Kalisz, the first woman to hold the position.

=== Sejm ===
She has been a member of the Democratic Left Alliance/New Left. Pawliczak was elected to the Sejm (9th term) representing the constituency of Kalisz on 13 October 2019. She took her oath of office on 12 November 2019. In the Sejm, she works in two committees, Infrastructure and European Union affairs.

In July 2021, Pawliczak and five other New Left MPs had their rights as party members suspended by the head of the New Left, Włodzimierz Czarzasty, with whom they had disagreed. The suspended politicians sent a letter to Czarzasty in which they questioned the fact that certain political commitments were made on behalf of the party, and allowed their letter to be public. Czarzasty accused them of an action grossly violating the obligation to care for the good name of the party. Pawliczak said: "Democracy, not bullying; talking, not suspending and expelling from the party ... I want to continue building such a democratic party with my friends."

On November 11, 2021, on Poland's Independence Day, Polish far-right nationalists at a rally in Kalisz attended by hundreds of people yelled "Death to Jews." They then burned a red-covered book meant to symbolize the 1264 Statute of Kalisz historic pact protecting Poland's Jewish rights. Pawliczak posted a video of the event on Twitter, writing: "Where were the city authorities?" She said as well: "As Marian Turski used to say - "Do not be indifferent, Auschwitz has not fallen from heaven," and something terrible may happen if there is consent to this type of behavior." She criticized the Mayor of Kalisz, Krystian Kinastowski, saying he was guilty of neglect for not forbidding or dissolving the rally, and also criticized the slowness of the negative reaction of the national government, saying "It took four days? After four days, the president of the country reacted, and after five days the minister of internal affairs."

On June 7, 2023, Pawliczak left the New Left and became an independent.

== Personal life ==
Pawliczak is married, and has two children.
