= Takomyśle =

- Village
- Location within Poland
- Coordinates: 51°41′N 18°14′E
- Country: Poland
- Voivodeship: Greater Poland
- County: Kalisz
- Gmina: Godziesze Wielkie

Takomyśle [takɔˈmɨɕlɛ] is a village in the administrative district of Gmina Godziesze Wielkie, within Kalisz County, Greater Poland Voivodeship, in west-central Poland.
