= Wolica, Przeworsk County =

Wolica
- Village
- Location within Poland
- Coordinates: 50°2′N 22°25′E
- Country: Poland
- Voivodeship: Subcarpathian
- County: Przeworsk
- Gmina: Gać
- Population: 260

Wolica [vɔˈlʲit͡sa] is a village in the administrative district of Gmina Gać, within Przeworsk County, Subcarpathian Voivodeship, in south-eastern Poland.
