= Kakawa-Kolonia =

- Village
- Location within Poland
- Coordinates: 51°36′N 18°10′E
- Country: Poland
- Voivodeship: Greater Poland
- County: Kalisz
- Gmina: Godziesze Wielkie
- Population: 250

Kakawa-Kolonia [kaˈkava kɔˈlɔɲa] is a village in the administrative district of Gmina Godziesze Wielkie, within Kalisz County, Greater Poland Voivodeship, in west-central Poland.
