= Biała, Kalisz County =

Biała
- Village
- Location within Poland
- Coordinates: 51°37′26″N 18°9′45″E
- Country: Poland
- Voivodeship: Greater Poland
- County: Kalisz
- Gmina: Godziesze Wielkie

Biała [ˈbjawa] is a village in the administrative district of Gmina Godziesze Wielkie, within Kalisz County, Greater Poland Voivodeship, in west-central Poland.
