= Gmina Gać =

Gmina Gać Gać Commune
- Gmina
- Flag Coat of arms
- Interactive map of Gmina Gać
- Coordinates (Gać): 50°1′34″N 22°21′34″E
- Country: Poland
- Voivodeship: Subcarpathian
- County: Przeworsk
- Seat: Gać

Area
  - Total: 35.95 km^{2} (13.88 sq mi)

Population (2011)
  - Total: 4,648
  - Density: 129.3/km^{2} (334.9/sq mi)

Gmina Gać is a rural gmina (administrative district) in Przeworsk County, Subcarpathian Voivodeship, in south-eastern Poland. Its seat is the village of Gać, which lies approximately 12 kilometres (7 mi) south-west of Przeworsk and 26 km (16 mi) east of the regional capital Rzeszów.

The gmina covers an area of 35.95 square kilometres (13.9 sq mi), and in 2006, its total population was 4,562 (4,648 in 2011).

== Villages ==
Gmina Gać contains the villages and settlements of Białoboki, Dębów, Gać, Mikulice, Ostrów and Wolica.

== Neighbouring gminas ==
Gmina Gać is bordered by the gminas of Kańczuga, Łańcut, Markowa and Przeworsk.
