= Końska Wieś =

- Village
- Location within Poland
- Coordinates: 51°38′14″N 18°11′59″E
- Country: Poland
- Voivodeship: Greater Poland
- County: Kalisz
- Gmina: Godziesze Wielkie

Końska Wieś [ˈkɔɲska ˈvjɛɕ] is a village in the administrative district of Gmina Godziesze Wielkie, within Kalisz County, Greater Poland Voivodeship, in west-central Poland.
