= Kąpie, Greater Poland Voivodeship =

Kąpie
- Village
- Location within Poland
- Coordinates: 51°38′N 18°8′E
- Country: Poland
- Voivodeship: Greater Poland
- County: Kalisz
- Gmina: Godziesze Wielkie
- Population: 90

Kąpie (earlier Kopie) [ˈkɔmpjɛ] is a village in the administrative district of Gmina Godziesze Wielkie, within Kalisz County, Greater Poland Voivodeship, in west-central Poland.
