= Gmina Przeworsk =

Gmina Przeworsk Przeworsk Commune
- Gmina
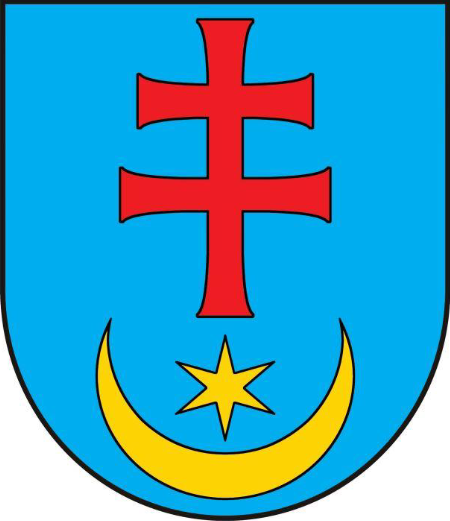
- Coat of arms
- Interactive map of Gmina Przeworsk
- Coordinates (Przeworsk): 50°4′N 22°30′E
- Country: Poland
- Voivodeship: Subcarpathian
- County: Przeworsk
- Seat: Przeworsk

Area
  - Total: 91 km^{2} (35 sq mi)

Population (2011)
  - Total: 14,791
  - Density: 160/km^{2} (420/sq mi)
- Website: http://www.przeworsk.ug.gov.pl/

Gmina Przeworsk is a rural gmina (administrative district) in Przeworsk County, Subcarpathian Voivodeship, in south-eastern Poland. Its seat is the town of Przeworsk, although the town is not part of the territory of the gmina.

The gmina covers an area of 91 square kilometres (35.1 sq mi), and as of 2006 its total population is 14,479 (14,791 in 2011).

== Villages ==
Gmina Przeworsk contains the villages and settlements of Chałupki, Gorliczyna, Gorliczyna-Szewnia, Grzęska, Gwizdaj, Mirocin, Nowosielce, Rozbórz, Studzian, Świętoniowa, Ujezna, Urzejowice and Wojciechówka.

== Neighbouring gminas ==
Gmina Przeworsk is bordered by the town of Przeworsk and by the gminas of Białobrzegi, Gać, Jarosław, Kańczuga, Łańcut, Pawłosiów, Tryńcza and Zarzecze.
