= Józefów, Gmina Godziesze Wielkie =

Józefów
- Village
- Location within Poland
- Coordinates: 51°40′29″N 18°07′52″E
- Country: Poland
- Voivodeship: Greater Poland
- County: Kalisz
- Gmina: Godziesze Wielkie

Józefów (Polish pronunciation: [juˈzɛfuf]) is a village in the administrative district of Gmina Godziesze Wielkie, within Kalisz County, Greater Poland Voivodeship, in west-central Poland.
