= Zajączki Bankowe =

- Village
- Location within Poland
- Coordinates: 51°39′35″N 18°14′29″E
- Country: Poland
- Voivodeship: Greater Poland
- County: Kalisz
- Gmina: Godziesze Wielkie

Zajączki Bankowe [zaˈjɔnt͡ʂki banˈkɔvɛ] is a village in the administrative district of Gmina Godziesze Wielkie, within Kalisz County, Greater Poland Voivodeship, in west-central Poland.
