= Żydów, Greater Poland Voivodeship =

Żydów
- Village
- Location within Poland
- Coordinates: 51°42′N 18°7′E
- Country: Poland
- Voivodeship: Greater Poland
- County: Kalisz
- Gmina: Godziesze Wielkie

Żydów [ˈʐɨduf] is a village in the administrative district of Gmina Godziesze Wielkie located within Kalisz County, Greater Poland Voivodeship in west-central Poland.
