= Bałdoń =

- Village
- Location within Poland
- Coordinates: 51°40′N 18°10′E
- Country: Poland
- Voivodeship: Greater Poland
- County: Kalisz
- Gmina: Godziesze Wielkie
- Population: 210

Bałdoń [ˈbau̯dɔɲ] is a village in the administrative district of Gmina Godziesze Wielkie in Kalisz County, Greater Poland Voivodeship, in west-central Poland.
