= Nowa Kakawa =

- Village
- Location within Poland
- Coordinates: 51°35′56″N 18°08′06″E
- Country: Poland
- Voivodeship: Greater Poland
- County: Kalisz
- Gmina: Godziesze Wielkie

Nowa Kakawa [ˈnɔva kaˈkava] is a village in the administrative district of Gmina Godziesze Wielkie, within Kalisz County, Greater Poland Voivodeship, in west-central Poland.
