= Godzieszki =

- Village
- Location within Poland
- Coordinates: 51°39′N 18°12′E
- Country: Poland
- Voivodeship: Greater Poland
- County: Kalisz
- Gmina: Godziesze Wielkie

Godzieszki [ɡɔˈd͡ʑɛʂki] is a village in the administrative district of Gmina Godziesze Wielkie, within Kalisz County, Greater Poland Voivodeship, in west-central Poland.
