= Borek, Gmina Godziesze Wielkie =

Borek
- Village
- Location within Poland
- Coordinates: 51°41′58″N 18°8′11″E
- Country: Poland
- Voivodeship: Greater Poland
- County: Kalisz
- Gmina: Godziesze Wielkie

Borek [ˈbɔrɛk] is a village in the administrative district of Gmina Godziesze Wielkie, within Kalisz County, Greater Poland Voivodeship, in west-central Poland.
