= Adamówka, Podkarpackie Voivodeship =

Adamówka
- Village
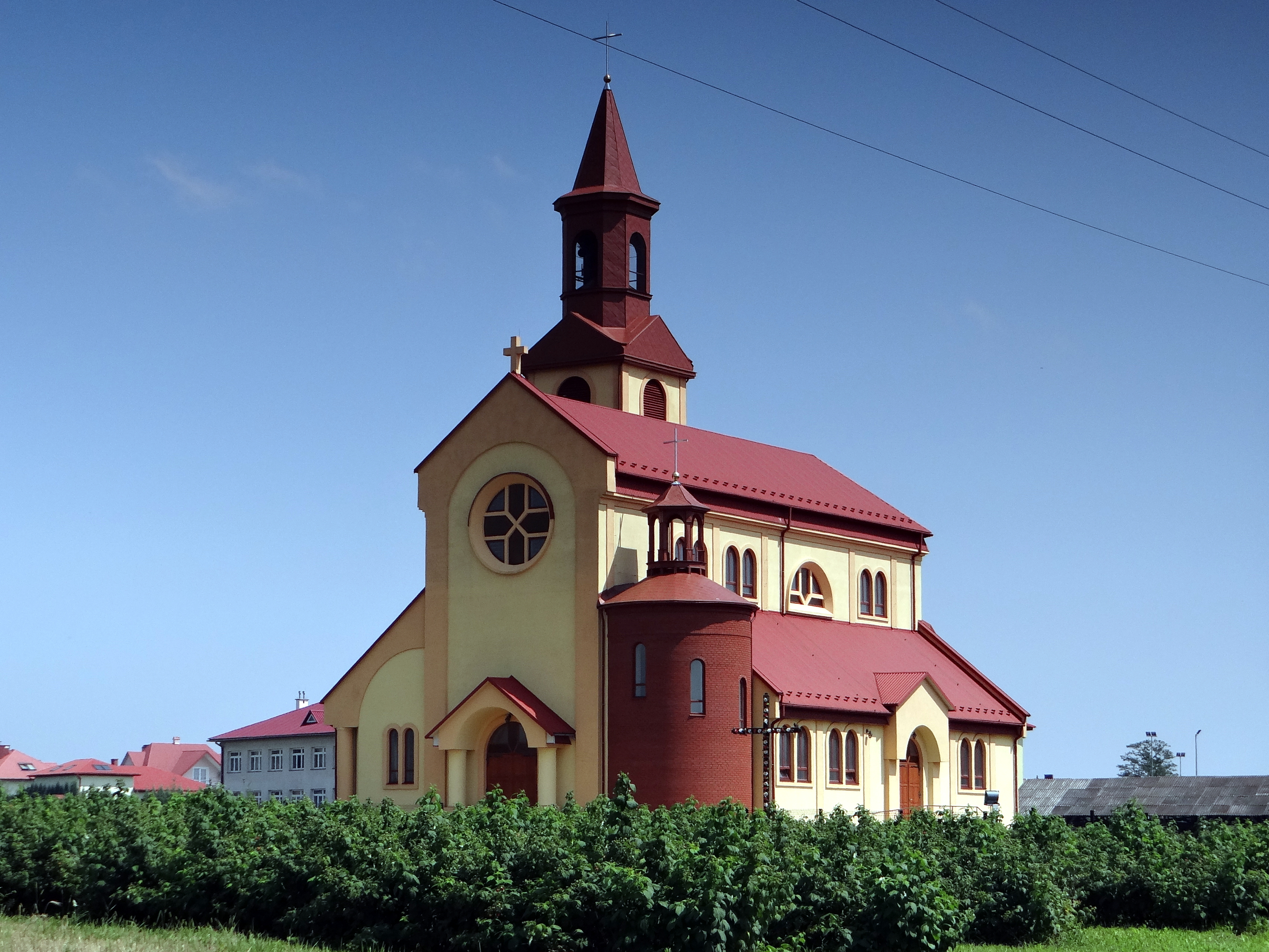
- Church of Our Lady

- Location within Poland
- Coordinates: 50°15′32″N 22°41′42″E
- Country: Poland
- Voivodeship: Subcarpathian
- County: Przeworsk
- Gmina: Adamówka

Population
  - Total: 1,205

Adamówka [adaˈmufka] is a village in Przeworsk County, Subcarpathian Voivodeship, in south-eastern Poland. It is the seat of the gmina (administrative district) called Gmina Adamówka.
