= Paluchy =

- Village
- Location within Poland
- Coordinates: 50°13′13″N 22°35′01″E
- Country: Poland
- Voivodeship: Podkarpackie
- County: Przeworsk
- Gmina: Sieniawa
- Population: 150

Paluchy [paˈluxɨ] is a village in the administrative district of Gmina Sieniawa, within Przeworsk County, Podkarpackie Voivodeship, in south-eastern Poland.
