= Wola Droszewska =

- Village
- Location within Poland
- Coordinates: 51°37′N 18°7′E
- Country: Poland
- Voivodeship: Greater Poland
- County: Kalisz
- Gmina: Godziesze Wielkie

Wola Droszewska [ˈvɔla drɔˈʂɛfska] is a village in the administrative district of Gmina Godziesze Wielkie, within Kalisz County, Greater Poland Voivodeship, in west-central Poland.
