= Stobno, Kalisz County =

Stobno
- Village
- Location within Poland
- Coordinates: 51°40′N 18°9′E
- Country: Poland
- Voivodeship: Greater Poland
- County: Kalisz
- Gmina: Godziesze Wielkie

Stobno [ˈstɔbnɔ] is a village in the administrative district of Gmina Godziesze Wielkie, within Kalisz County, Greater Poland Voivodeship, in west-central Poland.
