= Nowosielce, Przeworsk County =

Nowosielce
- Village
- Location within Poland
- Coordinates: 50°3′30″N 22°23′53″E
- Country: Poland
- Voivodeship: Subcarpathian
- County: Przeworsk
- Gmina: Przeworsk
- Elevation: 200 m (660 ft)
- Population: 1,600

Nowosielce [nɔvɔˈɕɛlt͡sɛ] is a village in the administrative district of Gmina Przeworsk, within Przeworsk County, Subcarpathian Voivodeship, in south-eastern Poland.
