= Gmina Adamówka =

Gmina Adamówka Adamówka Commune
- Gmina
- Interactive map of Gmina Adamówka
- Coordinates (Adamówka): 50°15′32″N 22°41′42″E
- Country: Poland
- Voivodeship: Subcarpathian
- County: Przeworsk
- Seat: Adamówka

Area
  - Total: 134.27 km^{2} (51.84 sq mi)

Population (2011)
  - Total: 4,198
  - Density: 31.27/km^{2} (80.98/sq mi)
- Website: http://www.adamowka.pl/gmina/

Gmina Adamówka is a rural gmina (administrative district) in Przeworsk County, Subcarpathian Voivodeship, in south-eastern Poland. Its seat is the village of Adamówka, which lies approximately 26 kilometres (16 mi) north-east of Przeworsk and 56 km (35 mi) north-east of the regional capital Rzeszów.

The gmina covers an area of 134.27 square kilometres (51.8 sq mi), and as of 2006 its total population is 4,208 (4,198 in 2011).

== Neighbouring gminas ==
Gmina Adamówka is bordered by the gminas of Kuryłówka, Leżajsk, Sieniawa, Stary Dzików, Tarnogród and Wiązownica.

== Villages ==
The gmina contains the following villages having the status of sołectwo: Adamówka, Cieplice, Dobcza, Krasne, Majdan Sieniawski and Pawłowa.
