= Urzejowice =

- Village
- Location within Poland
- Coordinates: 50°1′N 22°28′E
- Country: Poland
- Voivodeship: Subcarpathian
- County: Przeworsk
- Gmina: Przeworsk
- Population: 1,800

Urzejowice [uʐɛjɔˈvʲit͡sɛ] is a village in the administrative district of Gmina Przeworsk, within Przeworsk County, Subcarpathian Voivodeship, in south-eastern Poland.

== See also ==
- Walddeutsche
