= Wolica, Greater Poland Voivodeship =

Wolica
- Village
- Location within Poland
- Coordinates: 51°42′28″N 18°8′39″E
- Country: Poland
- Voivodeship: Greater Poland
- County: Kalisz
- Gmina: Godziesze Wielkie

Population
  - Total: 820
- Postal code: 62-872
- Vehicle registration: PKL

Wolica [vɔˈlit͡sa] is a village in the administrative district of Gmina Godziesze Wielkie, within Kalisz County, Greater Poland Voivodeship, in central Poland.

In 2005 the village had a population of 820.

== History ==
Following the German-Soviet invasion of Poland, which started World War II in September 1939, the village was occupied by Germany until 1945. On 7 June 1941, the Germans carried out a public execution of 22 Poles in the village.
