= Kańczuga =

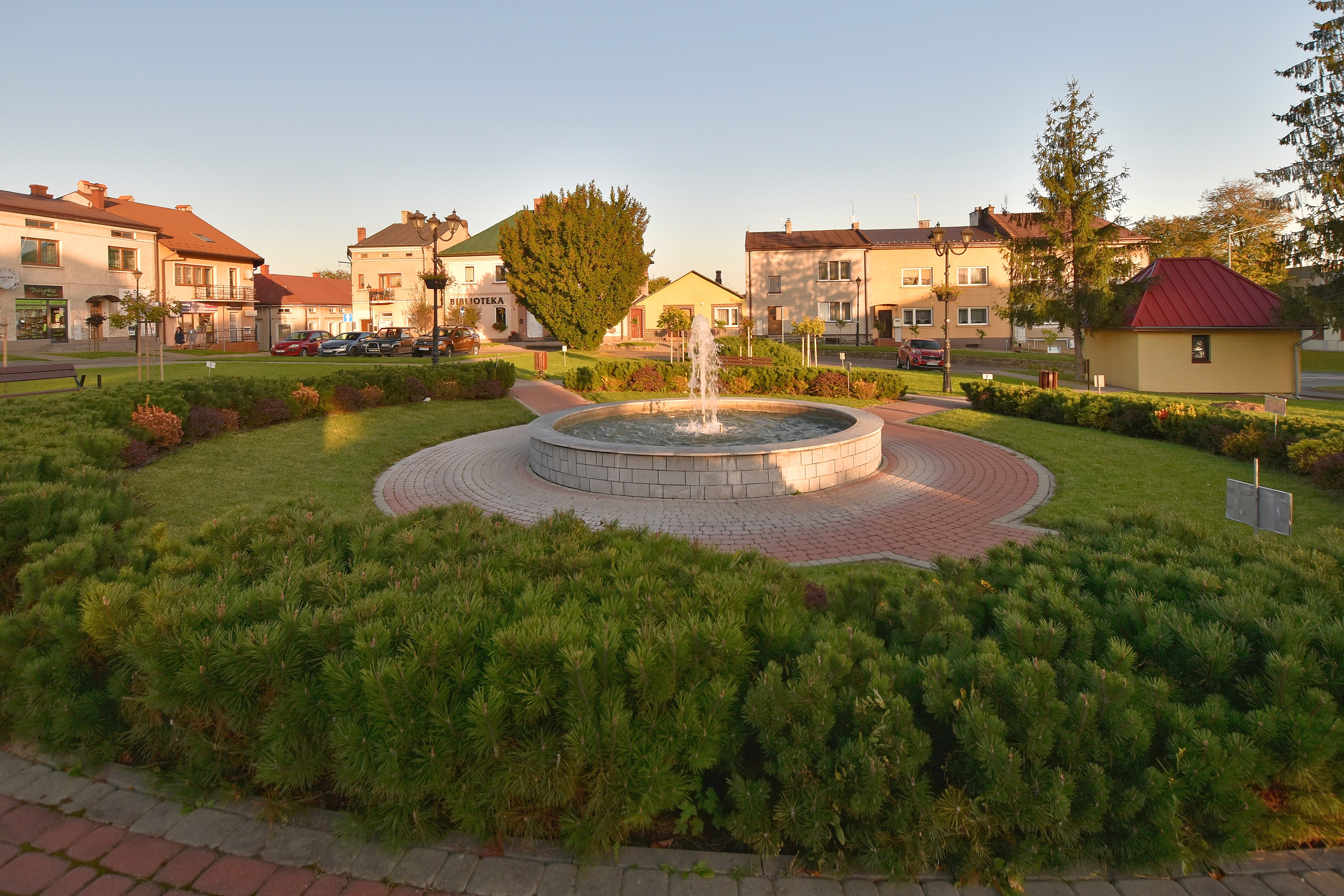
- Square in the town center

- Coat of arms

- Location within Poland
- Coordinates: 50°0′N 22°24′E
- Country: Poland
- Voivodeship: Subcarpathian
- County: Przeworsk
- Gmina: Kańczuga

Government
  - Mayor: Andrzej Żygadło (Ind.)

Area
  - Total: 7.61 km^{2} (2.94 sq mi)
- Elevation: 220 m (720 ft)

Population (2006)
  - Total: 3,211
  - Density: 422/km^{2} (1,090/sq mi)
- Time zone: UTC+1 (CET)
  - Summer (DST): UTC+2 (CEST)
- Postal code: 37-220
- Car plates: RPZ
- Website: http://www.kanczuga.pl

Kańczuga (Polish: [kaj̃ˈt͡ʂuɡa]) is a town in Przeworsk County, Subcarpathian Voivodeship, in south-eastern Poland, with a population of 3,187 inhabitants on 2 June 2009. The town was an early centre of the Polish automobile industry. Buses based on Fiat 621R and used in Kraków had bodywork fitted in Kańczuga. Today, the town is known for the restoration of old SAABs.

== History ==
Kańczuga was first mentioned in documents from 1340, when it was part of Red Ruthenia. At that time, the village belonged to the noble Pilecki family. In the second half of the 14th century, Elżbieta Pilecka, the daughter of Kańczuga's founder Otton of Pilcza, married a nobleman from Greater Poland, Wincenty Granowski, and after his death, she married King Władysław II Jagiełło.

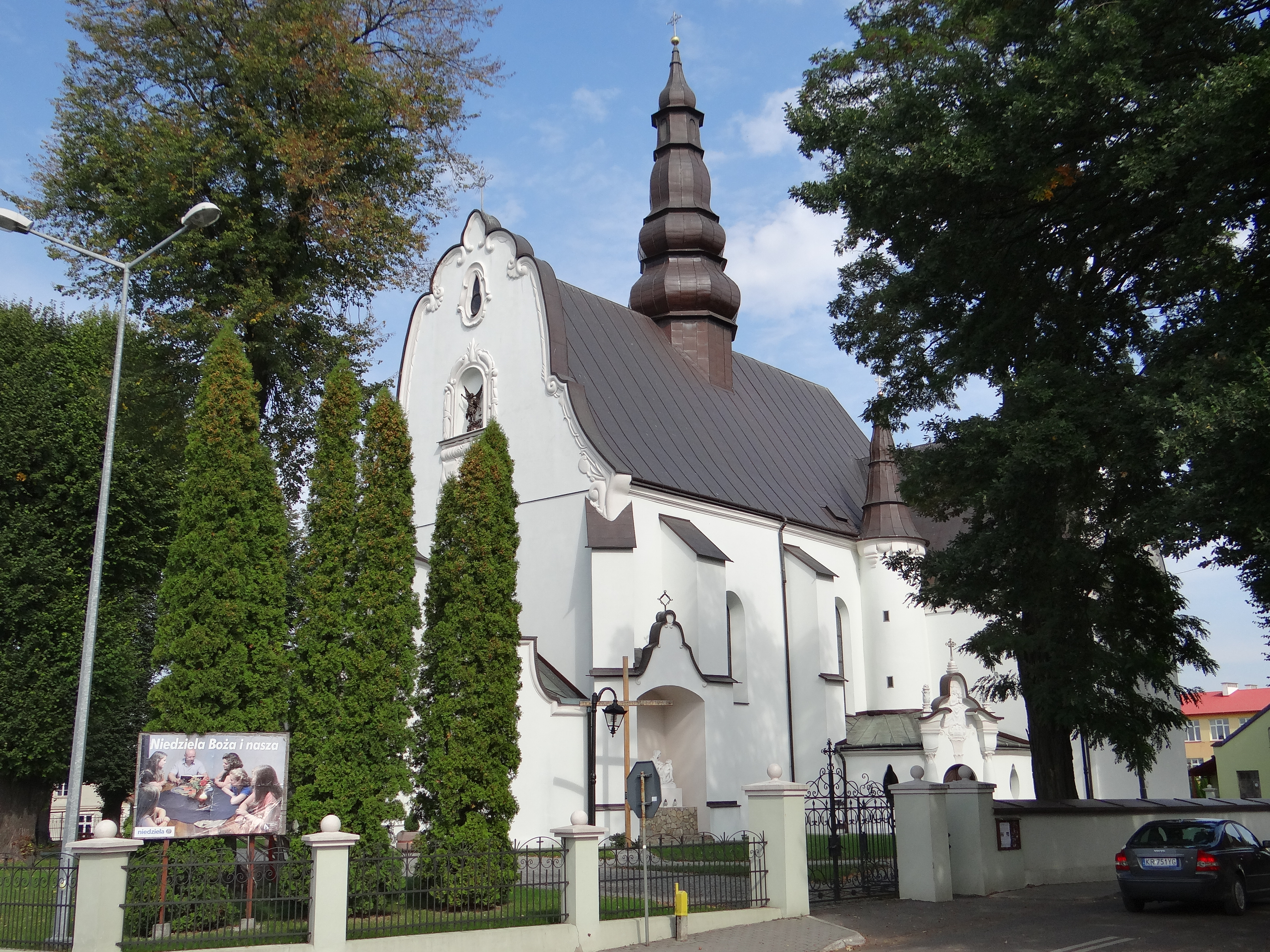
Renaissance Saint Michael Archangel church

In 1440, Kańczuga received town charter. As a private town it remained in the hands of the Pilecki family, but in the subsequent centuries, Kańczuga was property of such families, as Odrowaz, Kostka, Ostrogski, Lubomirski and Sanguszko. The town, with its deep tunnels used as merchant goods storages, prospered until the late 15th century, when its population reached 3000. In 1498, Kańczuga was burned to the ground in a Wallachian raid, which ended the period of prosperity. In the 16th and early 17th centuries, the area of Kańczuga was frequently raided by the Crimean Tatars. In a 1624 raid, all local villages were burned, and thousands of residents kidnapped.

As a result of the first of Partitions of Poland (Treaty of St-Petersburg dated 5 July 1772), Kańczuga was attributed to the Habsburg monarchy as part of Austrian Galicia, in which it remained until 1918. When a post office was opened in 1870, the town was in the Przeworsk Bezirkshauptmannschaft.

Before the Holocaust the Kańczuga population was 3,000 with at least 40% being Jews.

Following the German-Soviet invasion of Poland, which started World War II in September 1939, the town was occupied by Germany until 1944. On August 8, 1942, the Jews living in the town were murdered by the Nazis and their bodies were dumped in a mass grave. Jewish civilians were first rounded up into the synagogue where they were forced to spend several days without food, water, or bathrooms. They were then taken out of the synagogue where the men were made to dig large holes which were used as their communal graves. After the holes were dug, the men, women, and children were shot, with their bodies being tossed into these mass, communal graves.

In April 1945, a pogrom took place in Kánczuga that targeted the few returning Holocaust survivors who gathered for a Passover Seder. During the Seder, 12 were killed by ethnic Polish perpetrators.
