= Sośnica, Podkarpackie Voivodeship =

Sośnica
- Village
- Location within Poland
- Coordinates: 49°54′01″N 22°52′30″E
- Country: Poland
- Voivodeship: Podkarpackie
- County: Jarosław
- Gmina: Radymno

Sośnica [sɔɕˈɲit͡sa] is a village in the administrative district of Gmina Radymno, within Jarosław County, Podkarpackie Voivodeship, in south-eastern Poland, close to the border with .
