= Gać, Podkarpackie Voivodeship =

Gać
- Village
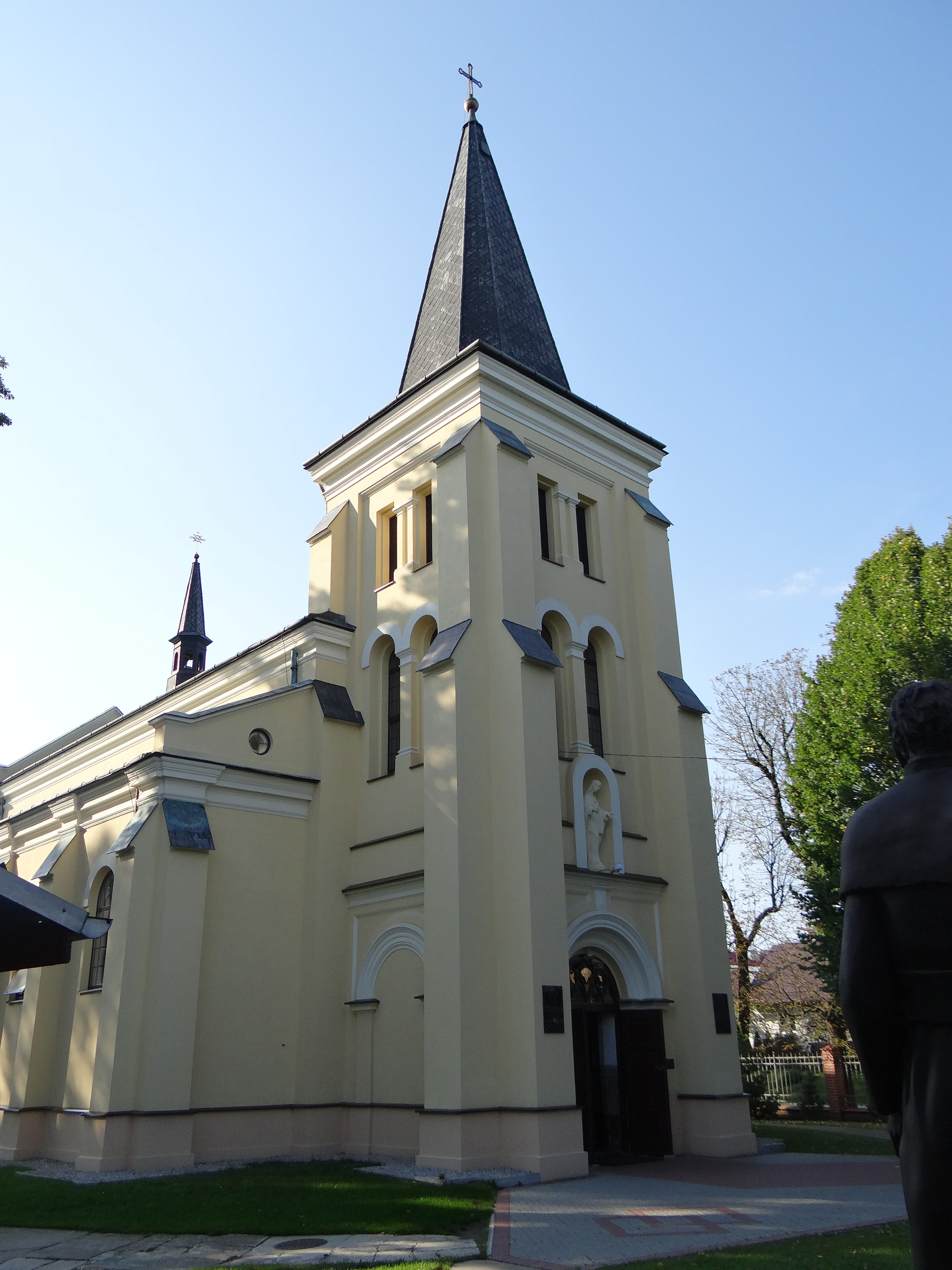
- Assumption of Our Virgin Mary Church

- Location within Poland
- Coordinates: 50°1′34″N 22°21′34″E
- Country: Poland
- Voivodeship: Subcarpathian
- County: Przeworsk
- Gmina: Gać
- Elevation: 207 m (679 ft)

Population
  - Total: 1,550
- Time zone: UTC+1 (CET)
  - Summer (DST): UTC+2 (CEST)
- Postal code: 37-207
- Vehicle registration: RPZ

Gać (Polish pronunciation: [ɡat͡ɕ]) is a village in Przeworsk County, Subcarpathian Voivodeship, in south-eastern Poland. It is the seat of the gmina (administrative district) called Gmina Gać.
