= Przeworsk County =

Przeworsk County Powiat przeworski
- County
- Flag Coat of arms

- Location within the voivodeship
- Coordinates (Przeworsk): 50°4′N 22°30′E
- Country: Poland
- Voivodeship: Subcarpathian
- Seat: Przeworsk
- Gminas: Total 9 (incl. 1 urban): Przeworsk; Gmina Adamówka; Gmina Gać; Gmina Jawornik Polski; Gmina Kańczuga; Gmina Przeworsk; Gmina Sieniawa; Gmina Tryńcza; Gmina Zarzecze

Area
  - Total: 698.35 km^{2} (269.63 sq mi)

Population (2019)
  - Total: 78,354
  - Density: 112.20/km^{2} (290.59/sq mi)
  - Urban: 20,663
  - Rural: 57,691
- Car plates: RPZ
- Website: www.powiat.przeworsk.pl

Przeworsk County (Polish: powiat przeworski) is a unit of territorial administration and local government (powiat) in Subcarpathian Voivodeship, south-eastern Poland. It came into being on January 1, 1999, as a result of the Polish local government reforms passed in 1998. Its administrative seat and largest town is Przeworsk, which lies 36 kilometres (22 mi) east of the regional capital Rzeszów. The county also contains the towns of Kańczuga, lying 11 km (7 mi) south-west of Przeworsk, and Sieniawa, 15 km (9 mi) north-east of Przeworsk.

The county covers an area of 698.35 square kilometres (269.6 sq mi). As of 2019 its total population is 78,354, out of which the population of Przeworsk is 15,356, that of Kańczuga is 3,167, that of Sieniawa is 2,140, and the rural population is 57,691.

== Neighbouring counties ==
Przeworsk County is bordered by Biłgoraj County to the north, Lubaczów County and Jarosław County to the east, Przemyśl County to the south, Rzeszów County to the south-west, and Łańcut County and Leżajsk County to the west.

== Administrative divisions ==
The county is subdivided into nine gminas (one urban, two urban-rural and six rural). These are listed in the following table, in descending order of population.

Gmina	Type	Area (km^{2})	Population (2019)	Seat
Przeworsk	urban	22.0	15,356	
Gmina Przeworsk	rural	91.0	14,878	Przeworsk *
Gmina Kańczuga	urban-rural	105.2	12,329	Kańczuga
Gmina Tryńcza	rural	70.6	8,472	Tryńcza
Gmina Zarzecze	rural	49.2	7,201	Zarzecze
Gmina Sieniawa	urban-rural	127.3	7,005	Sieniawa
Gmina Jawornik Polski	rural	62.9	4,444	Jawornik Polski
Gmina Gać	rural	36.0	4,608	Gać
Gmina Adamówka	rural	134.3	4,061	Adamówka
* seat not part of the gmina
