= Dzieduszycki Palace =

Coordinates: 49.9849°N 22.5411°E

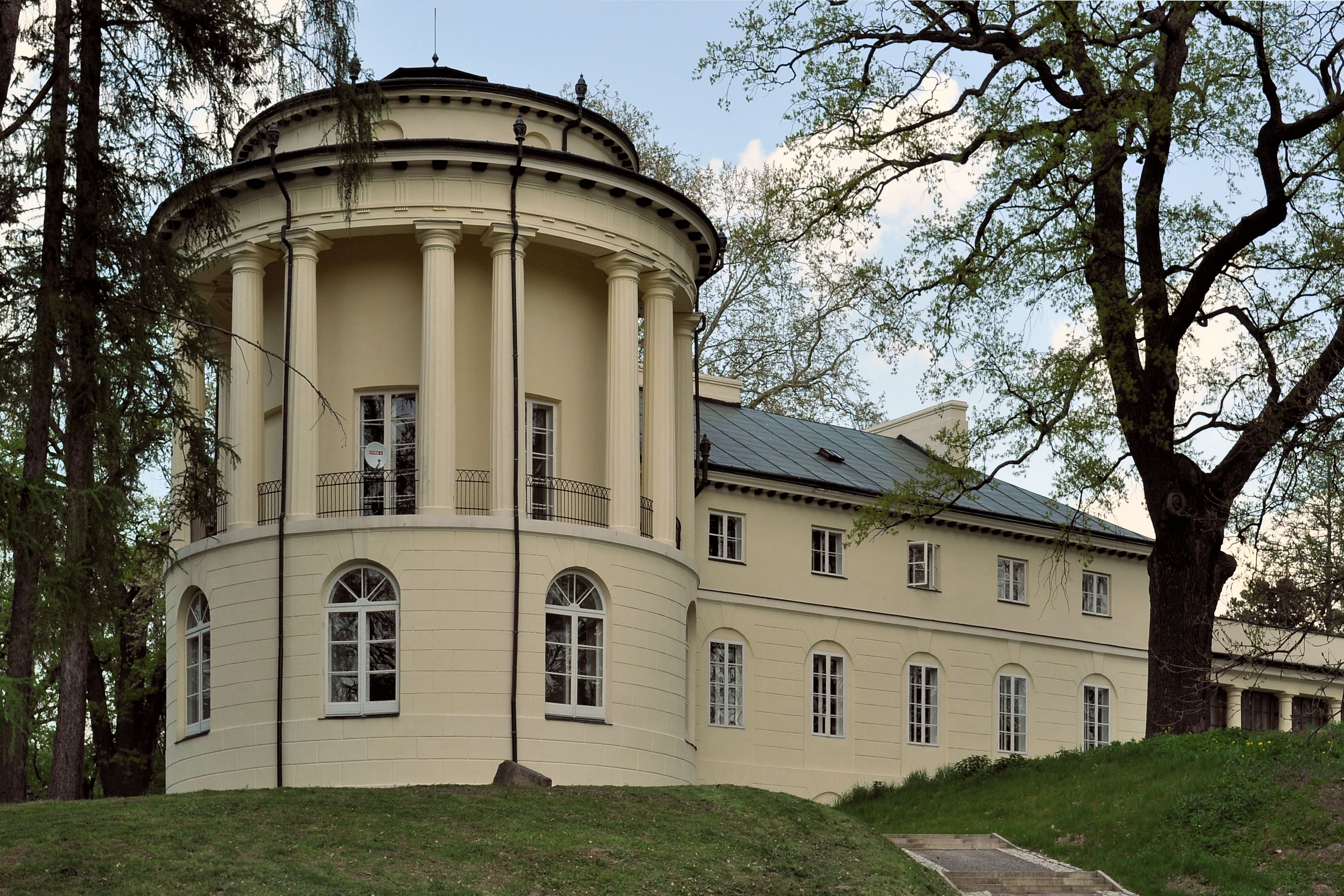
- Palace at Zarsecze
- Interactive map of Dzieduszycki Palace
- Location: Zarzecze, Poland
- Designer: Magdalena Morska

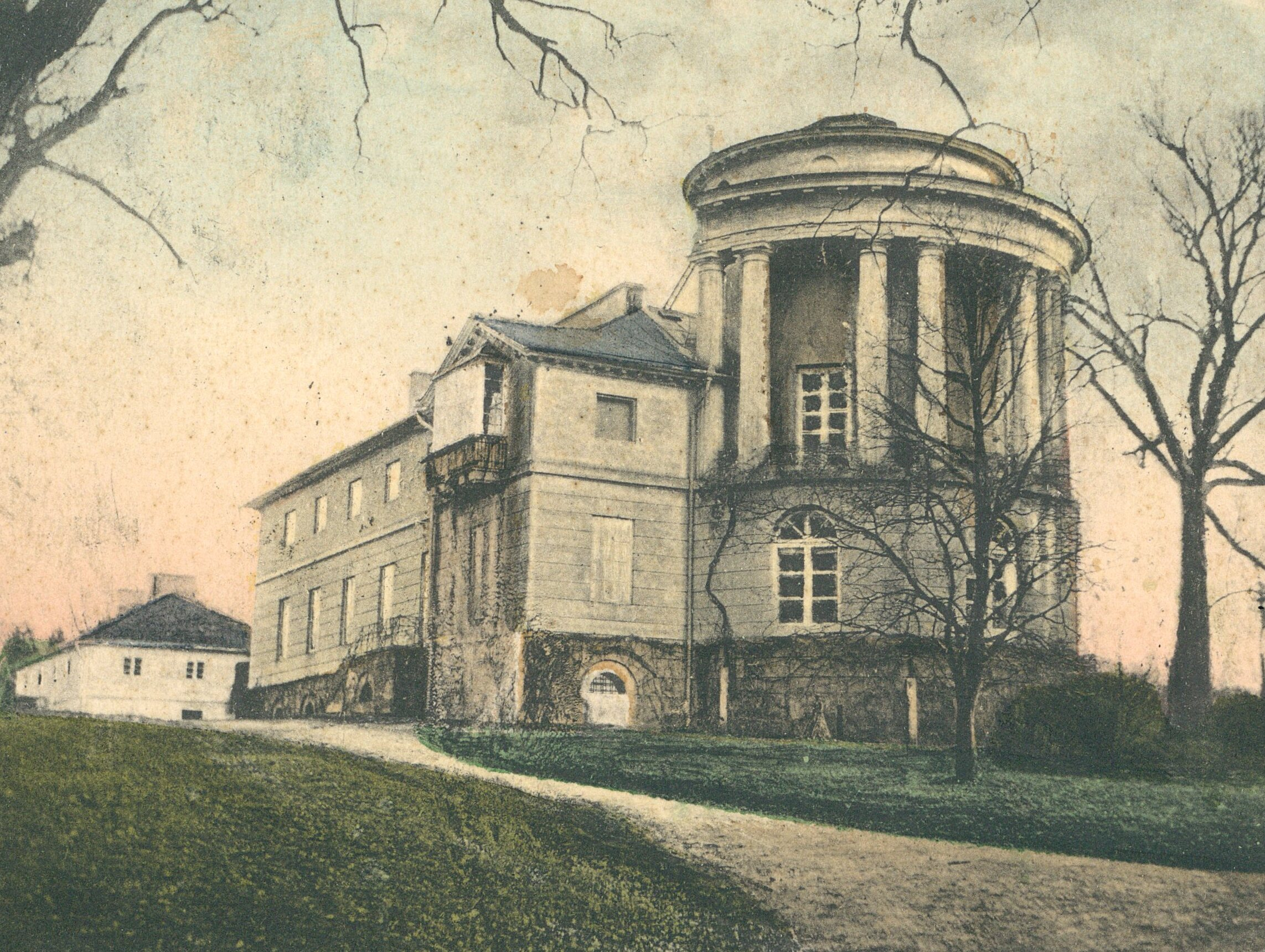
View of the palace ca 1908

Dzieduszycki Palace is a palace situated in Zarzecze in southern Poland. The palace is characterized by rich ornamental decorations, a reference to the art of the Greeks and Romans. The building was founded by Magdalena Morska of the Dzieduszycki family, built in the years 1798–1812.

== History ==
Magdalena Morska initiated a new period in the history of Zarzecze. After visiting France, England, Italy, Germany, Switzerland, Austria, Hungary, but primarily the Netherlands, Magdalena Morska had the opportunity to learn about other cultures coming from all over the world in the two largest royal ports, namely Amsterdam and Rotterdam. Mrs Morska was charmed by the environment (especially trees) in Zarzecze and indeed wanted to build a rural residence there. Thanks to this new experience, gained over the North Sea, Magdalena organized the reconstruction of manor house in Zarzecze and its immediate surroundings, in part by changing the spatial layout of the village. After completing the project by Fryderyk Bauman and Christian Peter Aygnera - the creator of one of the wings of the National Theatre, it was created the palace in the Empire style to which Mrs Morska designed the interior herself and brought exotic flowers, shrubs, vines and trees to decorate the park in the romantic style. Mrs Magdalena also reinvented the oxbow lake Mleczka transforming by building an artificial island, thus increasing the aesthetic value of the palace complex.

After the death of Magdalena Morska (who died without any heirs), Zarzecze was passed to her relatives – the Dzieduszycki family. The property belonged to the family until 1944, but in that year under the decree on that land, the Dzieduszycki family was deprived of their possessions and thrown out of the property. In the 80's, the decaying palace complex was renovated. In 2007, Związek Rodowy Dzieduszyckich signed an agreement with the local authorities and began the creation of the Dzieduszycki Museum within the palace. The family signed a notary deed which waived rights and claims to the palace and park complex in favor of the emerging institution.

== Interior of the palace ==
Three rooms on the first floor were restored to the original design from the early nineteenth century. The particular rooms resemble the history of the palace and of the former owners. In the corridor there is a collection of drawings depicting the appearance of the palace from the early 19th century and gallery of the members of the family. There is a room with temporary exhibitions, geological room in which there is a family tree and photographs of old ancestral headquarters, archives and publications on the palace and its former inhabitants. Visitors are particularly impressed by the ballroom in the rotunda. It is a room with incredible furniture and fixtures and the original parquet floor is made of several types of wood. One room is devoted to the first entailer, Włodzimierz Dzieduszycki. His descendants are presented in “gallery hall” on the first floor. The portraits of the representatives of three families: Czartoryski, the Sapieha and Szeptycki families, which are related to the Dzieduszyccy, and are presented on the ground floor. The co-funders of the museum, which opened on 26 April 2008, are the authorities of the Zarzecze Commune.
