= Dzieduszycki (Sas) =

Ruthenian and Polish noble family

- Sas coat of arms

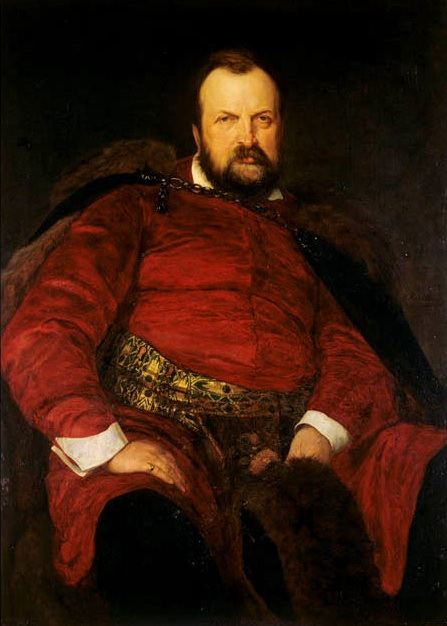
Włodzimierz Dzieduszycki, by Henryk Rodakowski

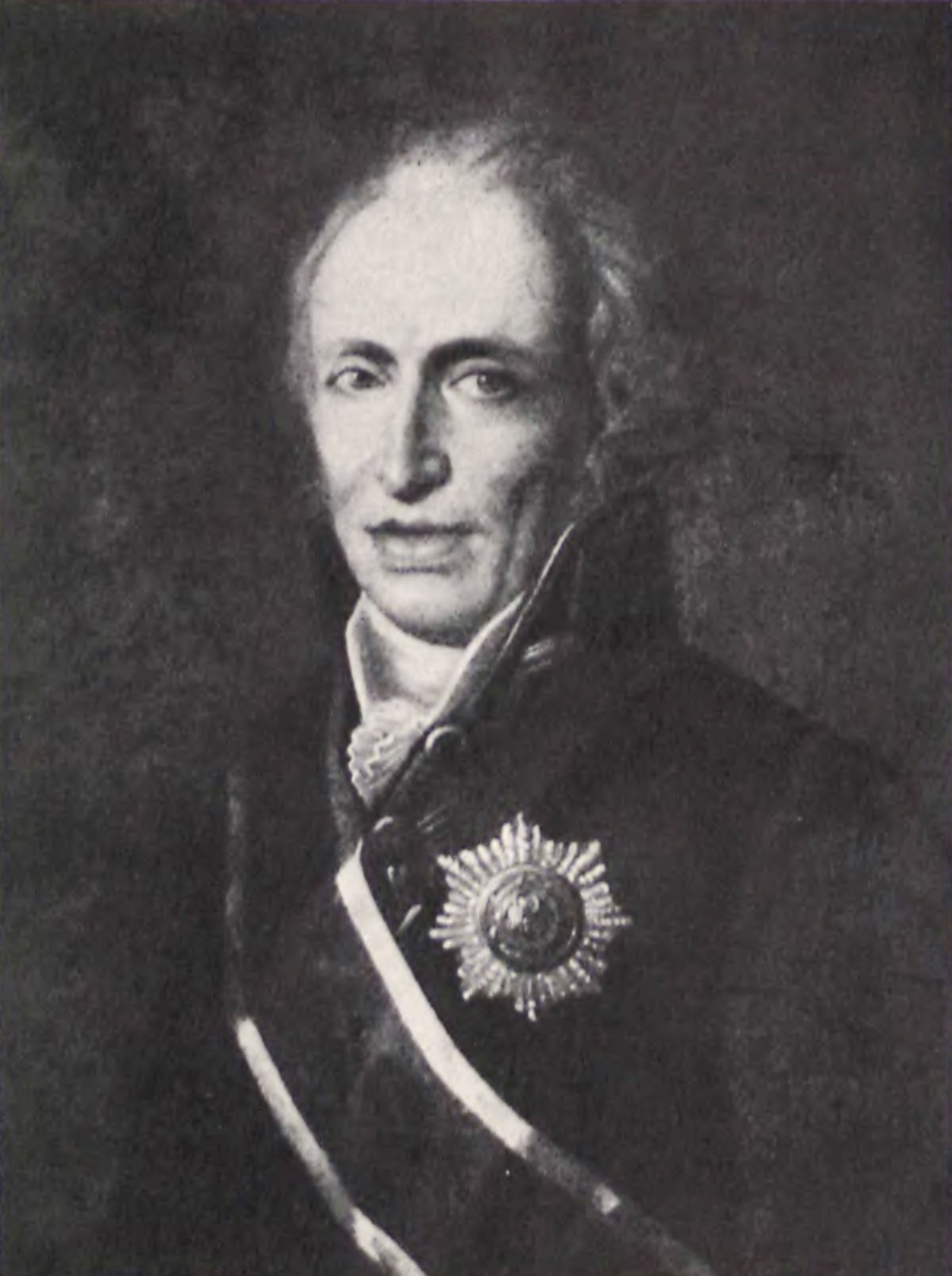
Walerian Dzieduszycki

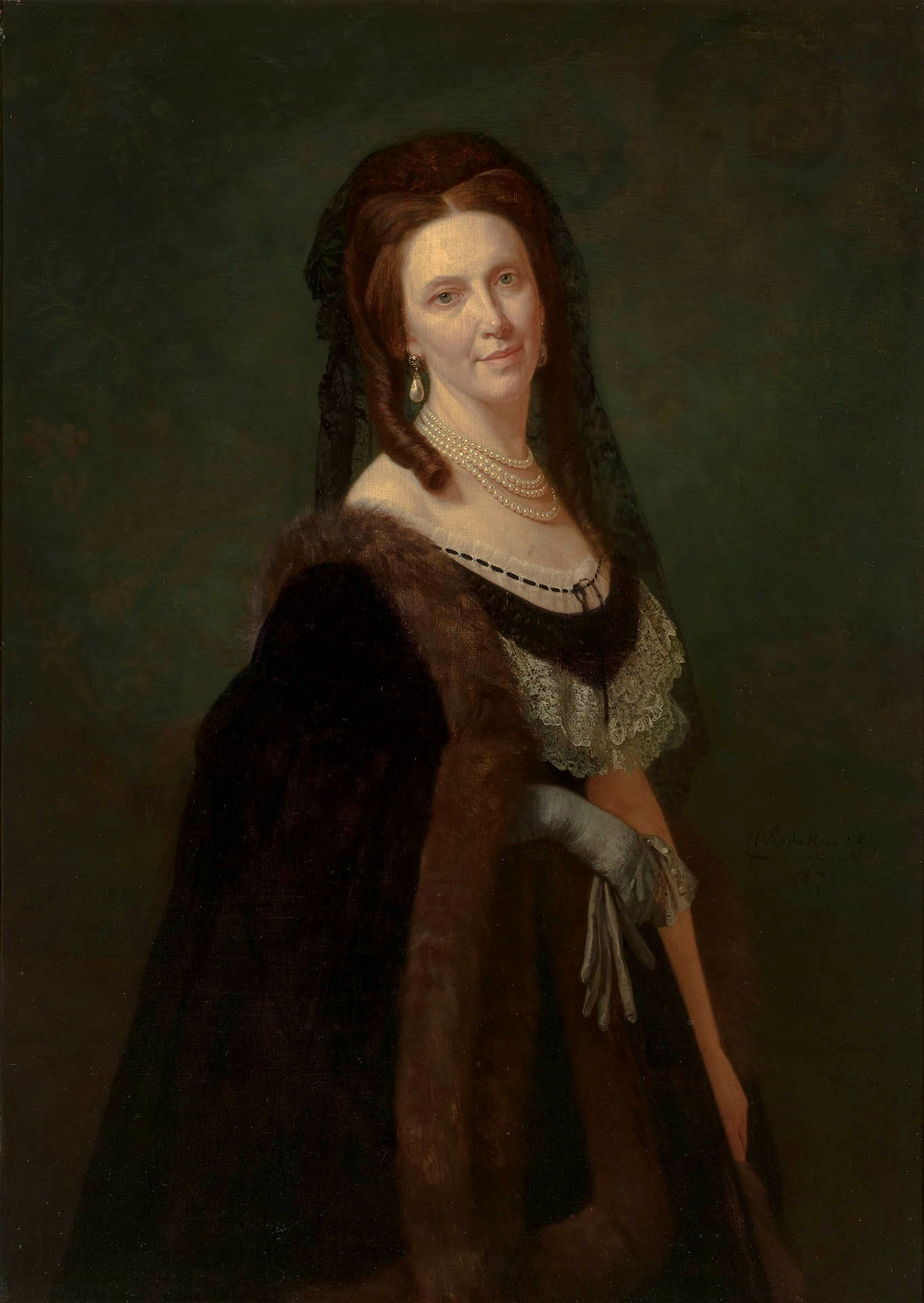
Zofia Dzieduszycka, by Henryk Rodakowski

The House of Dzieduszycki (plural: Dzieduszyccy, feminine form: Dzieduszycka) is an old Ruthenian and later Polish noble family first recorded in 1400. Members of the family held the title of Count, awarded to them on 22 October 1776. The title was heritable by all legitimate male-line descendants.

== History ==
The family originated in Ruthenian domain of the Polish Crown, which in 1434 was absorbed into Kingdom of Poland as Ruthenian Voivodeship. Progenitor of the family was Ivan (Ivashko) Didushytsky, who was first mentioned in 1411 as Iwasko Dzyadoschiczki in a charter from prince Fedir Liubartovych.

Didushytsky originally were Ruthenian boyars of Orthodox faith, but starting from 17th century they had converted into Greek Catholicism and later with the subsequent Polonization into Roman Catholicism. Their ancestral estate was Didushychi (now Velyki Didushychi in Lviv Oblast, Ukraine).

== Notable members ==
- Anastazja Dzieduszycka – (1842–1890), columnist
- Paulina Dzieduszycka – (1831–1892), writer
- Talia Dzieduszycka – (1811–1855), poet
- Aleksander Stanisław Dzieduszycki – (1813–1879), politician in Galicia
- Antoni Bazyli Dzieduszycki – (1757–1817), politician
- Franciszek Jan Dzieduszycki – (died 1714), Voivode of Podole
- Henryk Dzieduszycki – (1795–1845), landowner, industrialist
- Izydor Dzieduszycki – (1842–1888), historical and political writer
- Jerzy Dzieduszycki – (1575–1641), castellan of Lubaczów
- Jerzy Stanisław Dzieduszycki – (1670–1730), Great Crown Koniuszy
- Józef Kalasanty Dzieduszycki - (1772–1847), founder of the Poturzycki Library
- Juliusz Dzieduszycki – (1817–1885), landowner
- Juliusz Dzieduszycki – (1882–1942), politician and diplomate
- Karol Dzieduszycki – (1847–1902), landowner, politician in Galicia
- Kazimierz Adam Dzieduszycki – (1812–1885), deputy of the Sejm Krajowy
- Konstanty Dzieduszycki – (1884–1964), deputy of the Sejm and senator in the Second Republic of Poland
- Maurycy Dzieduszycki – (1813–1877), historian, journalist
- Mieczysław Antoni Dzieduszycki – (1823–1872), social activist
- Mikołaj Adam Dzieduszycki – (1769–1795), publicist
- Tadeusz Dzieduszycki – (1724–1777), Great Cześnik of the Crown
- Tadeusz Dzieduszycki – (1841–1918) deputy of the Sejm of the Land
- Tytus Dzieduszycki – (1796–1870) politician in Galicia
- Walerian Dzieduszycki – (1754–1832), patriotic activist, landowner
- Władysław Dzieduszycki – (1821–1868), deputy of the Sejm, horse breeder
- Włodzimierz Dzieduszycki – (1825–1899), naturalist
- Włodzimierz Dzieduszycki – (1885–1971), last Ordynat of the Poturzyce Fee Tail
- Wojciech Dzieduszycki – (1848–1909), politician, philosopher, essayist
- Wojciech Dzieduszycki – (1912–2008), artist
- Piotr Dzieduszycki – (1946-2014), sociologist and journalist, social activist

== Residences ==
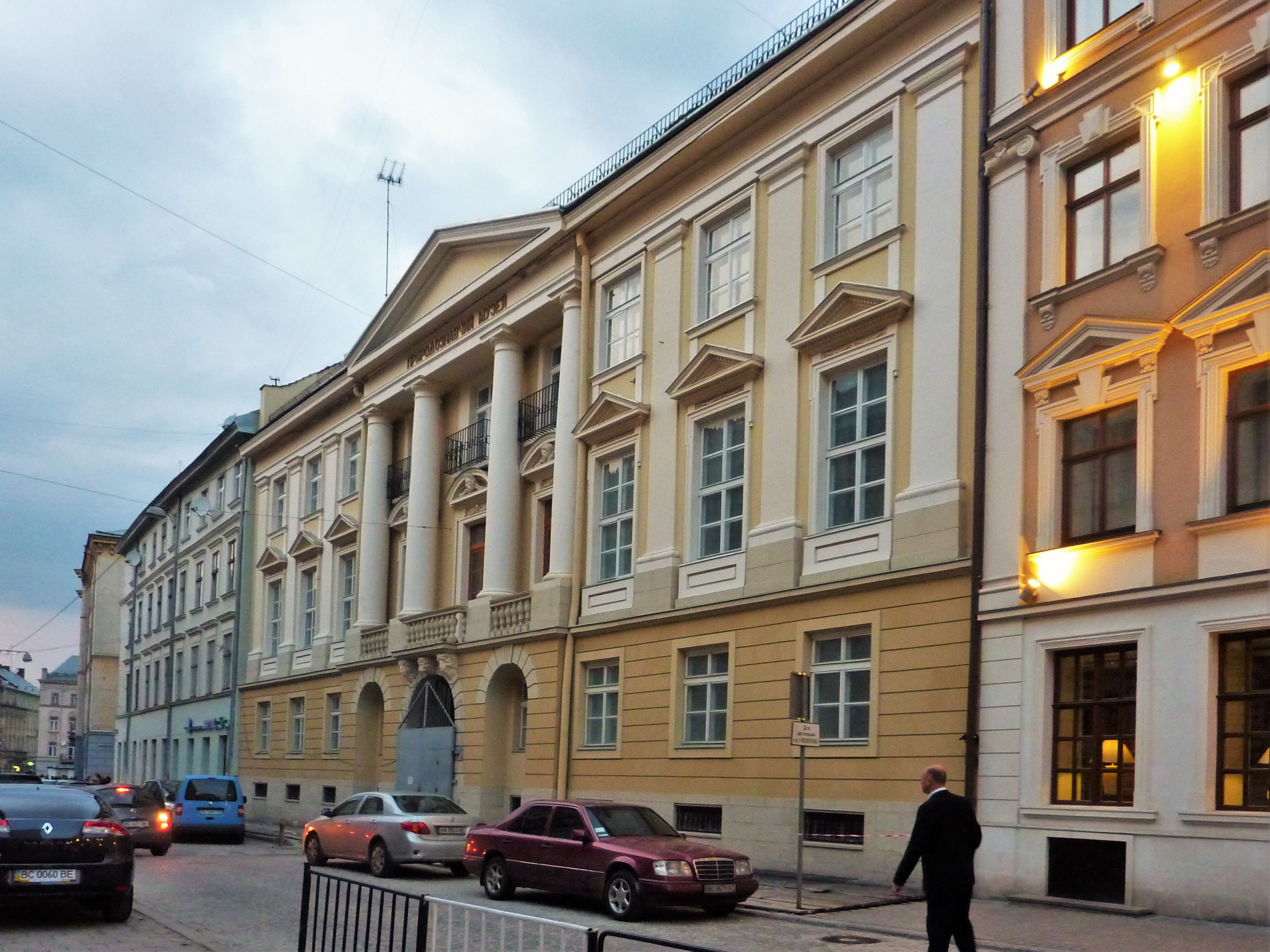
Dzieduszycki Museum of Natural History in Lviv

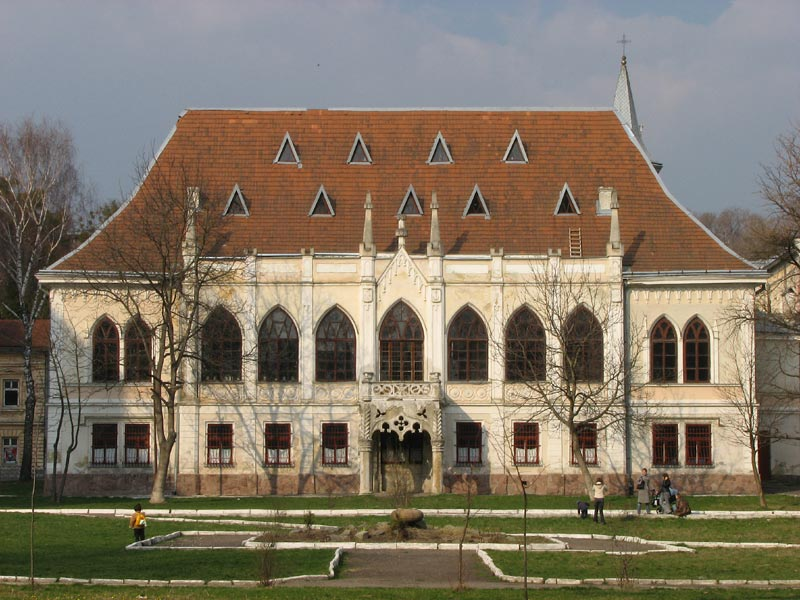
The Palace of Turkull-Comello in Lviv

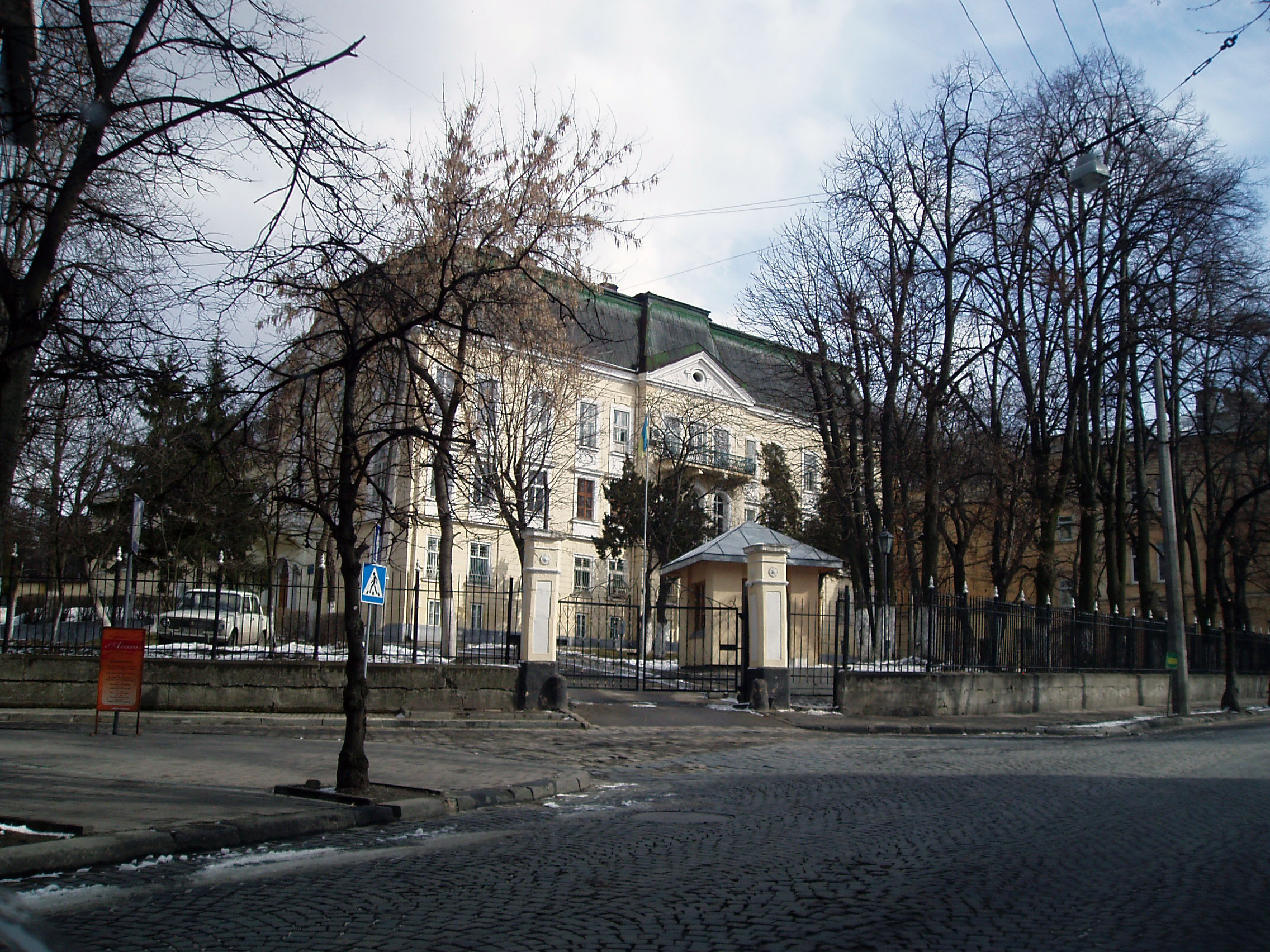
Dzieduszycki Palace in Lviv

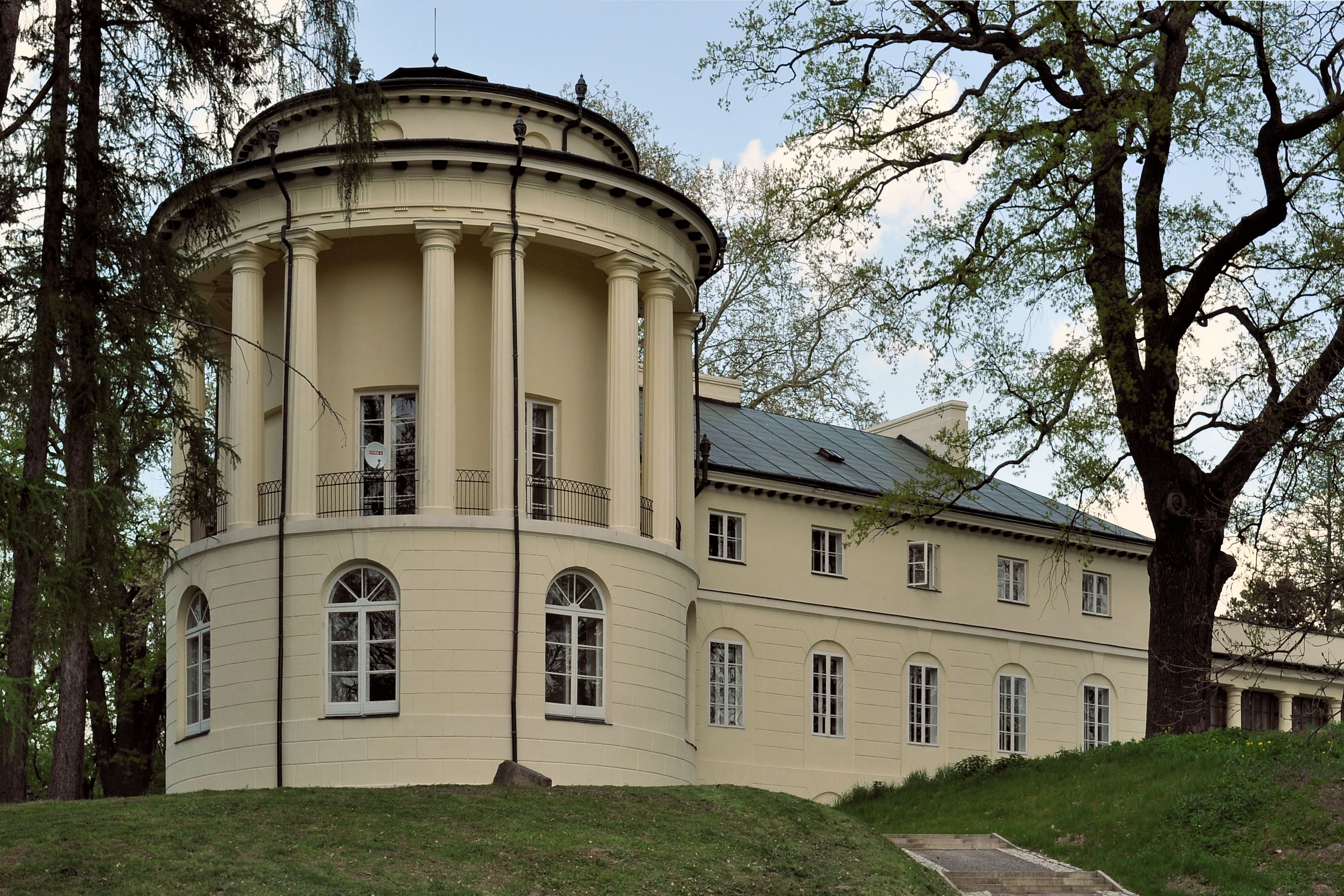
Dzieduszycki Palace in Zarzecze

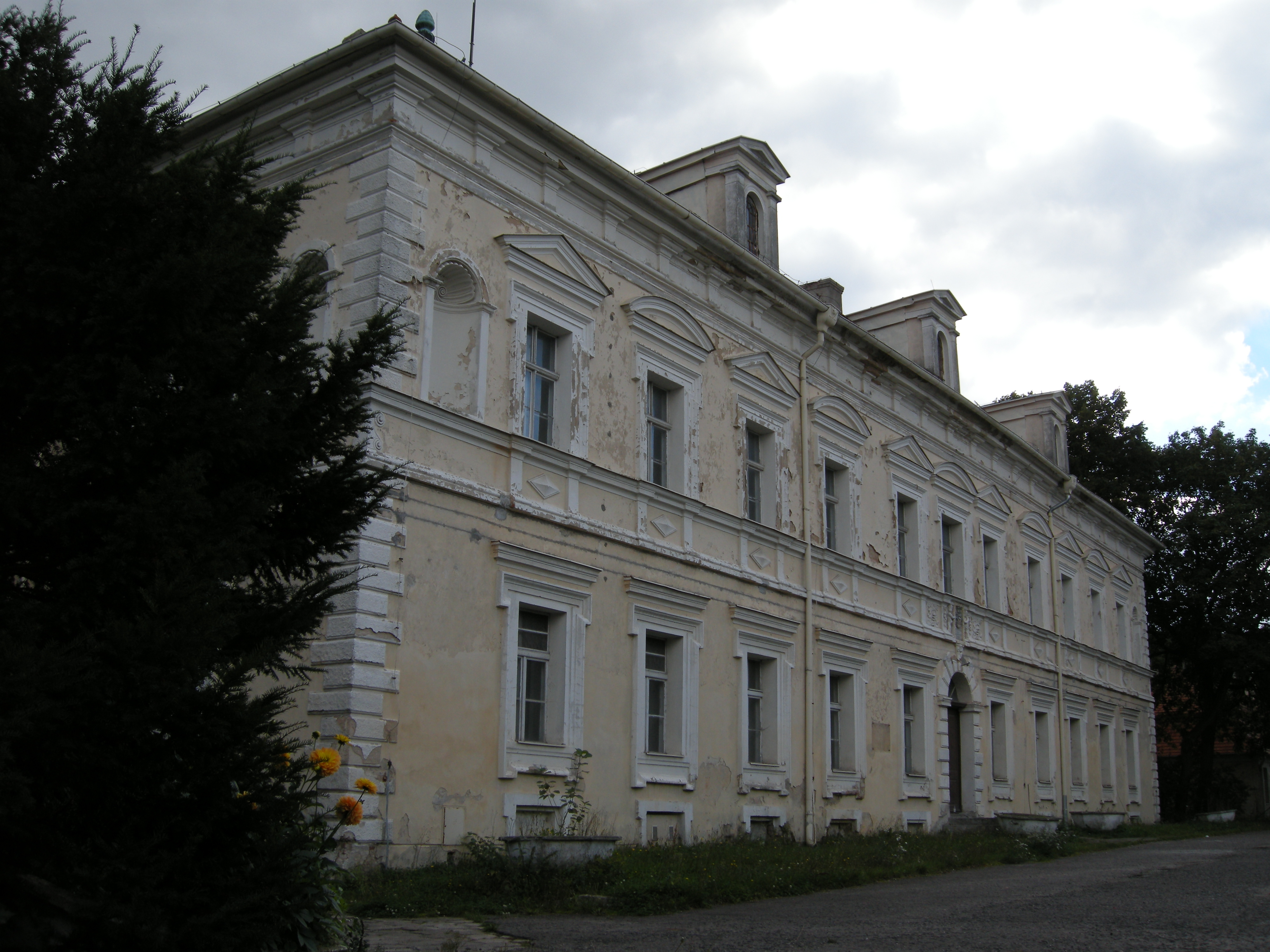
Ruins of Konarzew Palace

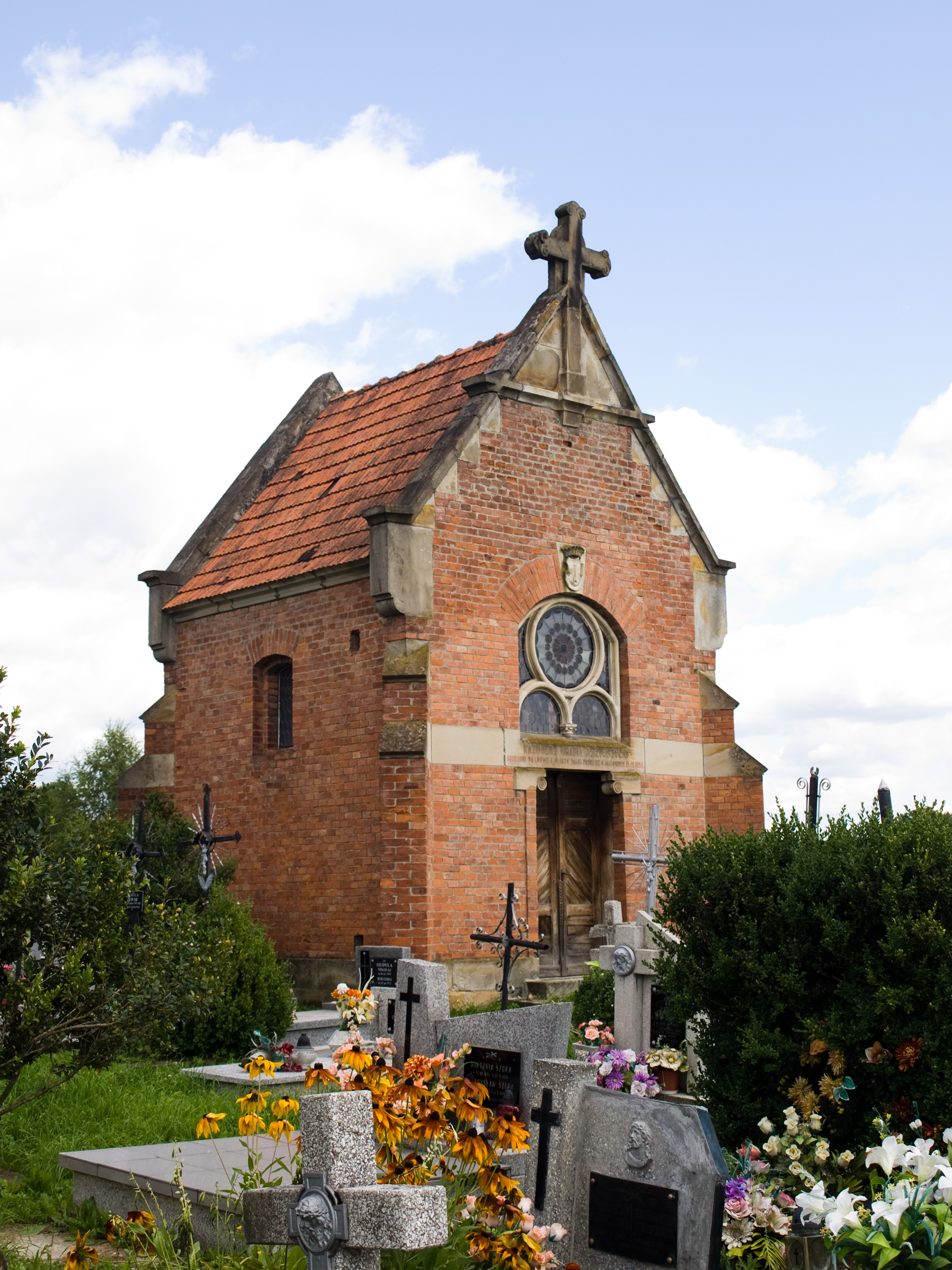
Dzieduszycki Chapel in Jasionów

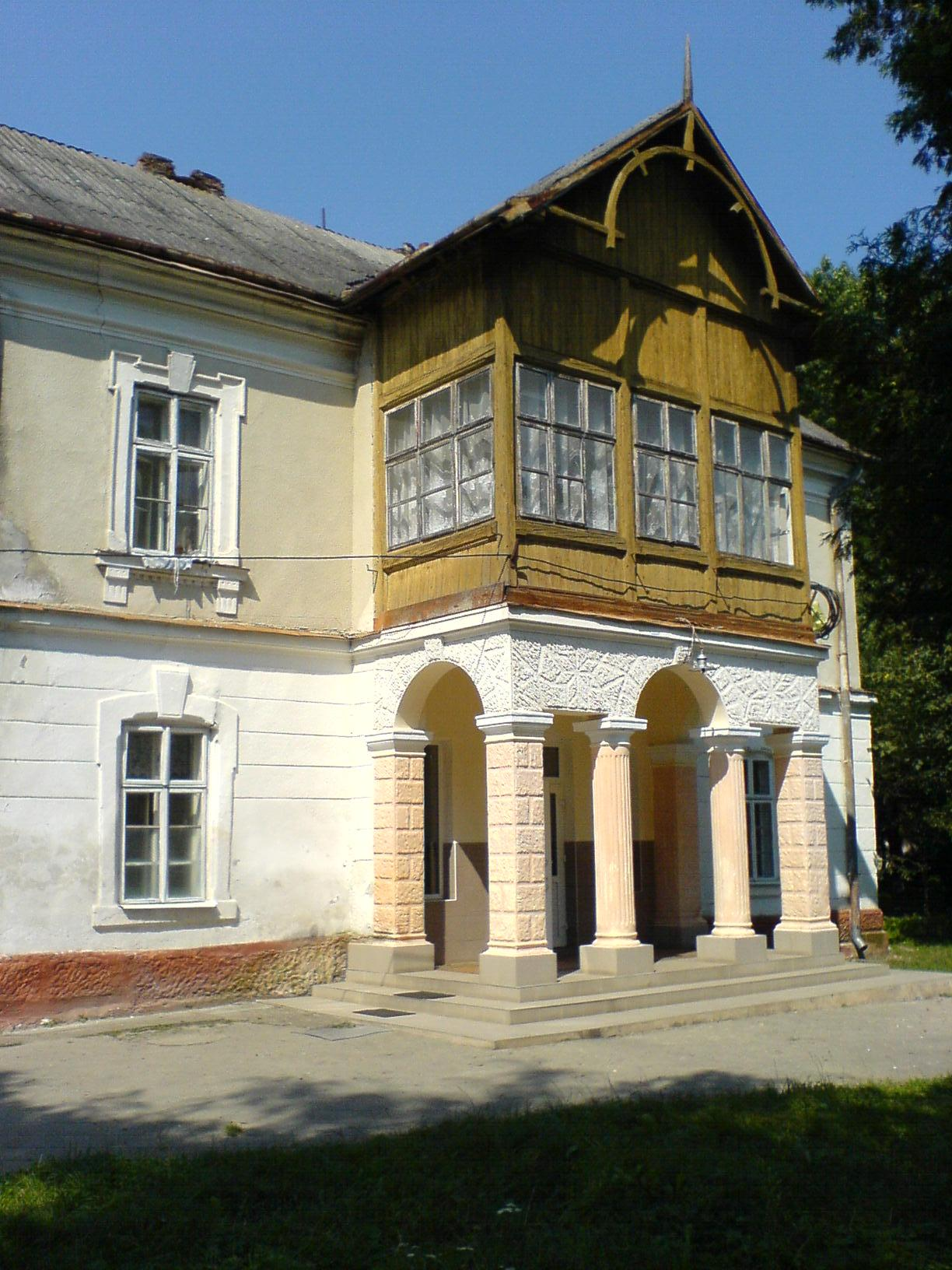
Dzieduszycki Manor House in Jezupol

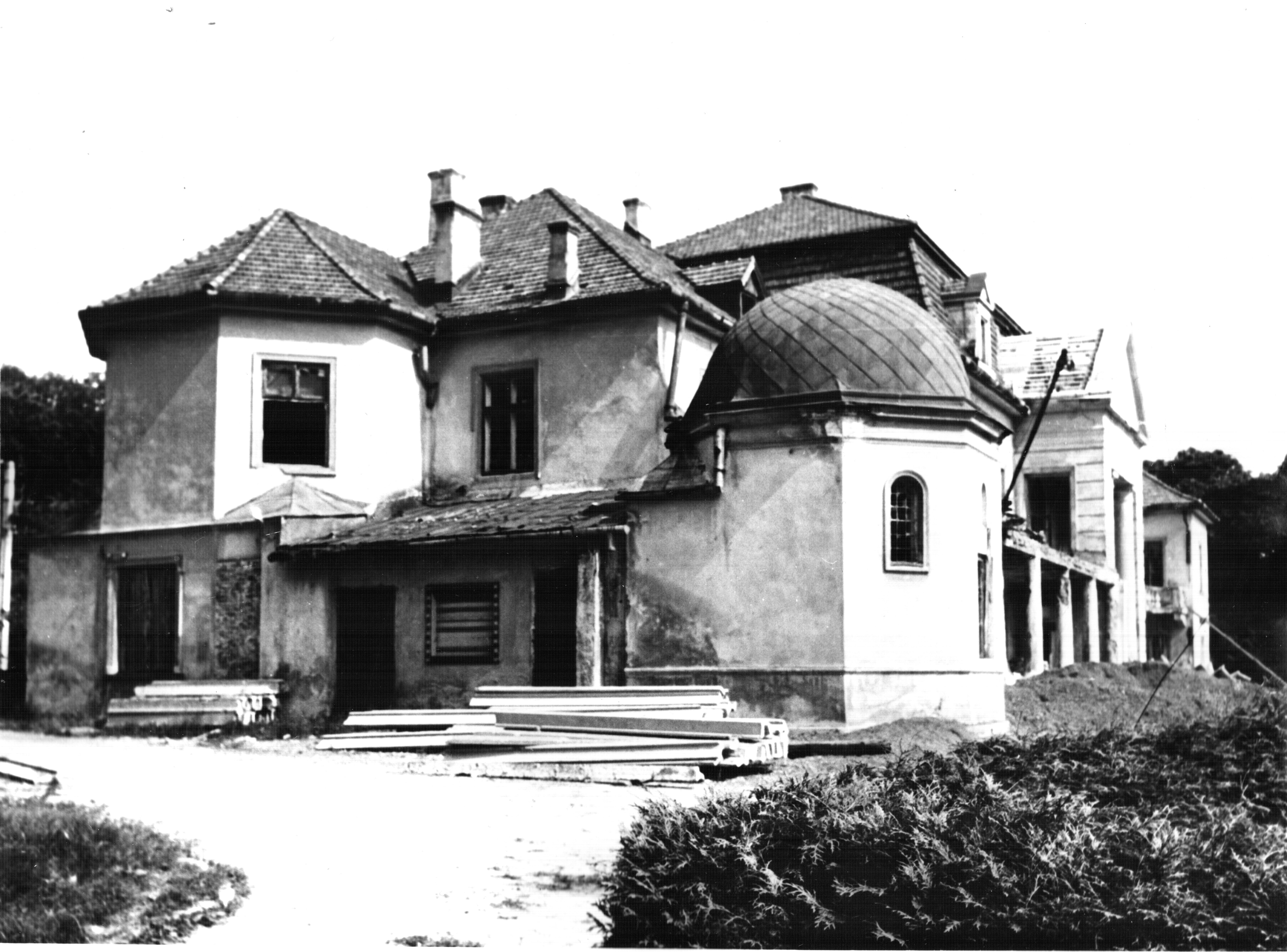
Ruined Dzieduszycki Manor House in Niesłuchów
