= Kisielów =

Kisielów may refer to the following villages in Poland:

- Kisielów, Silesian Voivodeship (south Poland)
- Kisielów, Subcarpathian Voivodeship (south-east Poland)
