= Siennów =

- Village
- Location within Poland
- Coordinates: 49°58′N 22°30′E
- Country: Poland
- Voivodeship: Subcarpathian
- County: Przeworsk
- Gmina: Zarzecze

Siennów [ˈɕɛnːuf] is a village in the administrative district of Gmina Zarzecze, within Przeworsk County, Subcarpathian Voivodeship, in south-eastern Poland.
