= Tadeusz Fiszbach =

Polish politician and diplomat (born 1935)

Tadeusz Rudolf Fiszbach
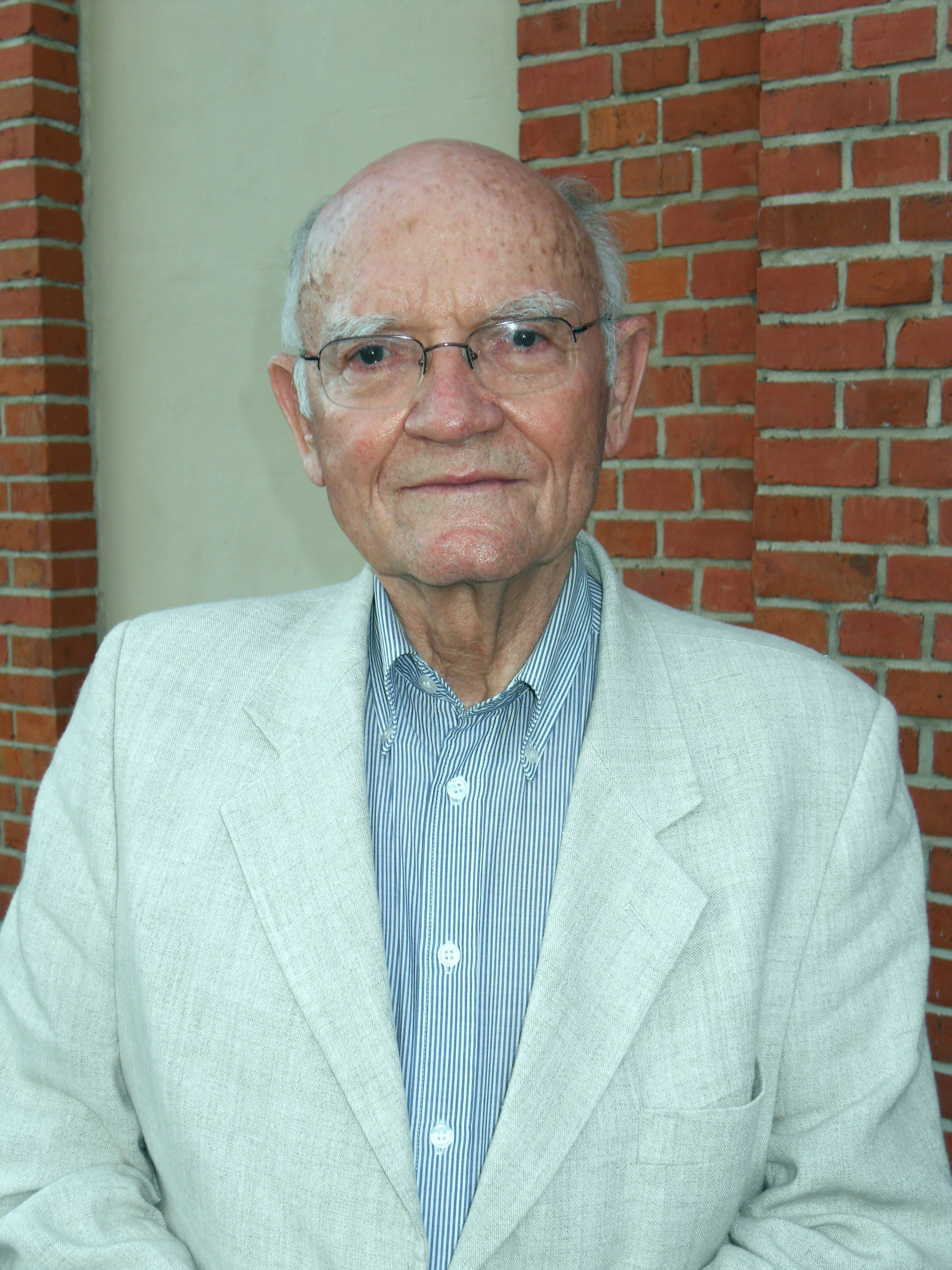
- Fiszbach in 2015

Deputy Marshal of the Sejm
- In office 4 July 1989 – 25 November 1991
- Constituency: no. 21

Polish ambassador to Latvia
- In office 2001–2005
- Preceded by: Jarosław Bratkiewicz
- Succeeded by: Maciej Klimczak

Personal details
- Born: 4 November 1935 (age 90) Dobraczyn
- Awards: Commander's Cross of Order of Polonia Restituta; Order of the Banner of Labour, 2nd class Knight's Cross of Order of Polonia Restituta; Medal of Merit for National Defence; Cross of Merit for the ZHP; Order of Janek Krasicki; Order of Prince Henry; Order of the Three Stars

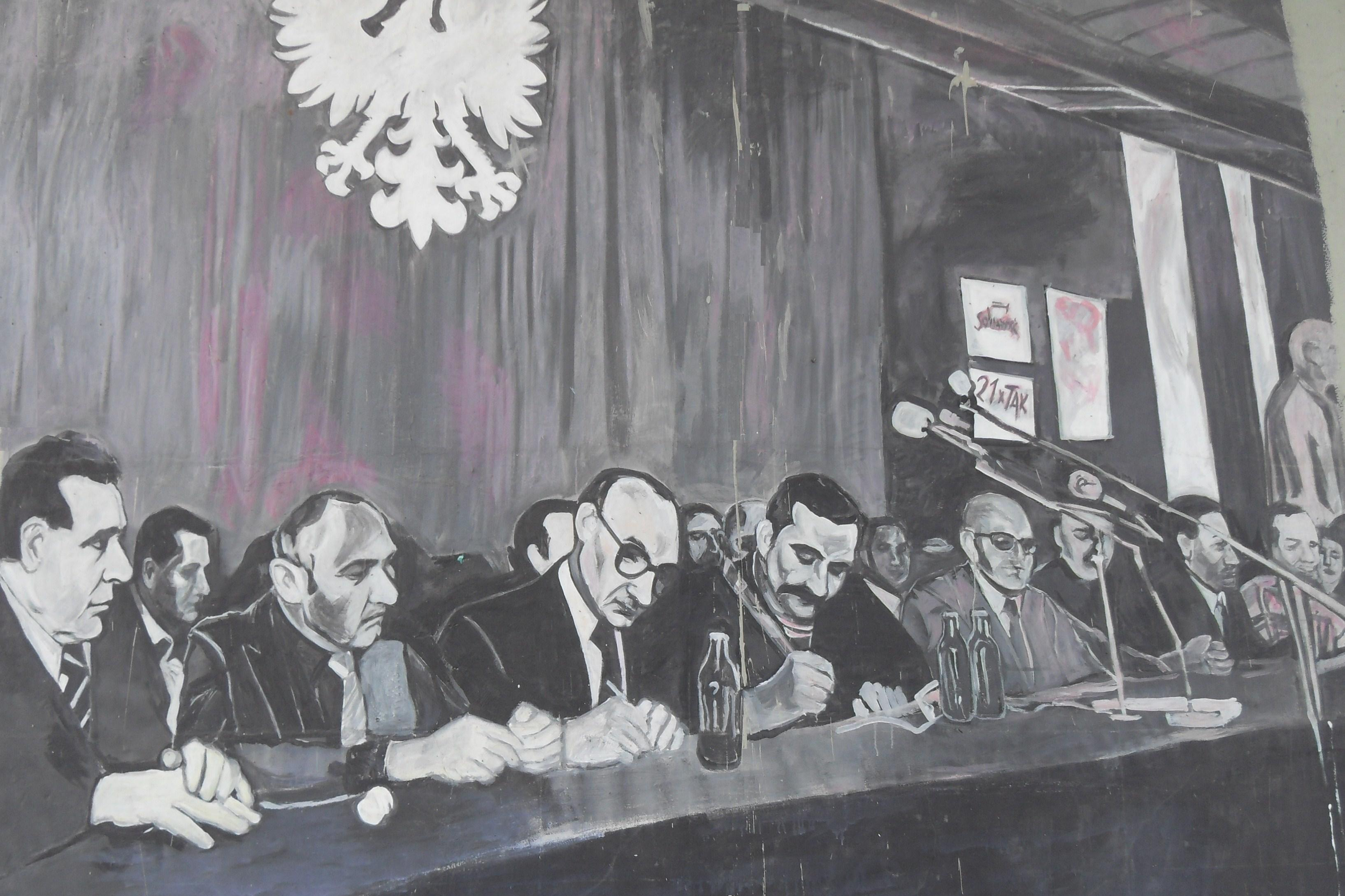
Signing of the August Agreements (1980) in Gdańsk, Tadeusz Fiszbach in the first row, fifth from the left

Tadeusz Rudolf Fiszbach (born 4 November 1935 in Dobraczyn) is a Polish politician, diplomat and academic teacher. Between 1975 and 1985 he was the First Secretary of the Provincial Committee of the Polish United Workers' Party in Gdańsk, and member of the Sejm between 1976 and 1985, and between 1989 and 1991.

== Biography ==
Fiszbach was born in the village of Dobraczyn in Lwów Voivodeship. He was a son of engineer Rudolf Fiszbach and teacher Bronisława Banach.

In 1945, the family moved to Kartuzy and lived in villa named "Erem" (The Hermitage) previously occupied by Aleksander Majkowski. In Kartuzy, Fiszbach graduated from the primary school, and in 1952 he graduated from the 1st Hieronim Derdowski High School (Polish: I Liceum Ogólnokształcące im. Hieronima Derdowskiego). In 1957, he graduated from the University of Agriculture and Technology in Olsztyn, and in 1971 from the SGH Warsaw School of Economics. In 1977 he obtained the academic degree of Doctor of Technical Sciences. After graduating, he worked, among others, in a dairy plant in Elbląg, rising from the position of foreman to plant manager. Between 1963 and 1967, he studied economy in Higher School of Social Sciences at the Central Committee of the Polish United Workers' Party.

In 1959, he became a member of the Polish United Workers' Party. He was the secretary of the district committee of the Polish United Workers' Party in Elbląg between 1964 and 1968, and between 1968 and 1971 he was the secretary of the district committee in Tczew. Between 1971 and 1975 he held the position of secretary of the provincial committee of the Polish United Workers' Party in Gdańsk, and in 1982 he became the First Secretary of the Provincial Committee. In 1980 he took part in the negotiations and signing of the August Agreements. He also chaired the Provincial National Council in Gdańsk. In 1981 he became a member of the Grabski Commission appointed by the Central Committee of the Polish United Workers' Party to determine the personal responsibility of Edward Gierek. In the same year, he joined the commission of the Central Committee of the Polish United Workers' Party (PZPR) established to explain the causes and course of social conflicts in the history of the People's Republic of Poland. He was the opponent of the martial law in Poland, which led to his removal from state positions. He was delegated to Helsinki as embassy counselor.

Between 1976 and 1985, he was a member of the Sejm of the Polish People's Republic from the Gdańsk constituency. He was a member of the Maritime Economy and Shipping Committee, and during the 7th term of office he also participated in the work of the Foreign Trade Committee. He became a member of the Sejm again in the 1989 Polish parliamentary election as a candidate of the Polish United Workers' Party after his return from Helsinki. His candidacy was informally endorsed by the Solidarity Citizens' Committee, and he managed to defeat Jan Łabęcki, a former member of the Politburo of the Polish United Workers' Party, in the runoff. During the 1989–1991 term of the Sejm, he worked in the Constitutional Committee. He took the position of Deputy Marshal of the Sejm. In July 1989, Lech Wałęsa, the leader of Solidarity, proposed Fiszbach to run against Wojciech Jaruzelski for the office of president, but Fiszbach refused. In 1989, Fiszbach founded the Polish Social Democratic Union, which proved unsuccessful and short-lived. By the end of his term, he became an independent. In the 1991 Polish parliamentary election, he unsuccessfully ran for re-election from the Gdańsk Voivodeship on behalf of a small electoral committee "Our Poland - List of Non-Partisans" (Polish: Nasza Polska – Lista Bezpartyjnych).

In the 1990s, Fiszbach became the worker of the Ministry of Foreign Affairs, serving as a commercial counselor at the Polish Embassy in Oslo. Between 2001 and 2005, he was the Polish ambassador to Latvia. He became a professor in the University of Law and Diplomacy in Gdynia. In the 2010 Polish presidential election, he endorsed Jarosław Kaczyński. In the 2025 Polish presidential election, he endorsed Karol Nawrocki.

In the film of Andrzej Wajda Wałęsa: Man of Hope, actor Adam Woronowicz played the role of Tadeusz Fiszbach.

== Personal life ==
In 1960, Tadeusz Fiszbach married Hanna Kapela. They have a son and a daughter.

== Awards ==
- Commander's Cross of Order of Polonia Restituta (2014)
- Order of the Banner of Labour, 2nd class
- Knight's Cross of Order of Polonia Restituta (1972)
- Order of Prince Henry, 2nd class (1976, Portugal)
- Order of the Three Stars, 3rd class (2005, Latvia)
- Golden Medal of Merit for National Defence
- Cross of Merit for the ZHP
- Order of Janek Krasicki
- Medal of Prince Mściwoj II (2008)
- Medal "For Merit to the Medical Academy in Gdańsk" (1975)
- Badge of Honor of the Union of Latvian National and Cultural Associations named after Ita Kozakiewicz (2007)

== Bibliography ==
- "Wywiady: Tadeusz Fiszbach kocha Kartuzy (rozmawiał Mirosław Begger)". kurierkartuski.pl. 17 August 2010.
- "Profil na stronie Biblioteki Sejmowej".
- "Fiszbach Tadeusz". gedanopedia.pl.
