= Zalesie Żurowskie =

- Village
- Location within Poland
- Coordinates: 50°00′44″N 22°31′51″E
- Country: Poland
- Voivodeship: Subcarpathian
- County: Przeworsk
- Gmina: Zarzecze

Zalesie Żurowskie [zaˈlɛɕɛ ʐuˈrɔfskʲɛ] is a village in the administrative district of Gmina Zarzecze, within Przeworsk County, Subcarpathian Voivodeship, in south-eastern Poland.
