= Gmina Zarzecze =

Gmina Zarzecze Zarzecze Commune
- Gmina
- Flag Coat of arms
- Interactive map of Gmina Zarzecze
- Coordinates (Zarzecze): 49°59′10″N 22°32′14″E
- Country: Poland
- Voivodeship: Subcarpathian
- County: Przeworsk
- Seat: Zarzecze

Area
  - Total: 49.24 km^{2} (19.01 sq mi)

Population (2011)
  - Total: 7,183
  - Density: 145.9/km^{2} (377.8/sq mi)
- Website: https://gminazarzecze.pl/

Gmina Zarzecze is a rural gmina (administrative district) in Przeworsk County, Subcarpathian Voivodeship, in south-eastern Poland. Its seat is the village of Zarzecze, which lies approximately 10 kilometres (6 mi) south of Przeworsk and 39 km (24 mi) east of the regional capital Rzeszów.

The gmina covers an area of 49.24 square kilometres (19.0 sq mi), and as of 2006 its total population is 7,174 (7,183 in 2011).

== Villages ==
Gmina Zarzecze contains the villages and settlements of Kisielów, Łapajówka, Maćkówka, Parcelacja Rożniatowska, Pełnatycze, Rożniatów, Siennów, Zalesie Żurowskie, Zarzecze and Żurawiczki.

== Neighbouring gminas ==
Gmina Zarzecze is bordered by the town of Przeworsk and by the gminas of Kańczuga, Pawłosiów, Pruchnik, Przeworsk and Roźwienica.
