= Rożniatów, Podkarpackie Voivodeship =

Rożniatów
- Village
- Location within Poland
- Coordinates: 49°59′N 22°32′E
- Country: Poland
- Voivodeship: Subcarpathian
- County: Przeworsk
- Gmina: Zarzecze

Rożniatów [rɔʐˈɲatuf] is a village in the administrative district of Gmina Zarzecze, within Przeworsk County, Subcarpathian Voivodeship, in south-eastern Poland.
