= Włodzimierz Dzieduszycki (ornithologist, born 1885) =

Polish nobleman and ornithologist

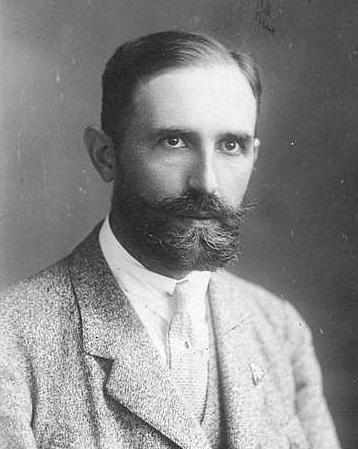
Dzieduszycki in 1928

Count Włodzimierz Dzieduszycki (10 May 1885 – 9 September 1971) was a Polish nobleman, sportsman and ornithologist. He was a member of the Polish Committee for War Victims at the end of World War I and during World War II he created an underground resistance force in Zarzecze to protect Polish refugees.

Włodzimierz was born in Lviv as a son of Anna (1859–1917) and Tadeusz Dzieduszycki (1841–1918). His father was a deputy to the Galician Diet and served as starosta of Zaleszczyki. His grandfather Włodzimierz Ksawery Dzieduszycki (1825–1899) was the founder of the Natural History Museum Dzieduszycki in Lviv. Graduating from the Bartłomiej Nowodworski High School in Kraków in 1903, he spent time at the Tsarskoye Selo Lyceum, then studied at the Lviv Polytechnic for two years, finally graduating in agriculture from the Jagiellonian University. He managed his family estate in Poland and Podolia from 1912 to 1917 and then served as secretary of the Polish Committee for War Victims at Kiev. He moved to Lviv in 1918 and served as curator to the natural history museum. In 1937 he created a reserve for birds of prey and in 1939 he began a bird ringing station. During World War II he established an armed underground force at Zarzecze and provided shelter to refugees from Poland. He moved to Warsaw towards the end of the Second World War. From 1945 to 1958 he worked on the bird collections in the Polish Academy of Sciences.

He received the French Order of Agricultural Merit in 1924. From 1926 to 1933 he presided over the LKS Pogoń Lwów sports club. He married Wanda Sapieha-Różańska in 1912 and they had seven sons and six daughters. Son Eustachy Dzieduszycki (1917–1997) worked as an assistant to the wildlife film-maker Włodzimierz Puchalski.
