= Żurawiczki =

- Village
- Location within Poland
- Coordinates: 50°1′N 22°31′E
- Country: Poland
- Voivodeship: Subcarpathian
- County: Przeworsk
- Gmina: Zarzecze

Żurawiczki [ʐuraˈvʲit͡ʂkʲi] is a village in the administrative district of Gmina Zarzecze, within Przeworsk County, Subcarpathian Voivodeship, in south-eastern Poland.
