= Pełnatycze =

- Village
- Location within Poland
- Coordinates: 49°58′12″N 22°33′8″E
- Country: Poland
- Voivodeship: Subcarpathian
- County: Przeworsk
- Gmina: Zarzecze

Pełnatycze [pɛu̯naˈtɨt͡ʂɛ] is a village in the administrative district of Gmina Zarzecze, within Przeworsk County, Subcarpathian Voivodeship, in south-eastern Poland.
