= Parcelacja Rożniatowska =

- Village
- Location within Poland
- Coordinates: 49°58′22″N 22°31′16″E
- Country: Poland
- Voivodeship: Subcarpathian
- County: Przeworsk
- Gmina: Zarzecze

Parcelacja Rożniatowska [part͡sɛˈlat͡sja rɔʐɲaˈtɔfska] is a village in the administrative district of Gmina Zarzecze, within Przeworsk County, Subcarpathian Voivodeship, in south-eastern Poland.
