= Józef Dziędzielewicz =

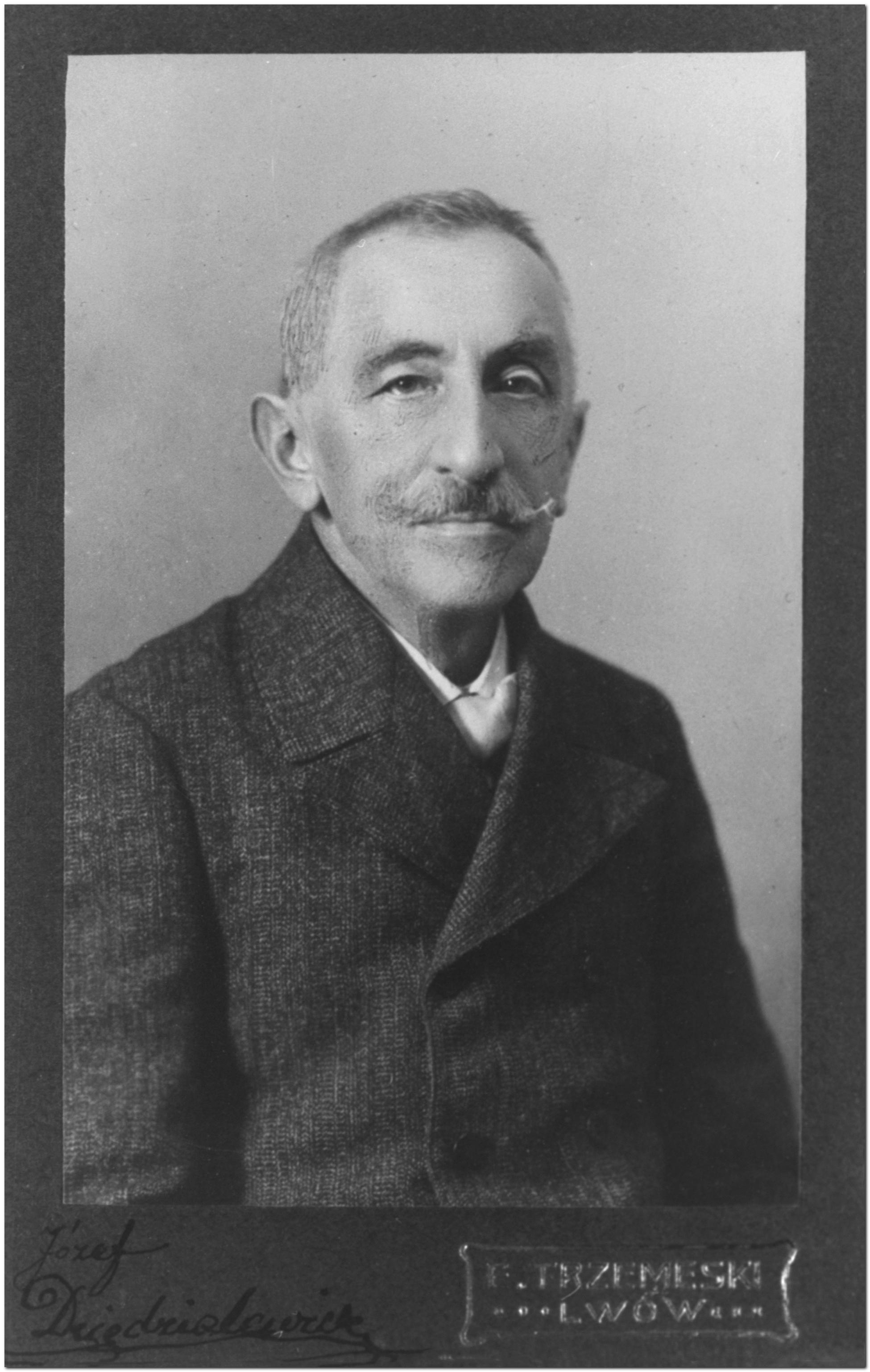
Portrait from the Library of the Museum and Institute of Zoology, Polish Academy of Sciences

Józef Dziędzielewicz (4 September 1844 – 24 February 1918) was a Polish entomologist and a specialist on the insect fauna of the Carpathians particularly of the Neuroptera, Trichoptera and Odonata.

Dziędzielewicz was born on in Lviv and when at high school became a friend of Marian Łomnicki, who introduced him to entomology. He then went to study Law at the University of Lviv and here he came in contact with count Włodzimierz Dzieduszycki who was setting up a natural history museum. He collected specimens in the field and helped Dzieduszycki organize the collections of the museum. He received a doctorate in law in 1871 and became a court intern at Przemyśl. He later worked in Lviv, Pechenizhin, Kołomyja, Chortkiv, Tarnopol and Kołomyja. In 1867 he became a member of the Krakow Scientific Society's physiographic commission and surveyed river basins in the region. He publisher a paper on lacewings and became a member of the Tatra Society. He moved to Lviv in 1895 and the next year he became a secretary of the council of Dzieduszycki's museum. He began to study dragonflies and in 1905 he worked as a court councillor. He retired from his legal profession in 1907 and continued to study insects including the collections of Maksymilian Nowicki made in the Tatras. He collaborated with Piotr Kempny, František Klapálek, Kenneth J. Morton, Friedrich Ris, Georg Ulmer and Günther Enderlein. He produced a monograph on the dragonflies of the region. He moved to Myślenice in 1915 and stayed there during World War I and until his death.
