= Maćkówka =

- Village
- Location within Poland
- Coordinates: 50°2′N 22°31′E
- Country: Poland
- Voivodeship: Subcarpathian
- County: Przeworsk
- Gmina: Zarzecze

Maćkówka [mat͡ɕˈkufka] is a village in the administrative district of Gmina Zarzecze, within Przeworsk County, Subcarpathian Voivodeship, in south-eastern Poland.
