= Dobraczyn =

Village in Lviv Oblast, Ukraine

Dobraczyn Добрячин
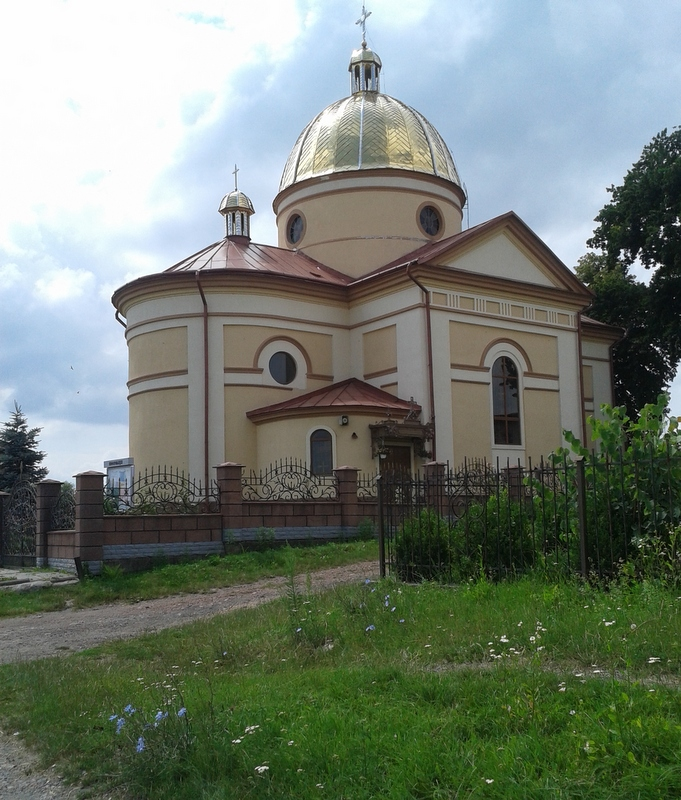
- Church of the Exaltation of the Holy Cross

- Location within Lviv Oblast Location within Ukraine
- Coordinates: 50°24′36″N 24°14′24″E
- Country: Ukraine
- Oblast: Lviv
- Raion: Sheptytskyi
- Elevation: 190 m (623 ft)

Population (2022)
  - Total: 815
- Time zone: UTC+2 (EET)
  - Summer (DST): UTC+3 (UTC+03:00)
- Area code: 80053

Dobraczyn (Ukrainian: Добрячин) is a village in Ukraine located in the Sheptytskyi Raion of the Lviv Oblast. It had 815 residents in 2022.

== History ==
In the Second Polish Republic it was an independent unitary gmina until 1934. Afterwards, it became a part of the Krystynopol gmina in the Sokalski powiat of the Lwów Voivodeship.

Between 1943 and 1944, Ukrainian nationalists from OUN-UPA murdered 30 Poles and 1 Ukrainian in Dobraczyn, looting and burning farmsteads. They also attacked several Polish carts on a nearby road, killing the travelers, including Stanisław Mucha, a Bernandine priest travelling from Czerwonogród to Sokal.

After World War II, Dobraczyn became a part of the Hrubieszów County of the Lublin Voivodeship. However, in 1951, the village together with the entirety of the Krystynopol gmina was annexed into the Soviet Union as part of the border swap agreement.

Prior to 1937, a Reading Room TSL Folk School Society was created in Dobraczyn.

In Dobraczyn were born:

- Dmytro Levytsky (1877-1942) - Ukrainian lawyer, doctor of law, political activist, president of the Ukrainian National Democratic Alliance (1926-1935), and member of the Polish Sejm (1928-1935).
- Tadeusz Fiszbach (born 1935) - Polish politician, diplomat, academic teacher, former First Secretary of the Provincial Committee of the Polish United Workers' Party in Gdańsk, member of the Polish Sejm between 1976-1985 and 1989-1991, Deputy Marshal of the Sejm (1989-1991).
