= Zarzecze, Przeworsk County =

Zarzecze
- Village
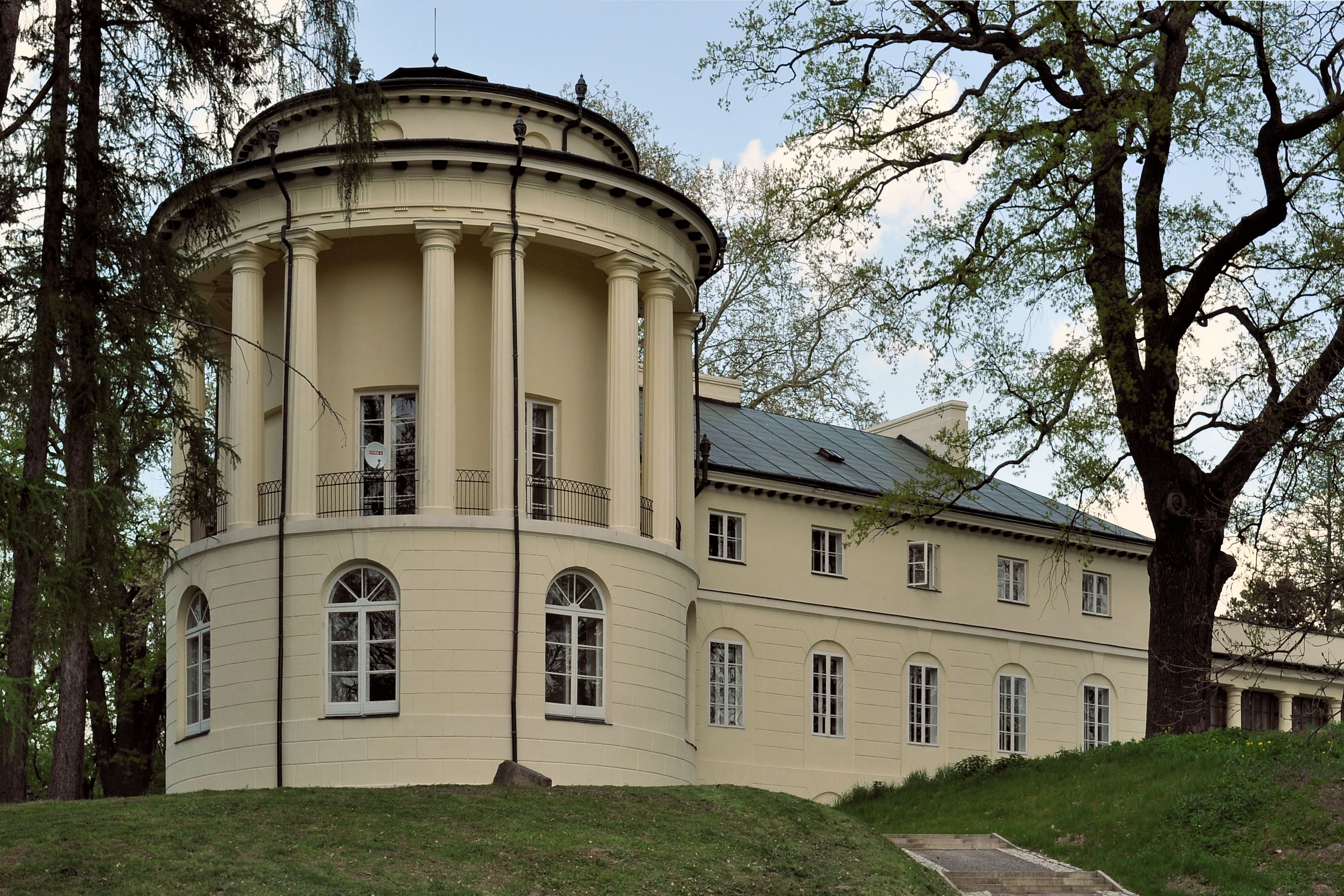

- Location within Poland
- Coordinates: 49°59′10″N 22°32′14″E
- Country: Poland
- Voivodeship: Subcarpathian
- County: Przeworsk
- Gmina: Zarzecze
- Population: 1,400

Zarzecze [zaˈʐɛt͡ʂɛ] is a village in Przeworsk County, Subcarpathian Voivodeship, in south-eastern Poland. It is the seat of the gmina (administrative district) called Gmina Zarzecze.

Dzieduszycki Palace is located here.
