= Kisielów, Podkarpackie Voivodeship =

Kisielów
- Village
- Location within Poland
- Coordinates: 49°59′19″N 22°33′30″E
- Country: Poland
- Voivodeship: Podkarpackie
- County: Przeworsk
- Gmina: Zarzecze

Kisielów [kiˈɕɛluf] is a village in the administrative district of Gmina Zarzecze, within Przeworsk County, Podkarpackie Voivodeship, in south-eastern Poland.
