= Włodzimierz Dzieduszycki =

Polish nobleman and naturalist (1825–1899)

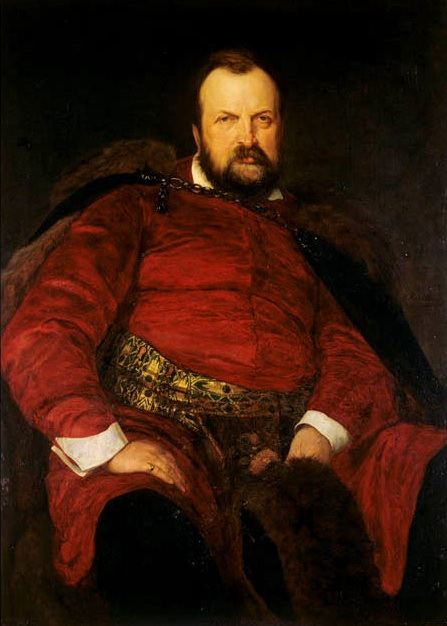
- Portrait by Henryk Rodakowski (1880)

- Coat of arms
- Born: 22 August 1825; Yaryshiv, Podolia Governorate
- Died: 18 September 1899 (aged 74); Poturzyca, Partitioned Poland
- Noble family: House of Dzieduszycki
- Spouse: Countess Alfonsyna Miączyńska
- Issue: Klementyna Dzieduszycka; Anna Dzieduszycka; Maria Dzieduszycka; Jadwiga Dzieduszycka
- Father: Count Józef Kalasanty Dzieduszycki
- Mother: Countess Paulina Działyńska

Count Włodzimierz Ksawery Tadeusz Dzieduszycki (Polish pronunciation: [vwɔˈd͡ʑi.mjɛʂ d͡ʑɛ.duˈʂɨt͡s.ki]; 22 June 1825 – 18 September 1899) was a Polish noble, landowner, naturalist, political activist, collector and patron of arts of Ruthenian heritage. Włodzimierz became the first Ordynat of the Poturzyca estate. He was owner of the Poturzyca, Zarzecze, Kramarzowka, Markpol, Lachowice, Dobraczyn, Medowa, Jaryszow, Konarzewo, Gluszyn, Wiry and Szczytnik estates and a founder of the Natural History Museum in Lviv (Lwów). He was one of the first Polish magnates to replace serfdom on his estates.

== Biography ==
Dzieduszycki was born in Jaryszów in the Russian Podolia, the son of Józef Kalasanty (1776–1847) and Paulina Anna née Działyńska and was educated in Poland and from 1840 in Göttingen and Paris. Józef had been active in the Kościuszko Uprising and the Napoleonic campaign before settling at home and working as a bibliographer. Paulina was the sister of Tytus Działyński who was a keen naturalist and collector. In 1846 Wlodzimierz returned to Poland.

During the Spring of Nations in 1848, he became a member of the "Council of the Nation of Lwow" (Centralna Rada Narodowa Lwowska) and pro-Polish organisation Ruski (Ruskyi) Sobor (opposite to the Holovna Ruska Rada).

He was also a member of the "Economic Society of Galicia". In 1855 Dzieduszycki became a cofounder of the Dubliany Ploughing School (today Agricultural Academy). He supported publishing houses, spent money for scientific works and school books. Dzieduszycki was a great enthusiast of the Hutsul Arts and financed translation into Polish for the work of Volodymyr Shukhevych "Hutsulshchyna". In 1863 he partly financed and participated in the civil organisation of the January Uprising.

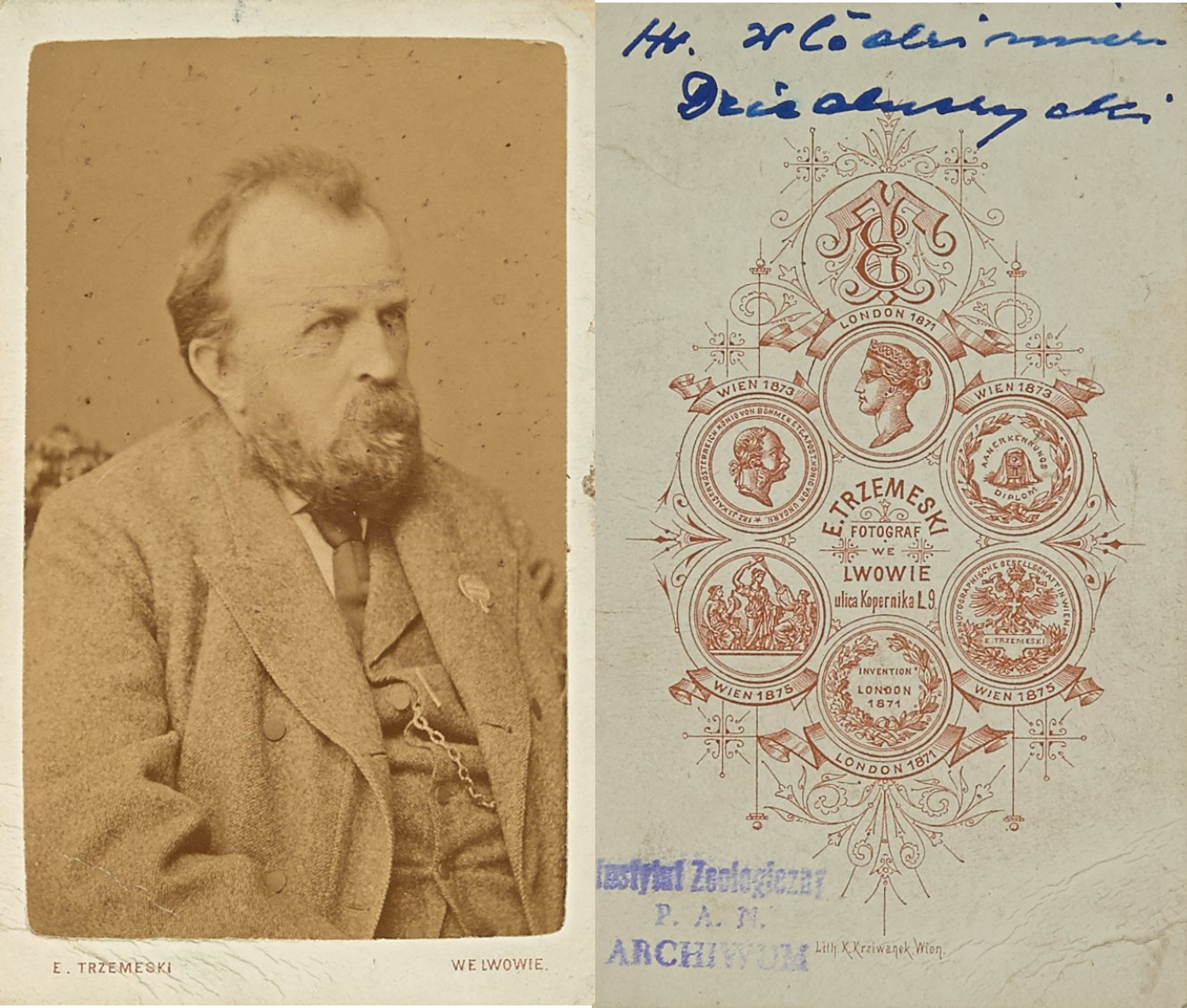
Carte de visite

In 1881 Wlodzimierz became a member of the Polish Academy of Arts and Sciences. Dzieduszycki collected specimens of fauna and flora from his childhood and held them in his palace in Poturzyce, 80 km north of Lviv. His collection grew with additions of fossils and minerals from Professor Ludwik Zejszner and plants from Jan Łobarzewski. He moved a part of this collection to Lvov to a building in Fredro Street in 1854 and then to Kurkowa Street (now Lysenka Street) in 1857. As the collections grew he bought a building in 1868 on Teatralna Street where the museum still stands. It was open to the public in 1870. The museum is now called the State Museum of Natural History of the National Academy of Sciences of Ukraine. The Museum includes a rich natural collection, mainly ornithology, ethnography and numismatic objects and a large collection of books. The entomological collections were organized by Józef Dziędzielewicz.

He was also co-founder of the Museum of Industry of Arts (Muzeum Przemysłu Artystycznego) in 1874 in Lviv and founder the "Hunting Society of Lesser Poland" in 1885.

Wlodzimierz became a member the Sejm in 1865, 1874 and from 1895 until 1899; he served as Sejm Marshal from 7 March until 26 April 1876. He was also a member of the Herrenhaus from 1874.

He was author of several scientific works (nature and ethnography), and from 1894 Doctor Honoris Causa of the Lwów University.

== Family ==
Włodzimierz married Alfonsyna Miączyńska on 19 September 1853 in Lwów and had four children:

- Klementyna (1855–1929), married to Zygmunt Szembek
- Anna (1859–1917), married to Tadeusz Piotr Dzieduszycki
- Paulina (1861–1866)
- Maria (1863–1941), married to Tadeusz Celestyn Cieński
- Jadwiga (1867–1941), married to Witold Leon Czartoryski

== Eponymy ==
Dzieduszyckia, a genus of Devonian brachiopods, was named in his honour.

== Bibliography ==
- Gabriel Brzęk – Muzeum im. Dzieduszyckich we Lwowie i jego Twórca
