= Lower Silesian Voivodeship =

Voivodeship of Poland

Lower Silesian Voivodeship Województwo dolnośląskie
- Voivodeship
- Flag Coat of arms Brandmark

- Location within Poland

- Division into 26 land counties and 4 citiescounties
- Coordinates (Wrocław): 51°07′N 17°02′E
- Country: Poland
- Capital: Wrocław
- Counties* 26 land counties and 4 cities: List: Jelenia Góra; Legnica; Wałbrzych; Wrocław; Bolesławiec County; Dzierżoniów County; Głogów County; Góra County; Jawor County; Karkonosze County; Kamienna Góra County; Kłodzko County; Legnica County; Lubań County; Lubin County; Lwówek County; Milicz County; Oleśnica County; Oława County; Polkowice County; Strzelin County; Środa County; Świdnica County; Trzebnica County; Wałbrzych County; Wołów County; Wrocław County; Ząbkowice County; Zgorzelec County; Złotoryja County

Government
  - Body: Lower Silesian Voivodeship executive board
  - Voivode: Anna Żabska
  - Marshal: Paweł Gancarz (PSL)
  - EP: Lower Silesian and Opole

Area
  - Total: 19,946.74 km^{2} (7,701.48 sq mi)

Population (2024-06-30)
  - Total: 2,868,242
  - Density: 143.7950/km^{2} (372.4274/sq mi)
  - Urban: 1,986,877
  - Rural: 913,109

GDP
  - Total: €70.200 billion (2024)
  - Per capita: €25,089 (2023)
- Time zone: UTC+1 (CET)
  - Summer (DST): UTC+2 (CEST)
- ISO 3166 code: PL-02
- Vehicle registration: D
- HDI (2021): 0.929 very high · 2nd
- Primary airport: Wrocław Airport
- Website: www.umwd.dolnyslask.pl
- Further divided into 169 gminas

The Lower Silesian Voivodeship, (Note: Polish: województwo dolnośląskie, [vɔjɛˈvut͡stfɔ dɔlnɔˈɕlɔ̃skjɛ]) simply known as Lower Silesia is one of the 16 voivodeships into which Poland is divided. Located in the southwestern part of the country, it covers an area of 19,946 square kilometres (7,701 sq mi), and as of 2024 has a total population of 2,868,242. Its capital and largest city is Wrocław, situated on the Oder. The voivodeship borders Germany to its west, the Czech Republic to its south, the Lubusz Voivodeship to its northeast and the Greater Poland and Opole voivodeships to its northeast and east, covering the majority of the historical region of Lower Silesia and parts of Upper Lusatia.

It is the ones of the wealthiest voivodeships of Poland, as natural resources such as copper, brown coal and other rock materials are widely present. In addition, the voivodeship is home to a number of spa towns, castles, and palaces. In its southern part are the Sudetes and Giant Mountains. For this reason, tourism contributes to a large part of the voivodeship's economy. Lower Silesia is divided into 26 counties, and four city-counties: Wrocław, Jelenia Góra, Legnica, and Wałbrzych.

== History ==
In the past 1,200 years, the region has been part of Great Moravia, the Medieval Kingdom of Poland, the Crown of Bohemia, Kingdom of Hungary, Habsburg monarchy (Austria), Kingdom of Prussia, the German Empire, and modern Poland after 1945.

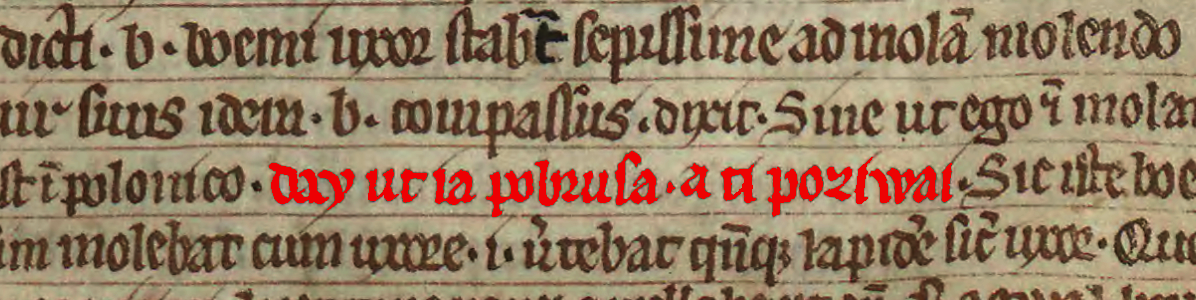
The oldest known Polish written sentence in the Book of Henryków, now held by the Archdiocesan Museum in Wrocław

Silesian tribes settled the lands at the end of the first millennium after the Migration Period. In the 9th century, the region became part of Great Moravia under Svatopluk I of Moravia and in the 10th century, Mieszko I of the Piast dynasty eventually incorporated the region to Poland. The region withstood German invasions with decisive Polish victories at Niemcza (1017) and Głogów (1109), both commemorated with monuments. It was divided into small realms reigned by Silesian branches of Piast dukes after the testament of Bolesław III Wrymouth in 1138. Wrocław was mentioned as one of three centers of the Kingdom of Poland, along with Kraków and Sandomierz, in the early-12th-century Gesta principum Polonorum chronicle. In 1241, it was the place of the Battle of Legnica, the largest battle of the Mongol invasions of Poland. With the Ostsiedlung, the cultural and ethnic Germanic influence grew with an influx of immigrants from the German-speaking areas of the Holy Roman Empire, and since the 1330s when it was subjugated to the Kingdom of Bohemia, although large portions of Lower Silesia still formed Polish-ruled duchies under the houses of Piast, Jagiellon and Sobieski, some up to the 17th and 18th century. Chief medieval ducal capitals of the area were Wrocław, Legnica, Głogów, Świdnica and Jawor. Lower Silesia was, during the Middle Ages, one of Poland's cultural centers. The Book of Henryków (1273), which contains the earliest known sentence written in the Polish language, as well as a document which contains the oldest printed text in Polish, were both created within it. The first granting of municipal privileges in Poland took place in the region, with the granting of rights for Złotoryja by Henry the Bearded. Medieval municipal rights modeled after Lwówek Śląski and Środa Śląska, both established by Henry the Bearded, became the basis of municipal form of government for several cities and towns in Poland, and two of five local Polish variants of medieval town rights. Burial sights of medieval Polish monarchs from the Piast dynasty are located in the province.

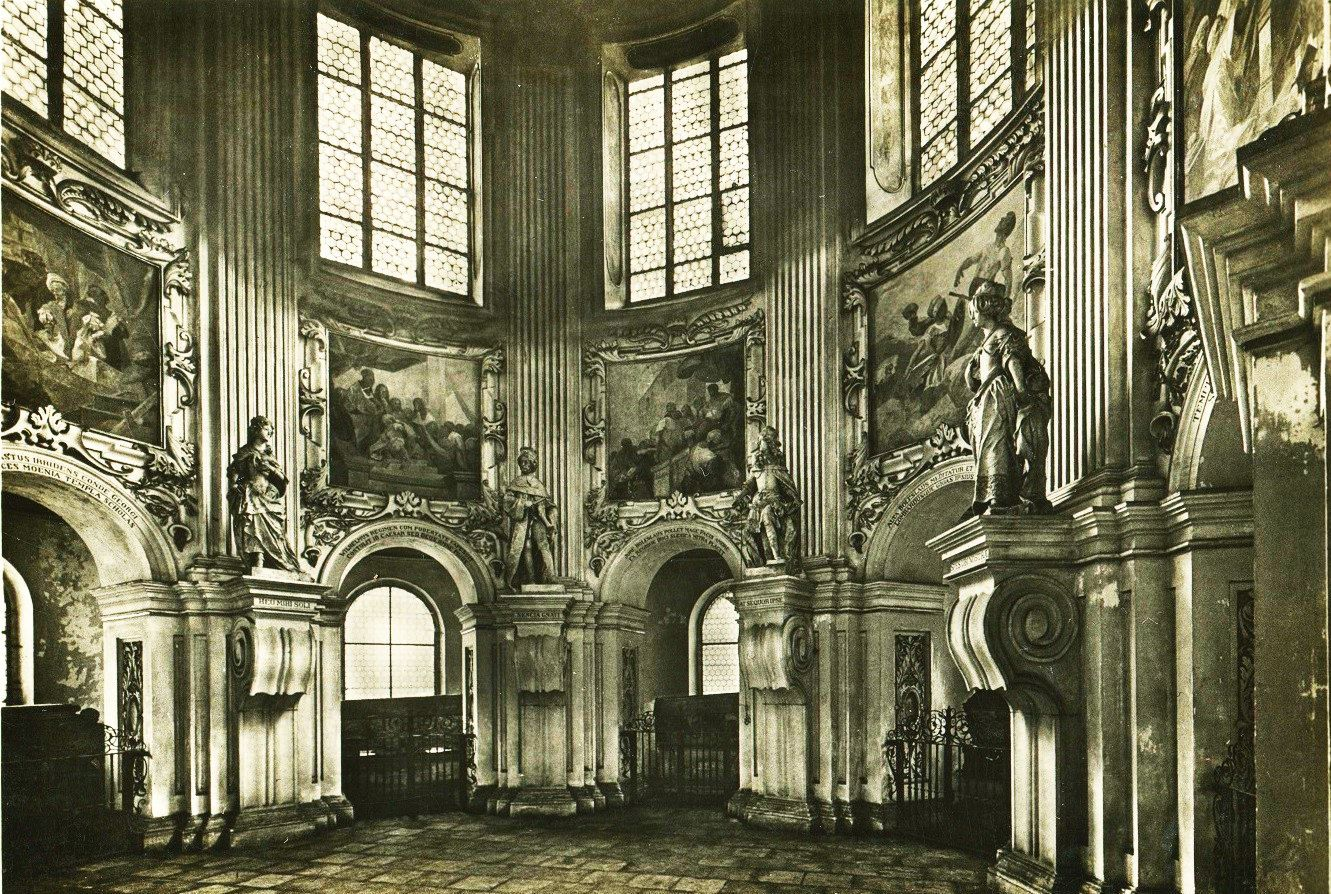
Early 20th-century view of the mausoleum of the last Piast dukes in the Church of St. John the Baptist in Legnica

In 1469, Lower Silesia passed to Hungary, and in 1490 it fell back to Bohemia, then ruled by the Jagiellonian dynasty, then together with it became part of the Habsburg monarchy (1526). In 1742/44, the territory was annexed by the Kingdom of Prussia, and subsequently became part of the German Empire (1871). Over the centuries, Lower Silesia has experienced several epochal events such as the Protestant Reformation, the Silesian Wars, Napoleonic Wars, industrialisation and the two World Wars. Before and during World War II, the region's Polish and Jewish populations were persecuted by Nazi Germany. During the war, Germany operated numerous prisons and camps in the region, most notably the Gross-Rosen concentration camp and Stalag VIII-A prisoner-of-war camp for Allied POWs of various nationalities, both with multiple subcamps scattered throughout the region and beyond, including forced labour camps at the Project Riese construction project. There was also a camp for kidnapped Polish children up to 5 years of age deemed "racially worthless" in Wąsosz, and a youth prison in Wołów with several forced labour subcamps in the region, whereas Kamieniec Ząbkowicki was the place of Aktion T4 murders of mentally ill children by involuntary euthanasia. In 1945, Lower Silesia was made again part of Poland as agreed at the post-war Potsdam Conference. As a consequence, Lower Silesia suffered a nearly total loss of its pre-war population between 1945 and 1950. Polish citizens dispossessed by the Soviets were then settled in the now emptied lands.

The voivodeship was created on 1 January 1999 out of the former Wrocław, Legnica, Wałbrzych and Jelenia Góra Voivodeships, following the Polish local government reforms adopted in 1998.

== Geography ==
Although much of the region is relatively low-lying, Lower Silesia includes the Sudeten Foreland, as well as part of the Sudetes mountain range, that runs along the Polish/Czech border. Ski resorts in the Lower Silesian Voivodeship include Karpacz and Szklarska Poręba in the Karkonosze mountains.

Lower Silesian Forest, the largest continuous forest of Poland, is mostly located within the voivodeship. The village of Henryków Lubański contains Poland's oldest tree, an over-1200-year-old yew, listed as a natural monument.

The voivodeship has a number of mineral springs and is host to a large number of spa towns. The highest point in the voivodeship is Mount Śnieżka (1,603 m (5,259 ft) above sea level) while the lowest point is located in the Oder River Valley (69 m (226 ft) above sea level).

Lower Silesian Voivodeship is bordered by Lubusz Voivodeship to the north-west, Greater Poland Voivodeship to the north-east, Opole Voivodeship to the south-east, the Czech Republic (Hradec Králové Region, Liberec Region, Olomouc Region and Pardubice Region) to the south, and Germany (Saxony) to the west.

== Transport ==
Wrocław Airport serves as an international and domestic airport.

Wrocław Główny is the most used railway station in Poland, serving an average of 29.4 million passengers annually in 2023. It offers the domestic and international connections of various carriers. The voivodeship has of the densest active railway networks in Poland thanks to its revitalisation programme. Most of the reopened connections are served by the voivodeship-owned Lower Silesian Railways.

The A4 motorway, A8 motorway, A18 motorway and S3 Expressway, S5 Expressway, S8 Expressway also run through the voivodeship.

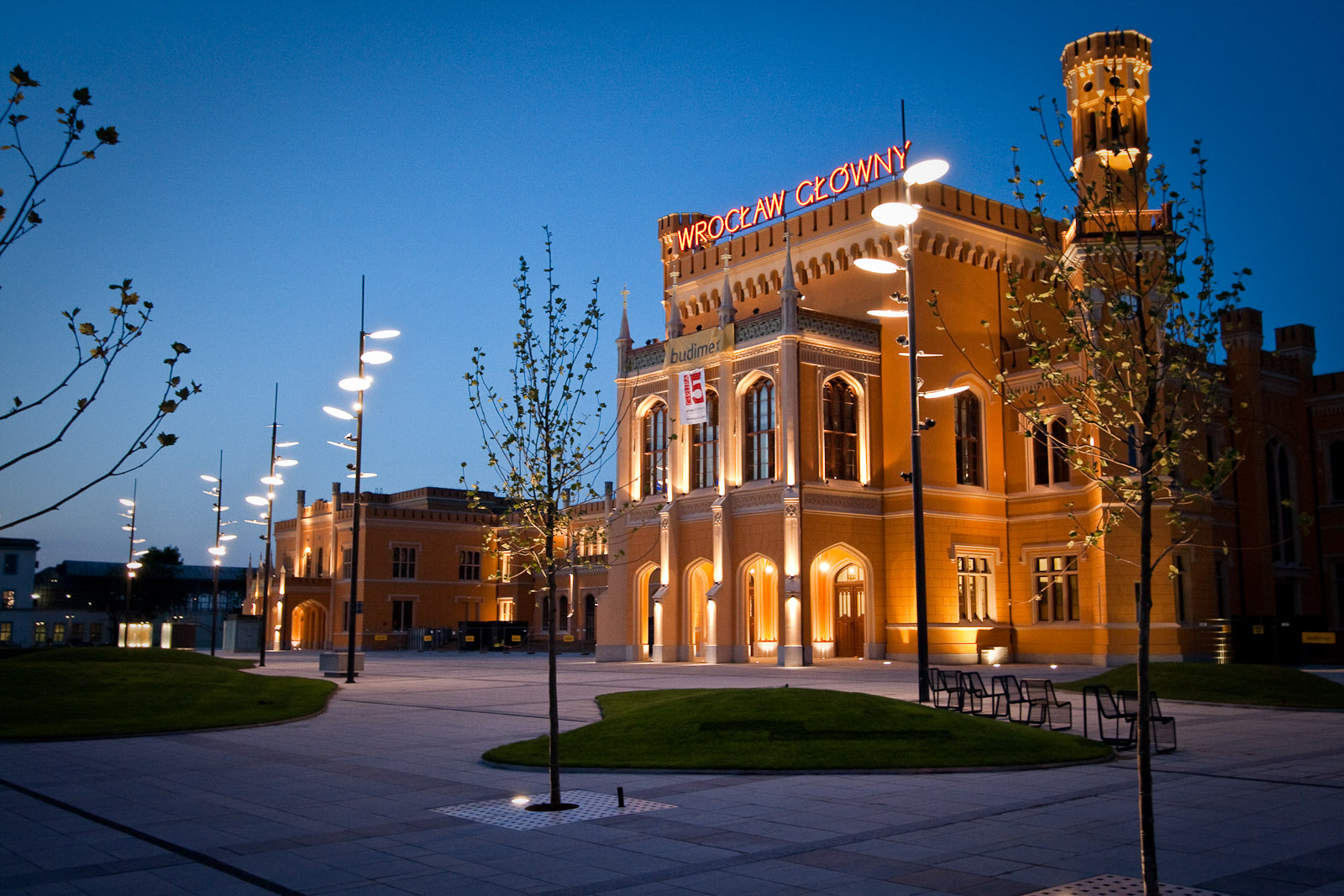
Wrocław Główny railway station is a major railway station in Lower Silesia

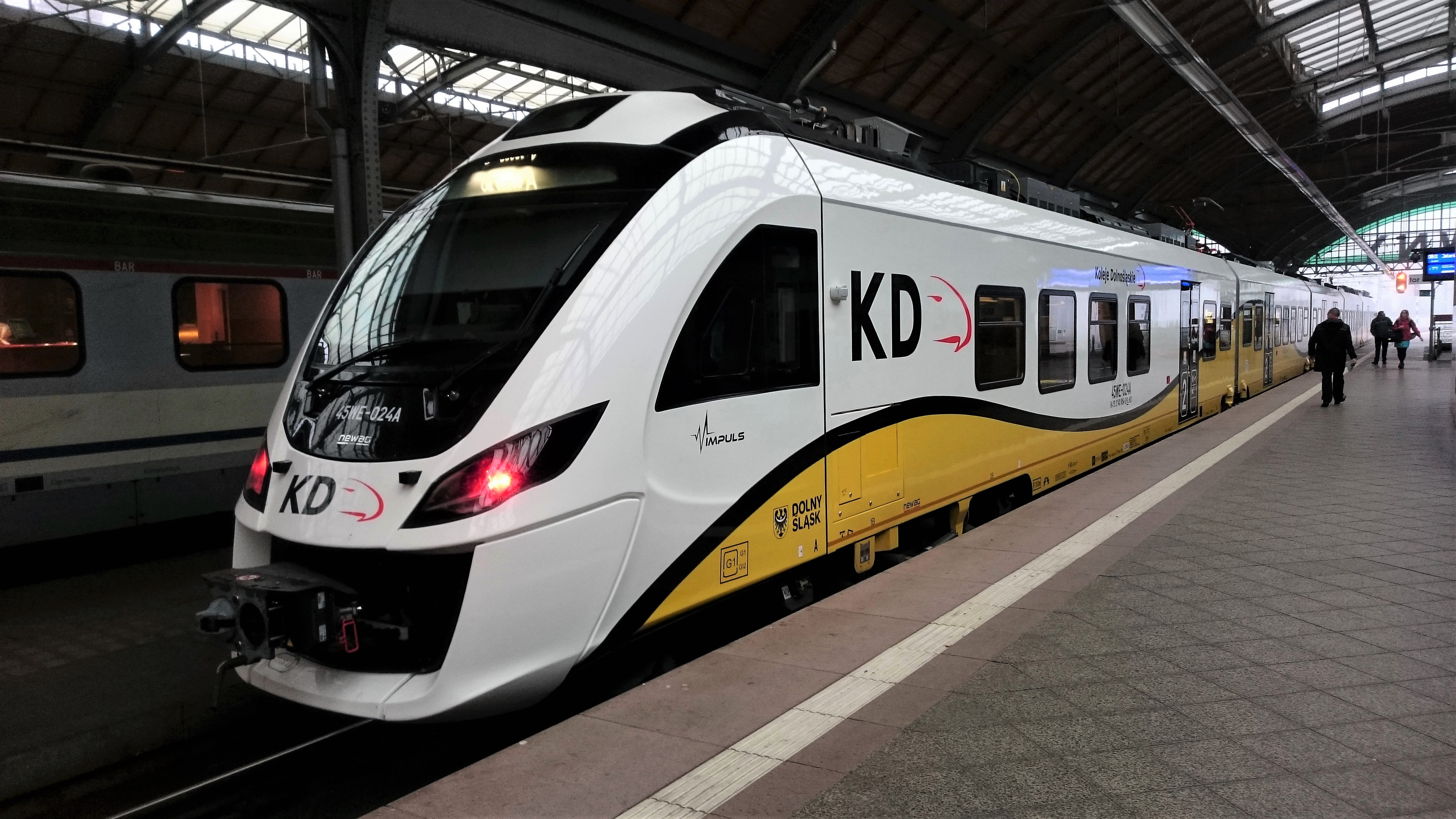
A Lower Silesian Railways train at Wrocław Główny

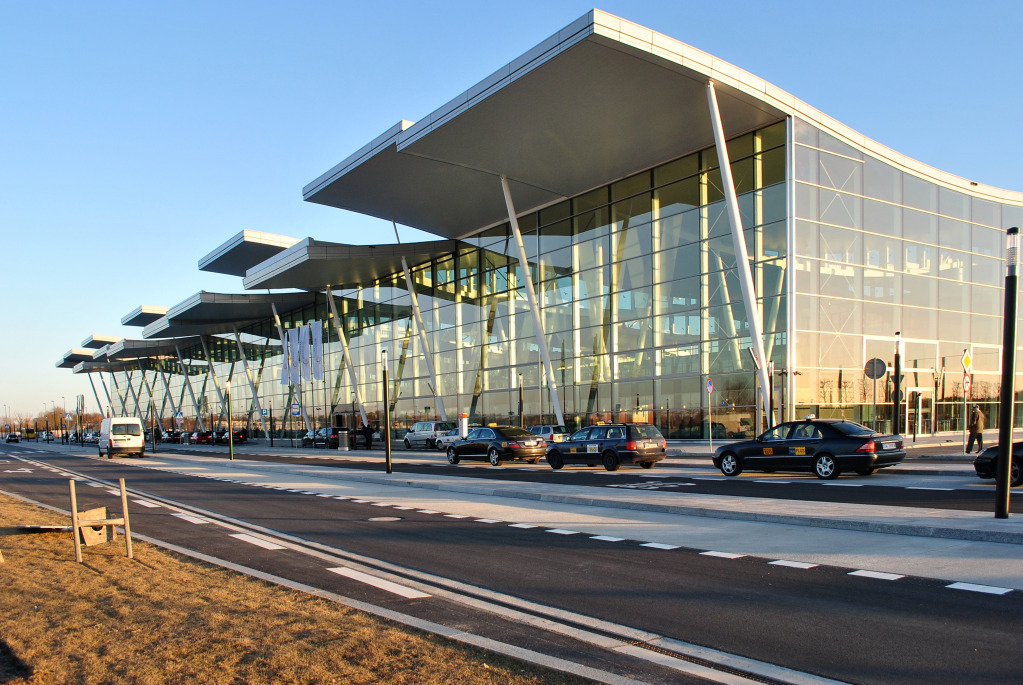
Wrocław Airport

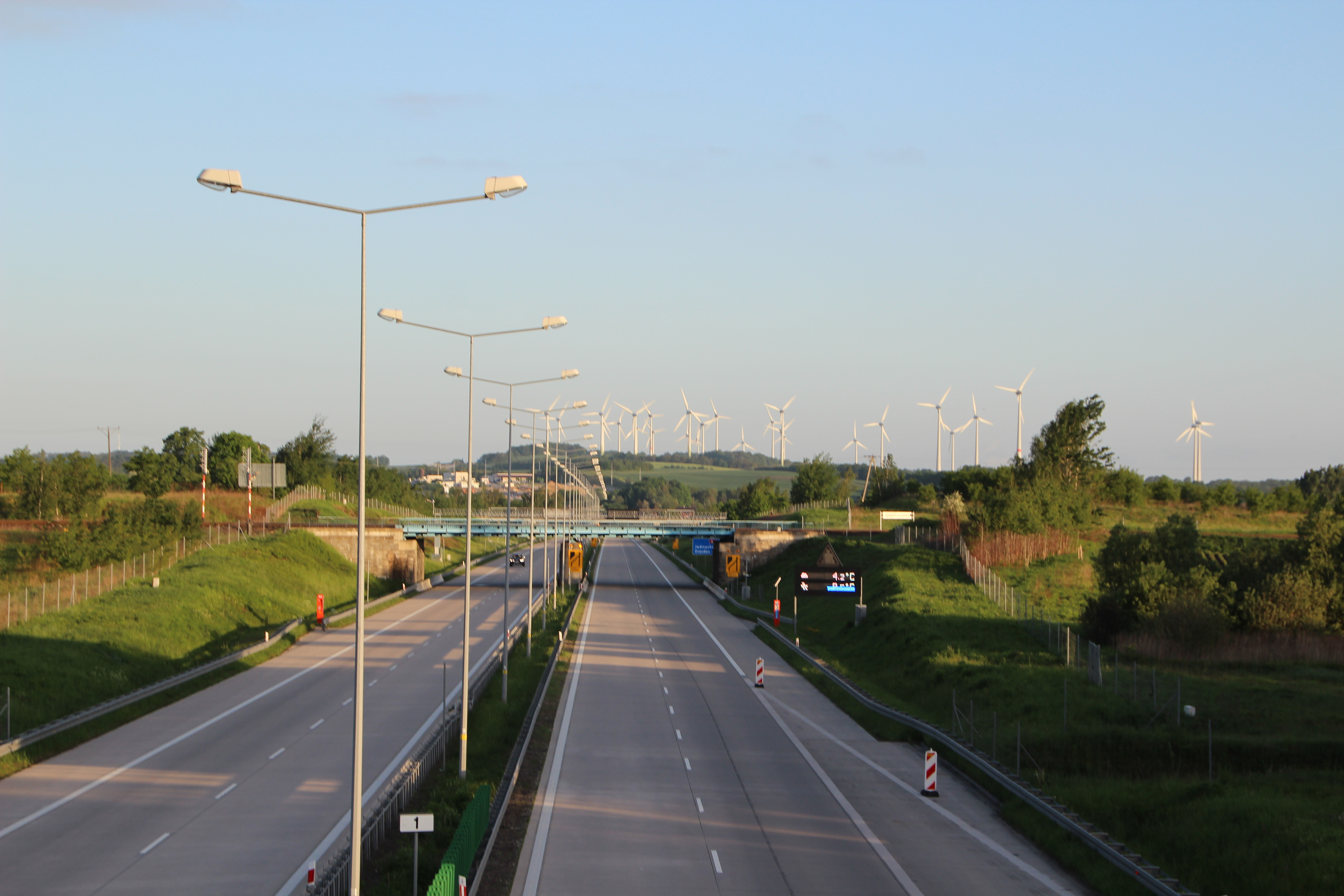
A4 motorway near Jędrzychowice

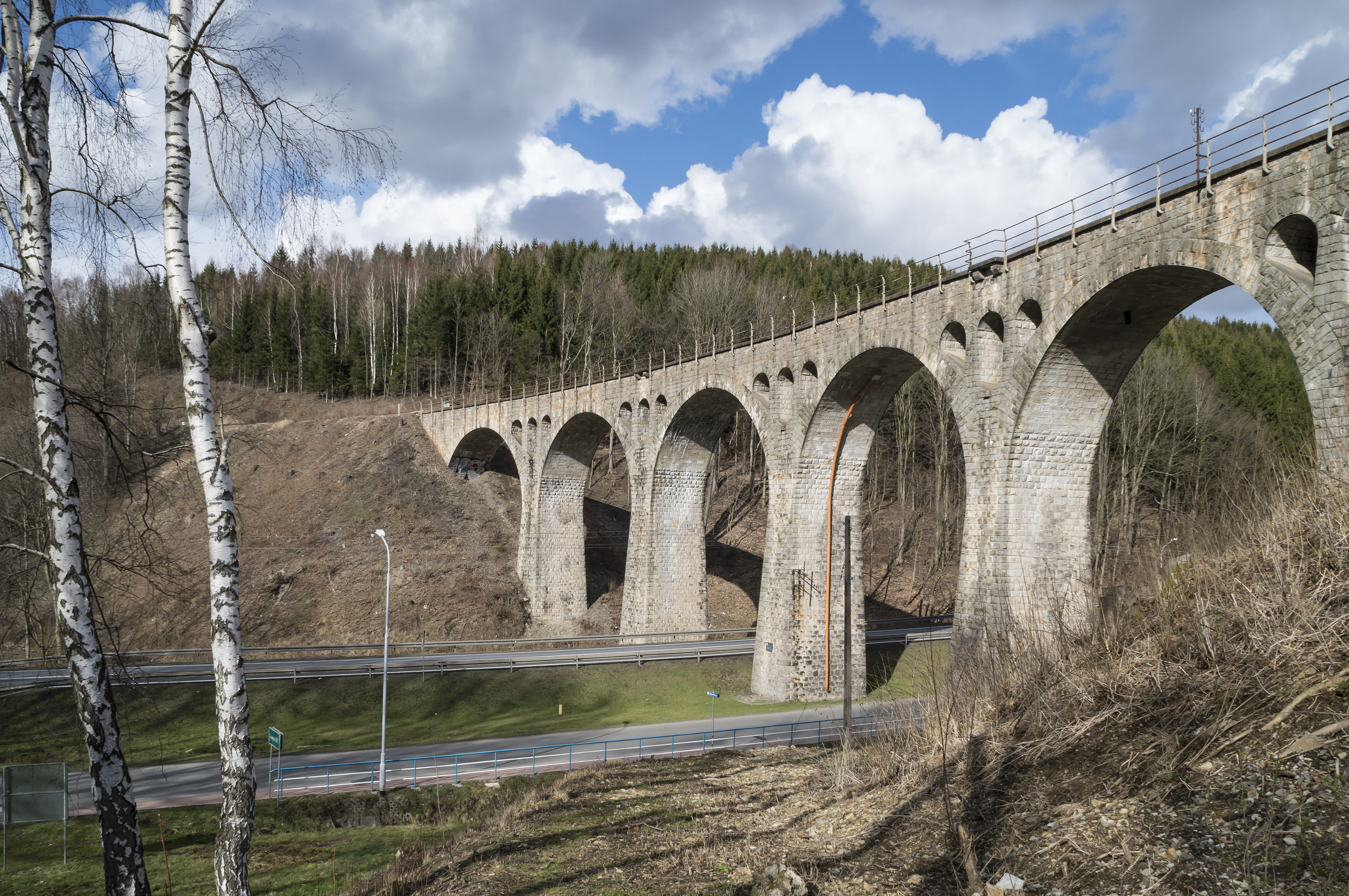
The viaduct in Lewin Kłodzki, on the Kłodzko Nowe–Kudowa-Zdrój railway

== Tourism ==
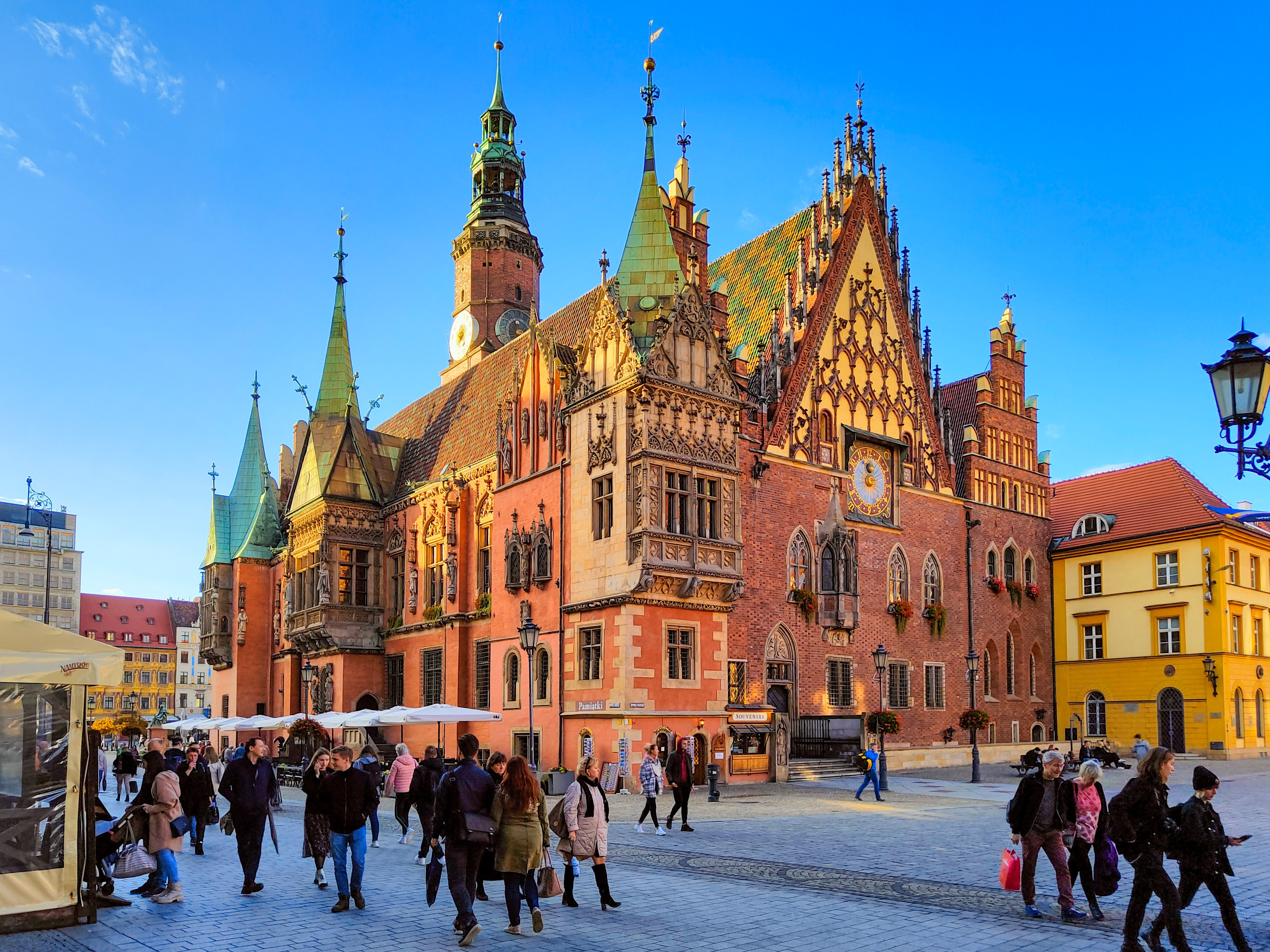
Wrocław Town Hall

Tourism is important for Lower Silesian Voivodeship. There are 99 castles and hundreds of palaces. A lot are located Jelenia Góra Valley.

Wrocław being the largest city in the voivodeship has many sights and attractions, including the Market Square, the Cathedral Island and Wrocław's dwarfs. The Festival of Good Beer is held every year of June.

The annual international Chopin Festival is held in the Fryderyk Chopin Theatre in the town of Duszniki-Zdrój. Other major attraction of the town is the Museum of Papermaking, established in a 17th-century paper mill.

Śnieżka is the highest peak of the Lower Silesian Voivodeship and the whole of the Sudetes.

Śnieżka - the highest peak of the Lower Silesian Voivodeship

The voivodeship contains 11 spa towns (Długopole-Zdrój, Duszniki-Zdrój, Jedlina-Zdrój, Kudowa-Zdrój, Lądek-Zdrój, Polanica-Zdrój, Przerzeczyn-Zdrój, Szczawno-Zdrój, Świeradów-Zdrój), more than any other province of Poland.

There are various museums, including the major National Museum in Wrocław with the branch Racławice Panorama Museum, and the Archdiocese Museum in Wrocław, which contains the Book of Henryków. Wrocław also hosts the Post and Telecommunications Museum, Poland's chief museum dedicated to postal history. The Regional Museum in Środa Śląska holds the Środa Treasure, containing medieval gold and silver coins, jewellery and royal regalia, considered one of the most precious archaeological findings of 20th-century Europe. The Ossolineum in Wrocław is a National Institute and Library of great importance, and the Pan Tadeusz Museum, containing the manuscript of the Polish national epos, Pan Tadeusz by Adam Mickiewicz, serves as its branch. Bolesławiec, center of pottery production since the Middle Ages, hosts the Museum of Ceramics. The former gold mines in Złoty Stok and Złotoryja, tin and cobalt mine in Krobica, nickel mine in Szklary, coal mine in Nowa Ruda and uranium ore mine in Kowary are available for tourists. There is also an underground tourist route in historic cellars under the old town of Kłodzko.

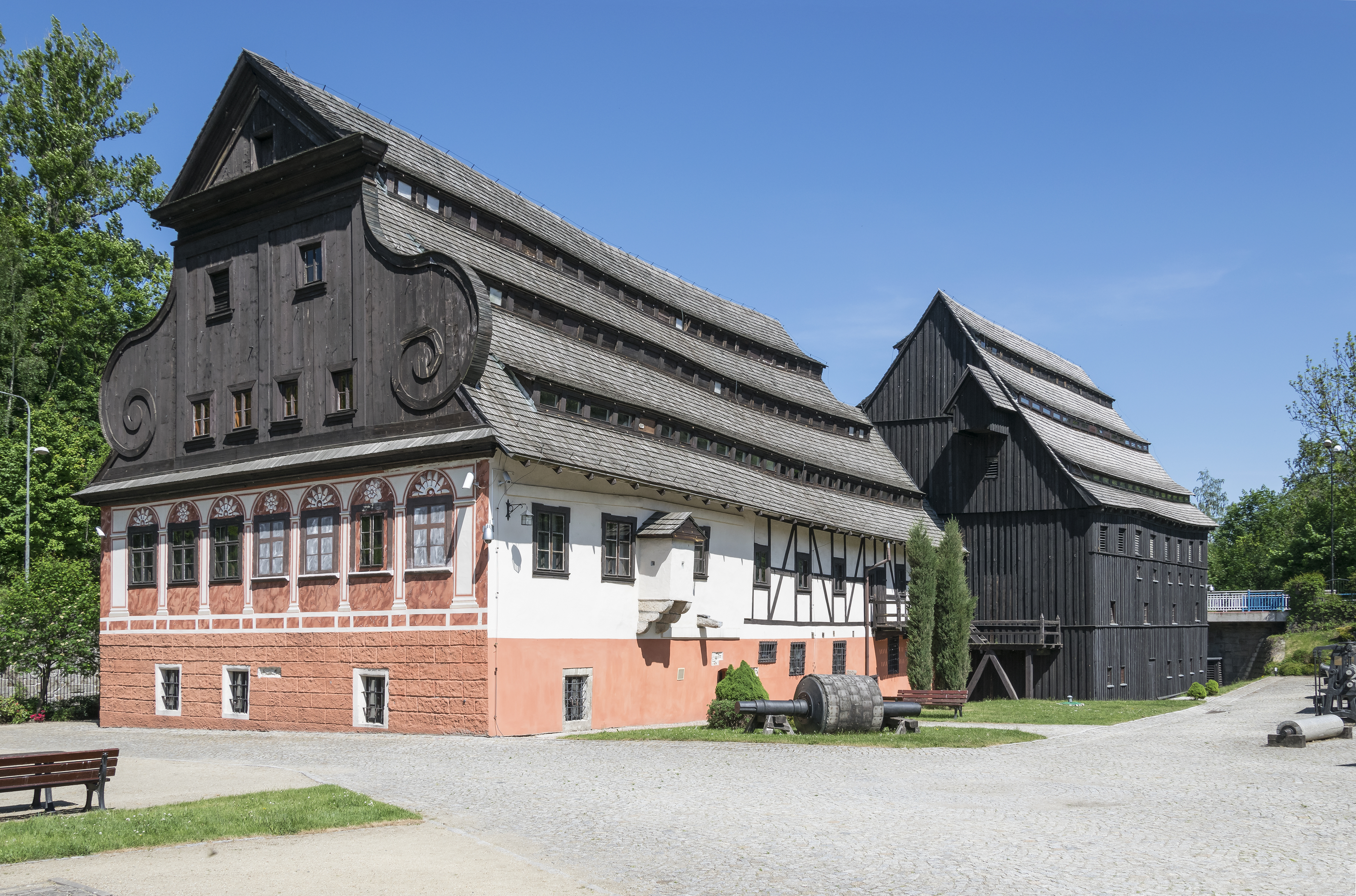
Museum of Papermaking in Duszniki-Zdrój

Lower Silesia boasts three World Heritage Sites and 16 Historic Monuments of Poland:

- Churches of Peace in Jawor and Świdnica (listed as both)
- Centennial Hall in Wrocław (listed as both)
- Museum of Papermaking in Duszniki-Zdrój (also inscribed on the tentative list of World Heritage Sites)
- Palace and landscape parks of the Jelenia Góra Valley
- Abbey and palace and park ensemble in Kamieniec Ząbkowicki
- Baroque Krzeszów Abbey, which hosts the Icon of Our Lady of Grace, the oldest Marian icon in Poland and one of the oldest in Europe; one of the burial sites of the Piast dynasty
- Książ Castle and Park ensemble
- Baroque Benedictine Abbey and St. Jadwiga's Basilica, Legnickie Pole
- Fort Srebrna Góra
- Gothic Saints Peter and Paul Basilica, Strzegom
- Gothic Świdnica Cathedral
- Former Cistercian Abbey and Sanctuary of St. Jadwiga, Trzebnica, one of the burial sites of the Piast dynasty
- Old Town of Wrocław
- Romanesque-Gothic Saint George church in Ziębice
- Gothic-Mannerist Holy Trinity church in Żórawina

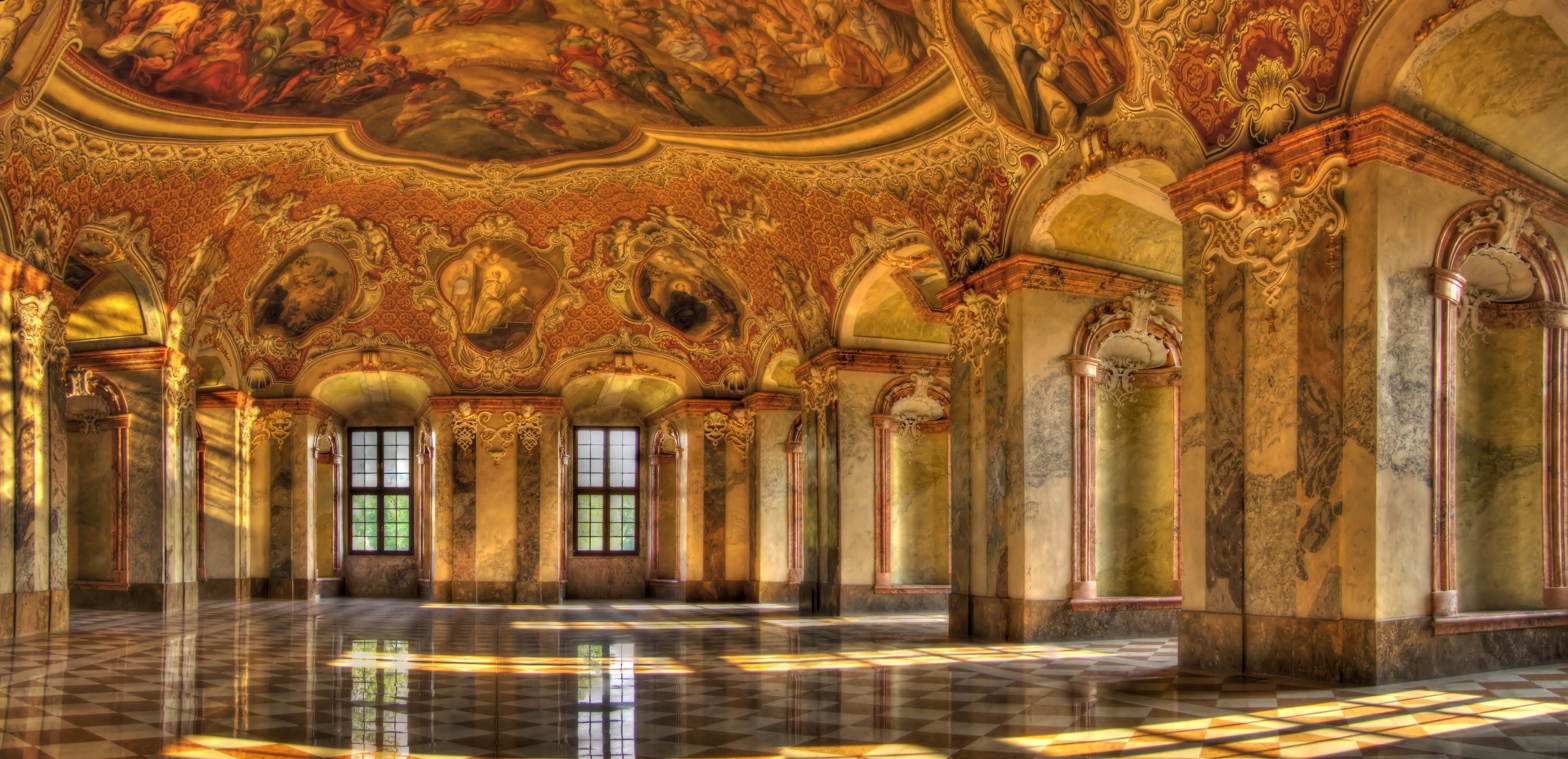
Main refectory of the Lubiąż Abbey

There are several burial sites of Polish monarchs and dukes from the Piast dynasty, including at Henryków, Lubiąż, Trzebnica, and several in Legnica and Wrocław. The Basilica of the Assumption of the Blessed Virgin Mary in Krzeszów and Church of St. John the Baptist in Legnica contain entire Baroque mausoleums of the Piast dukes from the Świdnica and Legnica lines, respectively.

Other rather unique historic structures include the Skull Chapel in Kudowa-Zdrój and the Vang Stave Church in Karpacz. The Ducal Tower in Siedlęcin contains one of the best preserved medieval frescos in Poland, and the world's only in situ depiction of Sir Lancelot.

World War II sites include the museum at the former Nazi German Gross-Rosen concentration camp and memorials at the sites of other Nazi camps and prisons, at the sites of Nazi massacres, and to the Polish resistance movement, etc. A portion of the underground structures built as part of the unfinished Nazi German Project Riese is available for tourists. One of the largest war cemeteries in Poland, of the Second Polish Army from World War II, is located in Zgorzelec. One of the few Italian war cemeteries in Poland is located in Wrocław (from World War I), and there is also a mass grave of Italian soldiers from World War II in Bolesławiec (see also Italy–Poland relations).

There are also the Kłodzko and Srebrna Góra fortresses, which initially served for military purposes, and during World War II as German prisons for prisoners of various nationalities, especially Polish.

Castles and palaces (examples)

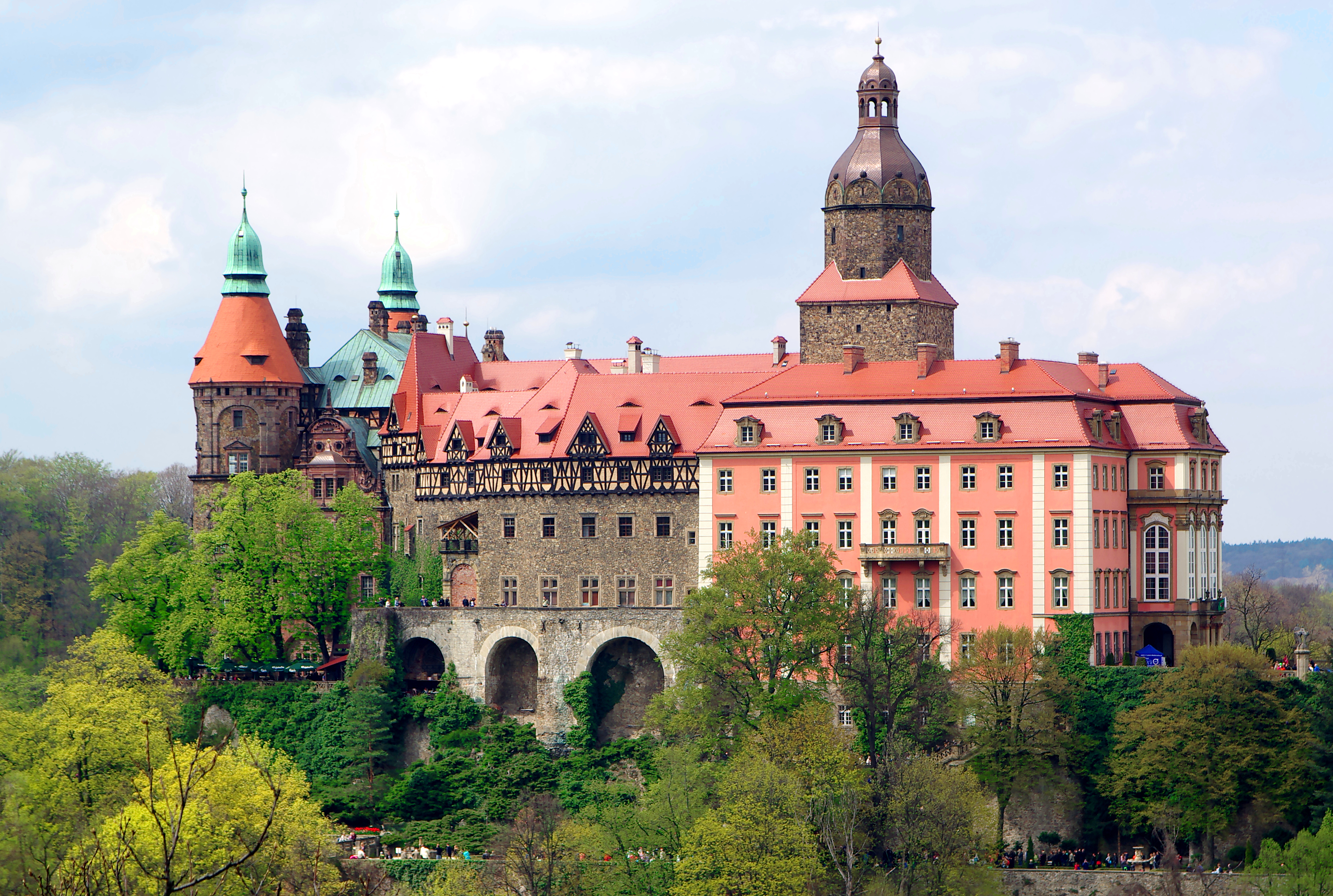
Książ Castle in Wałbrzych

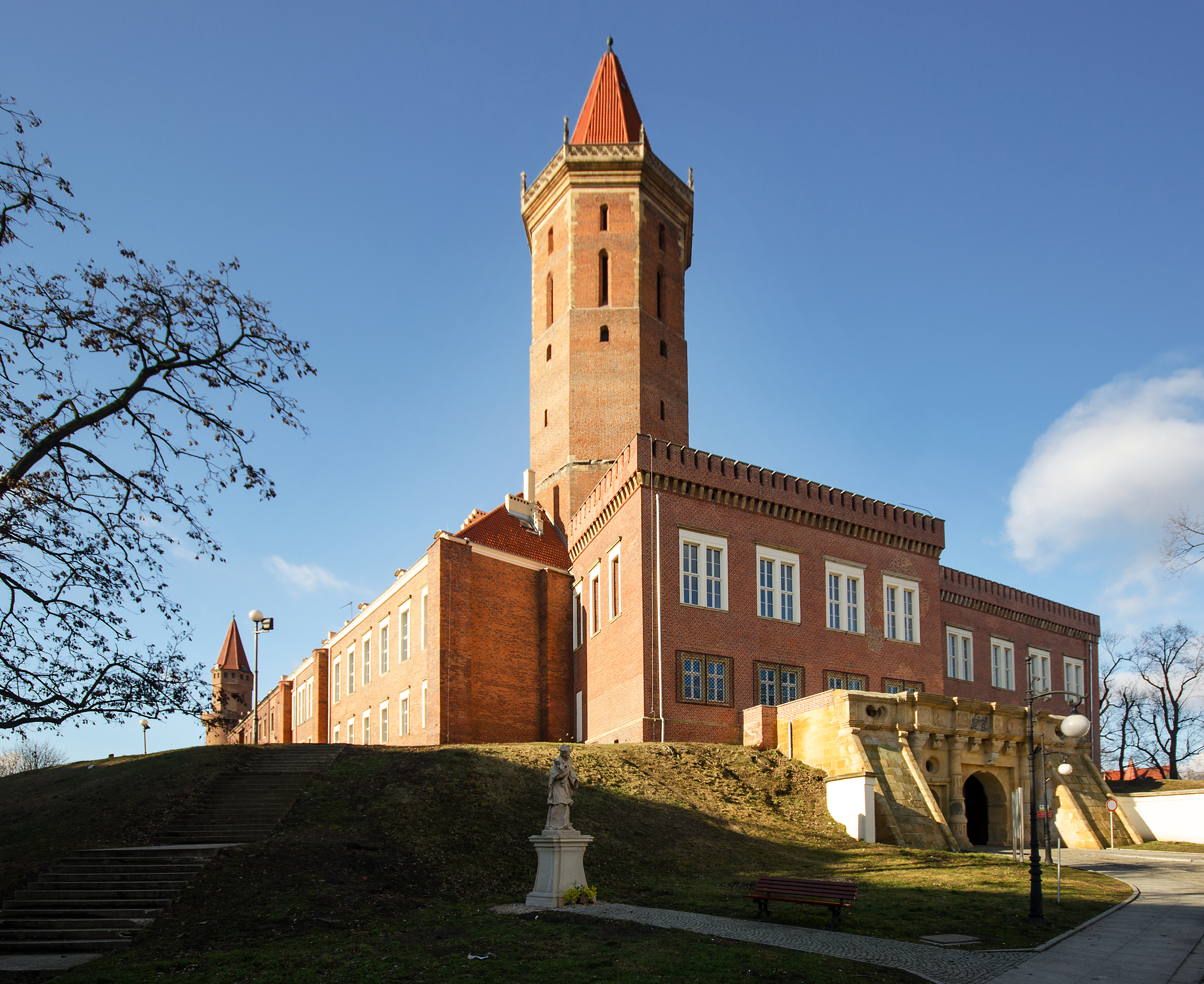
Piast Castle in Legnica

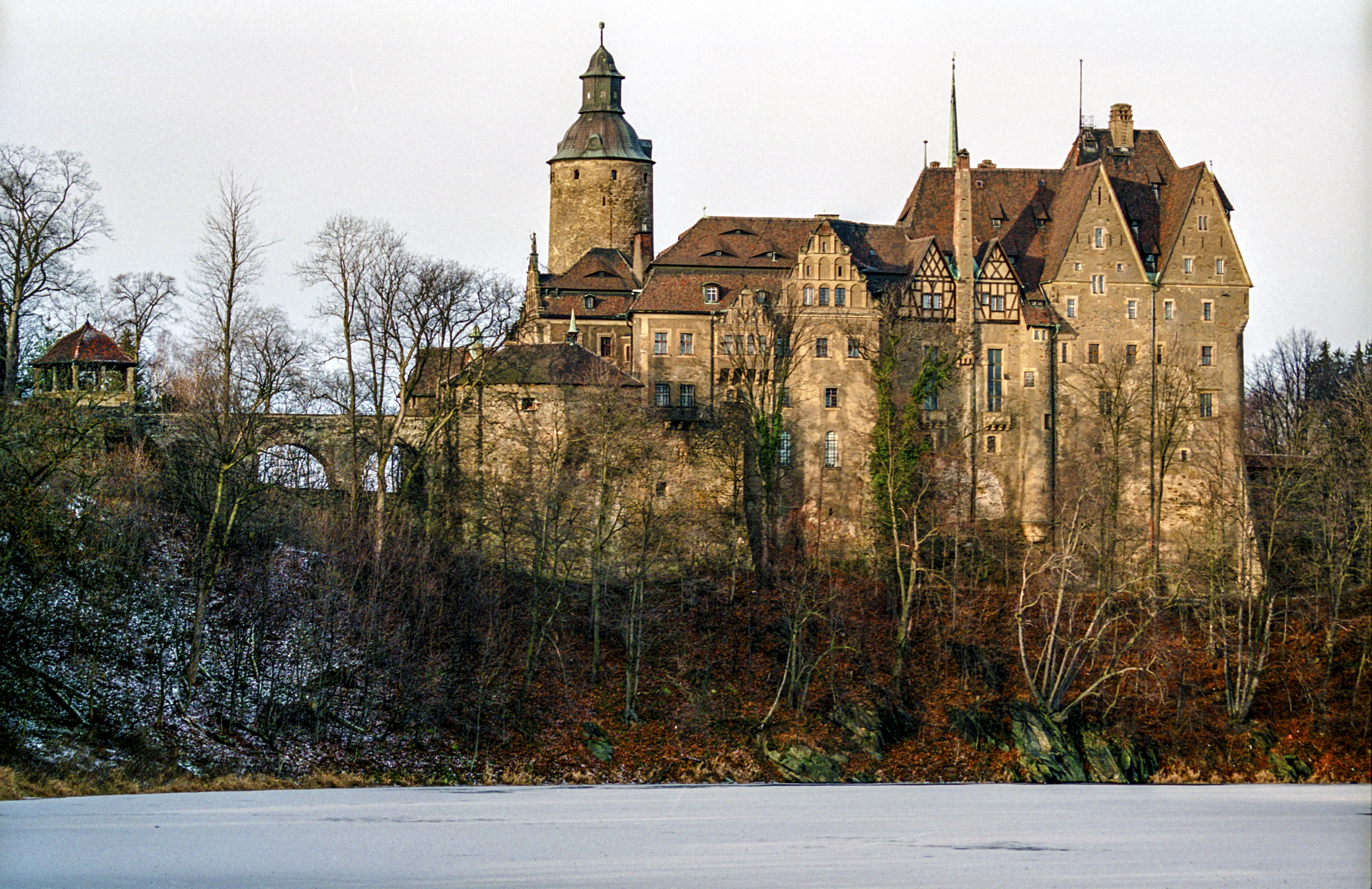
Czocha Castle

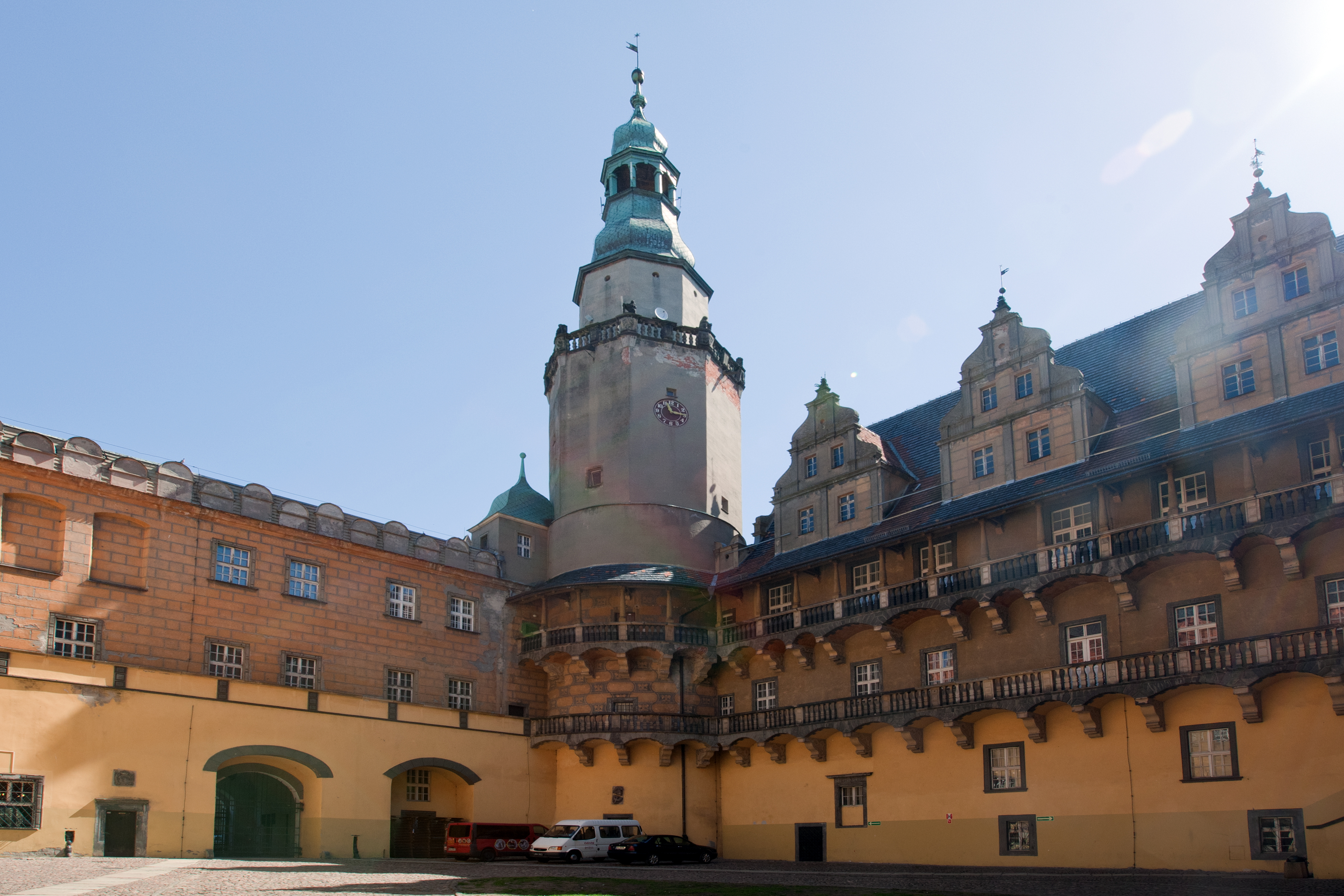
Oleśnica Castle

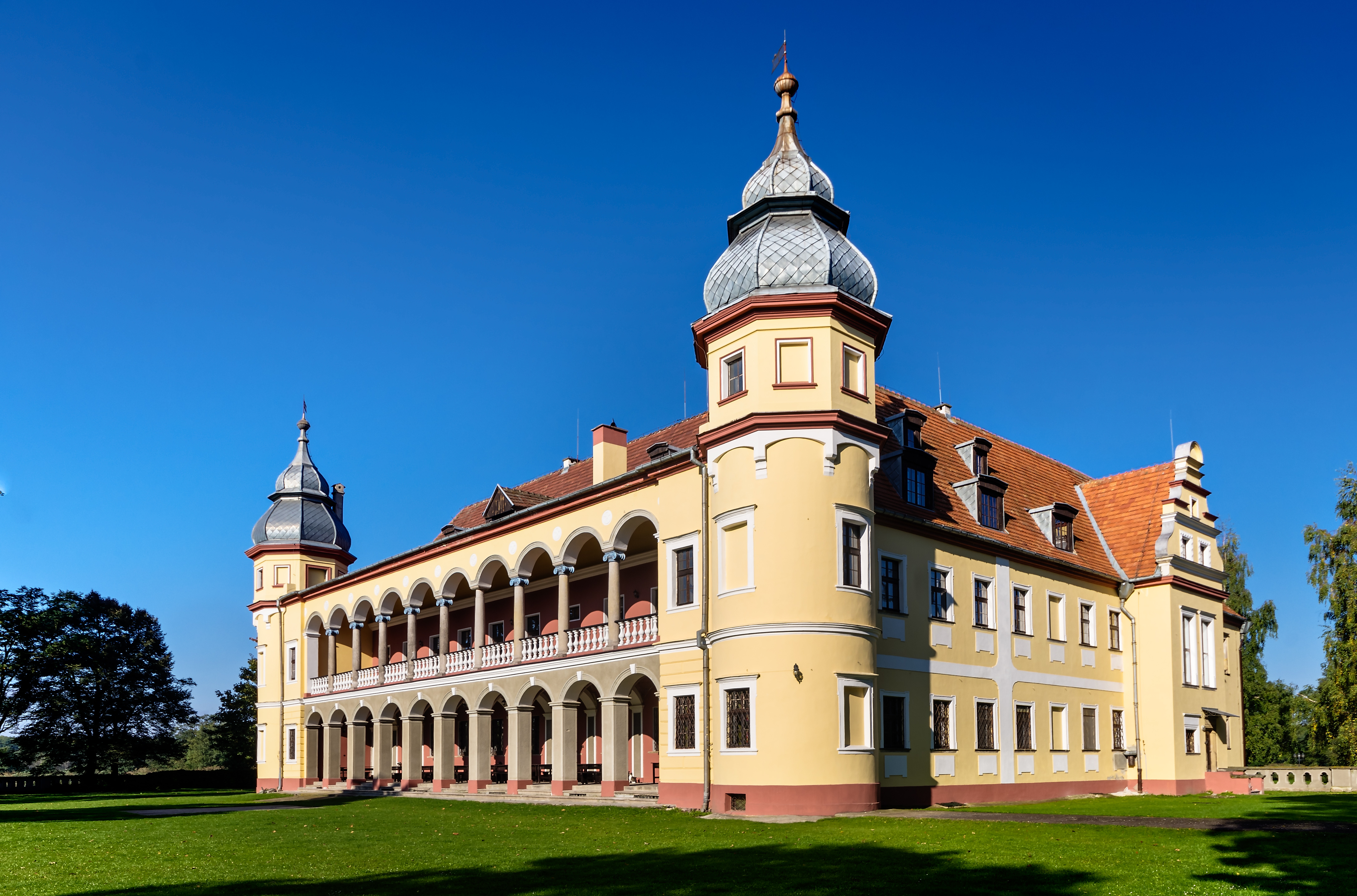
Krobielowice Palace

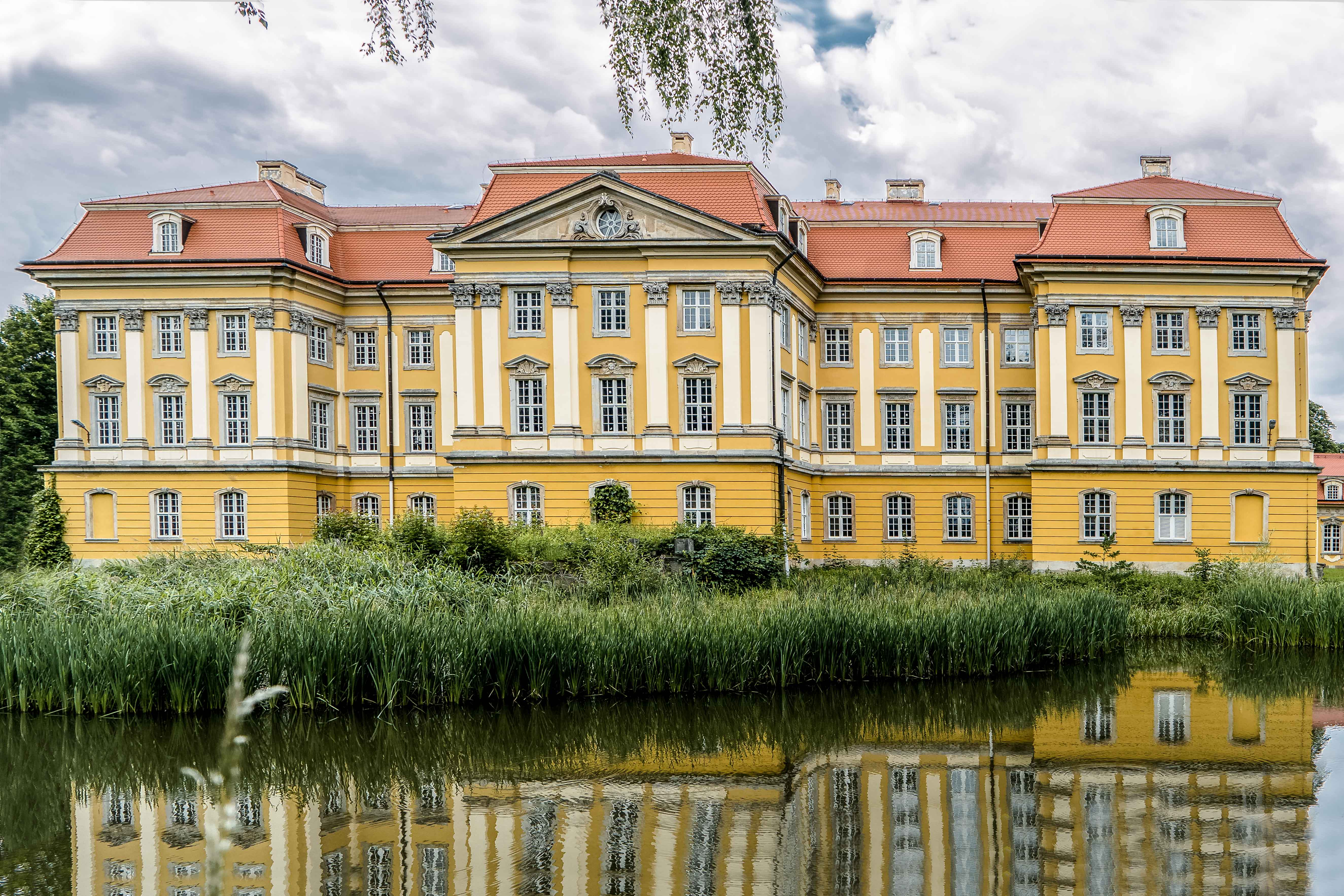
Radomierzyce Palace

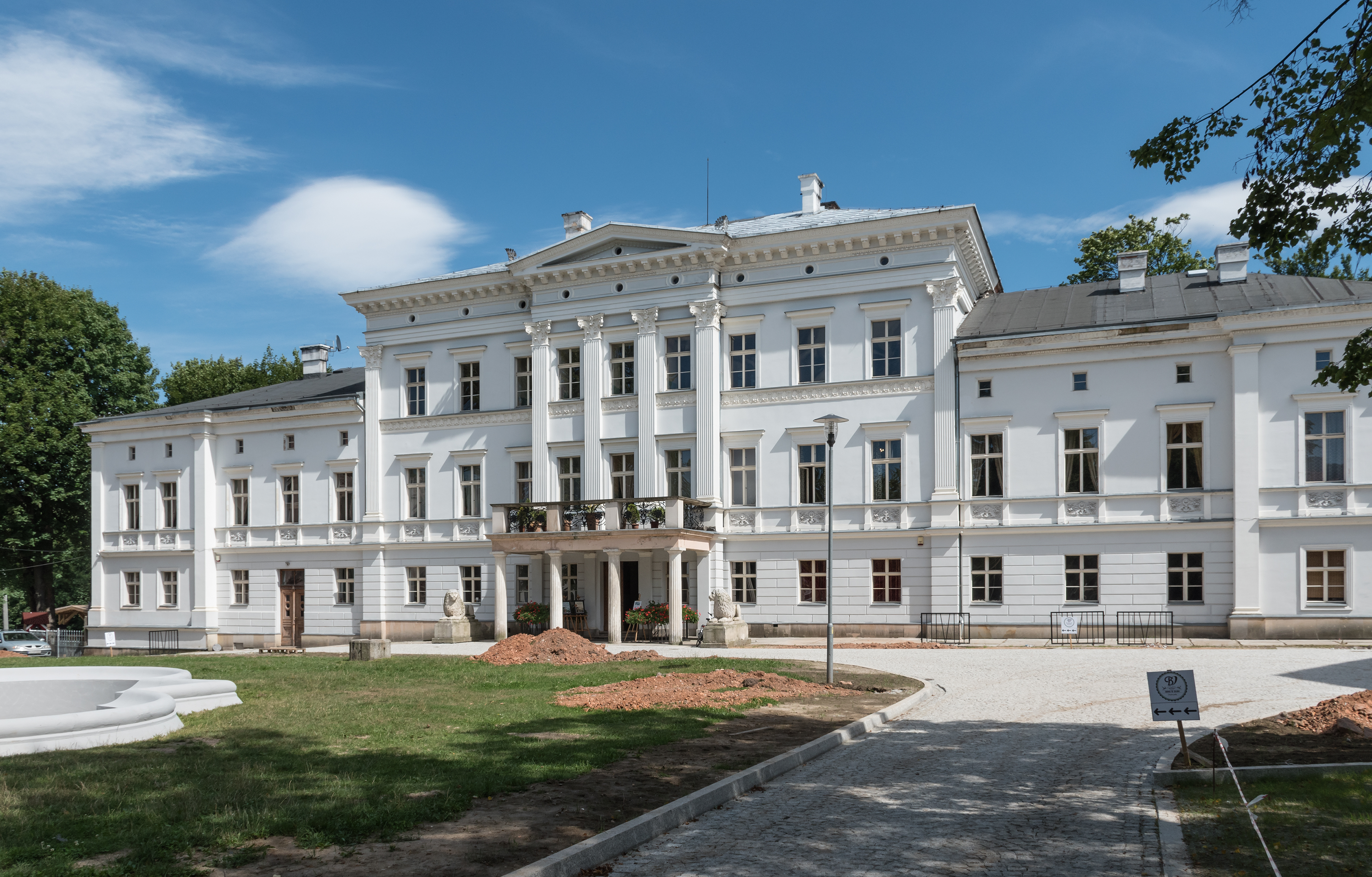
Jedlinka Palace in Jedlina-Zdrój

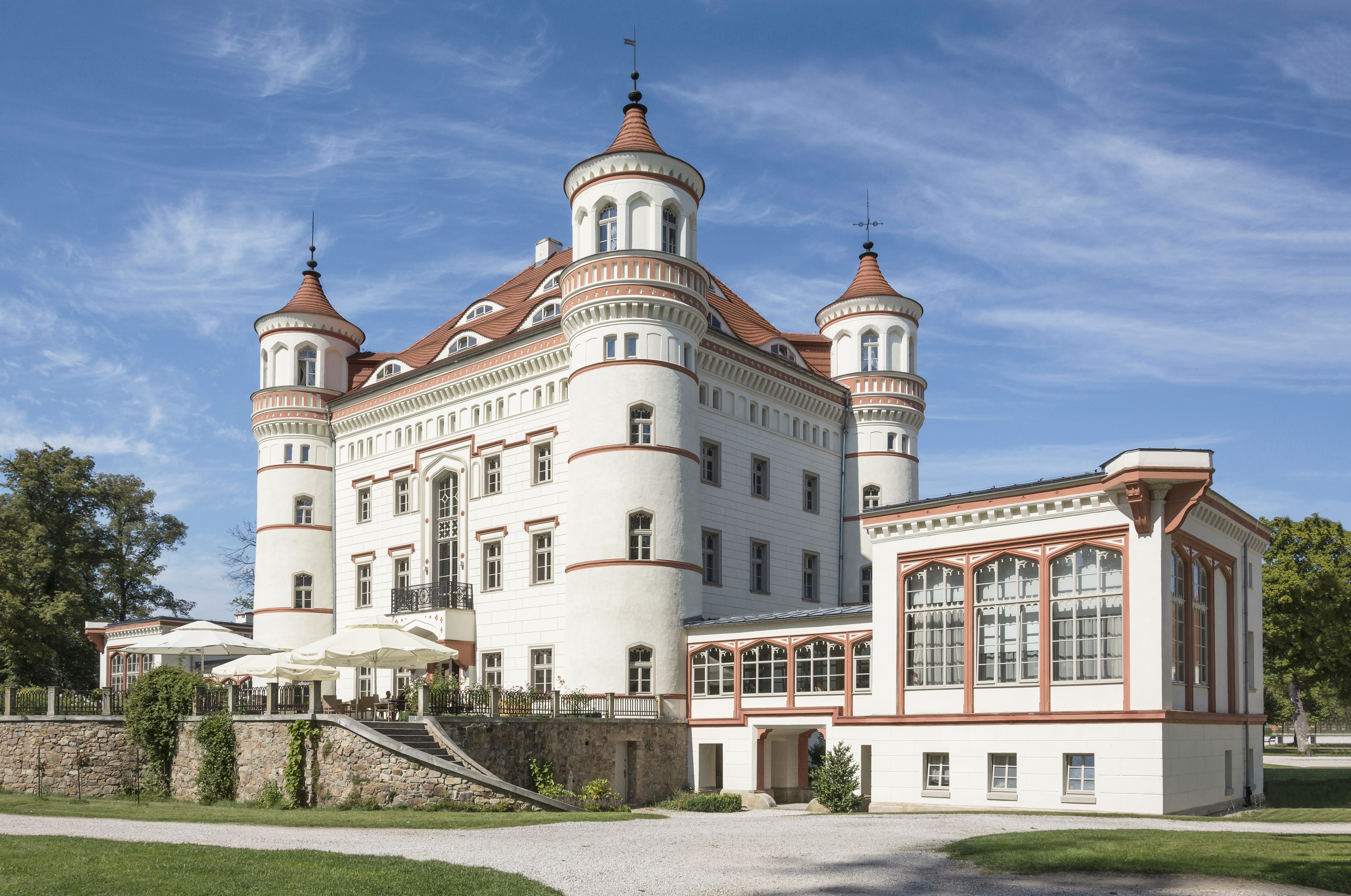
Wojanów Palace

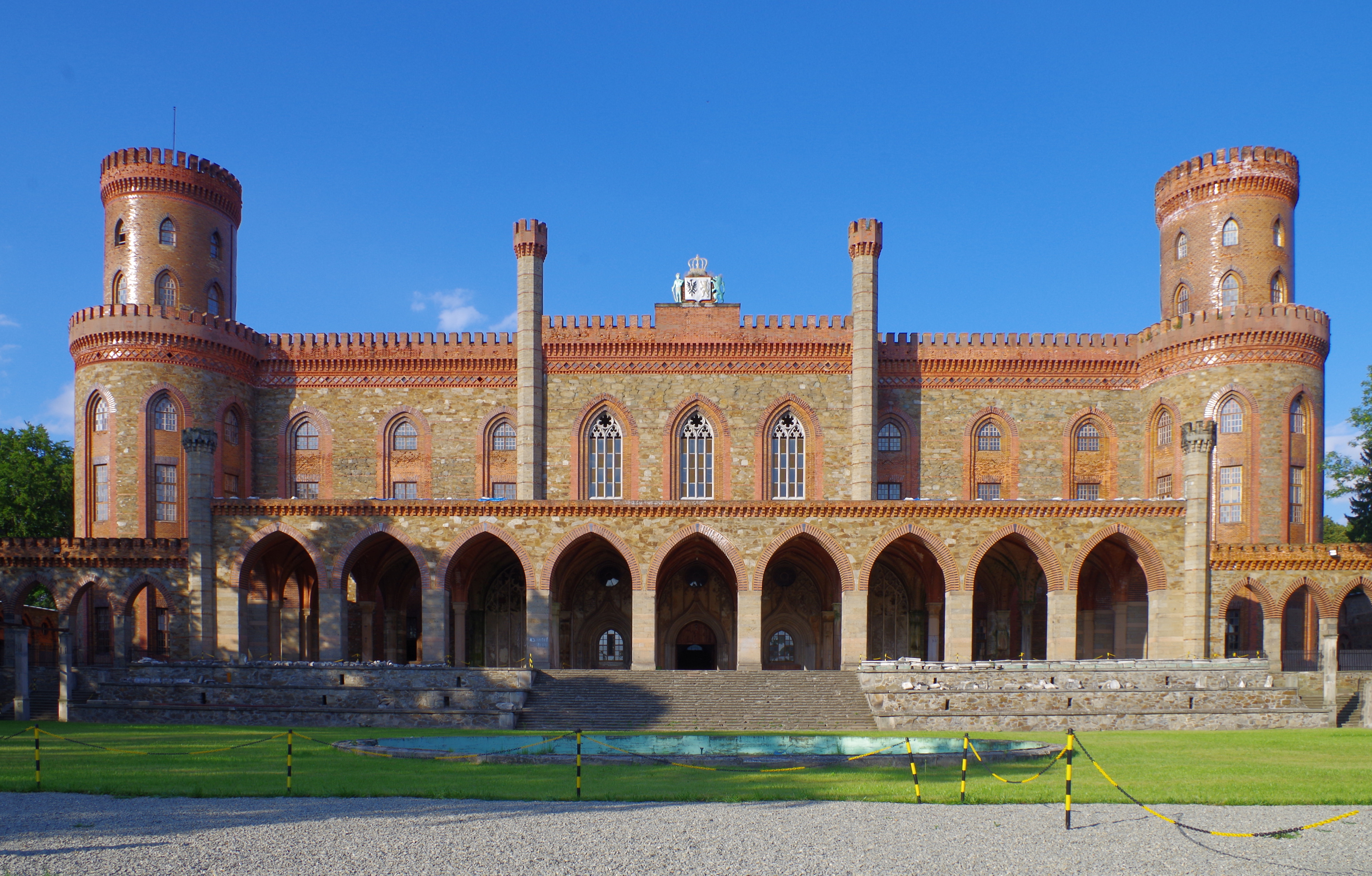
Kamieniec Ząbkowicki Palace

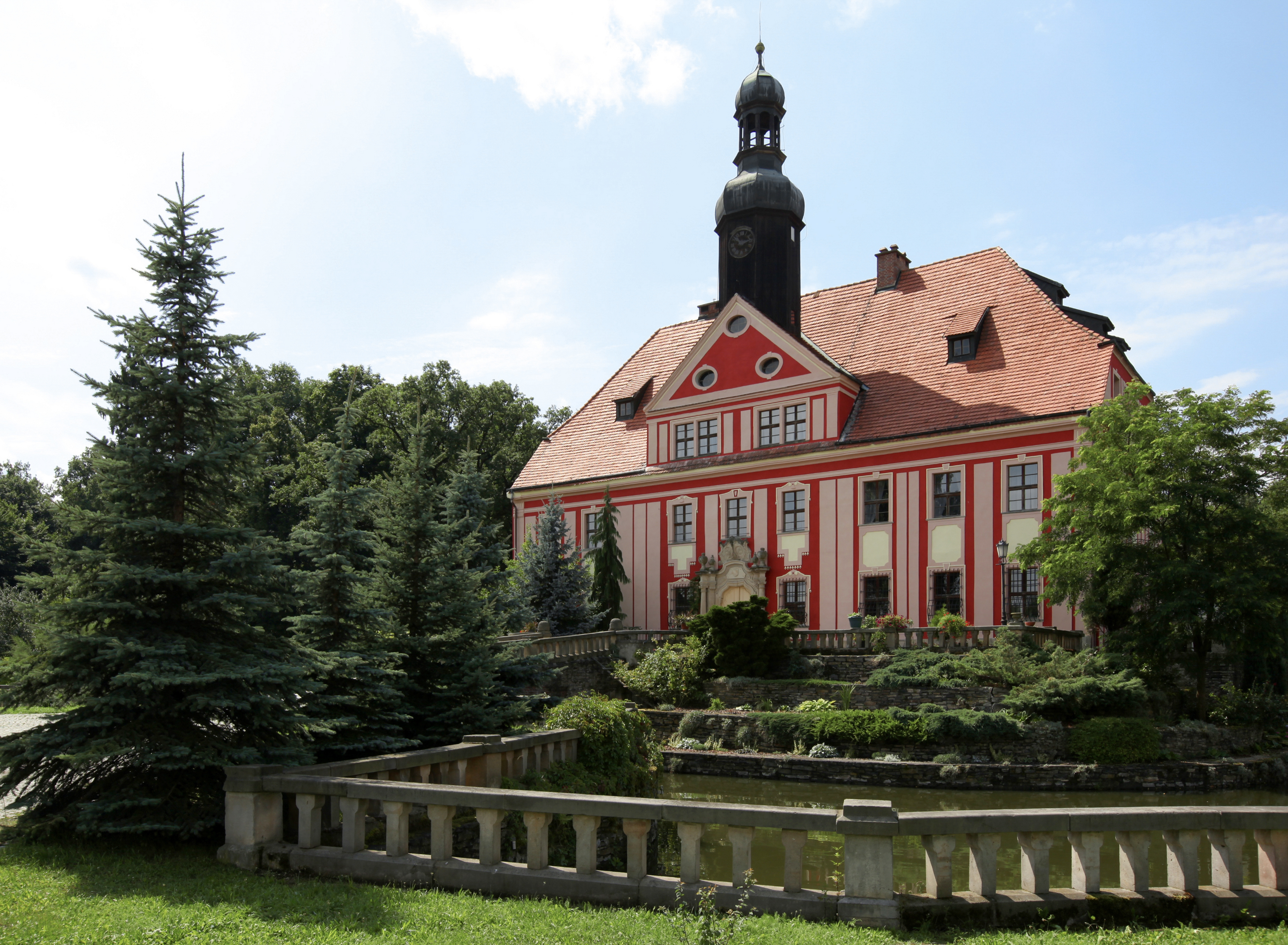
Warmątowice Sienkiewiczowskie Palace
Burial sites of Polish monarchs and consorts

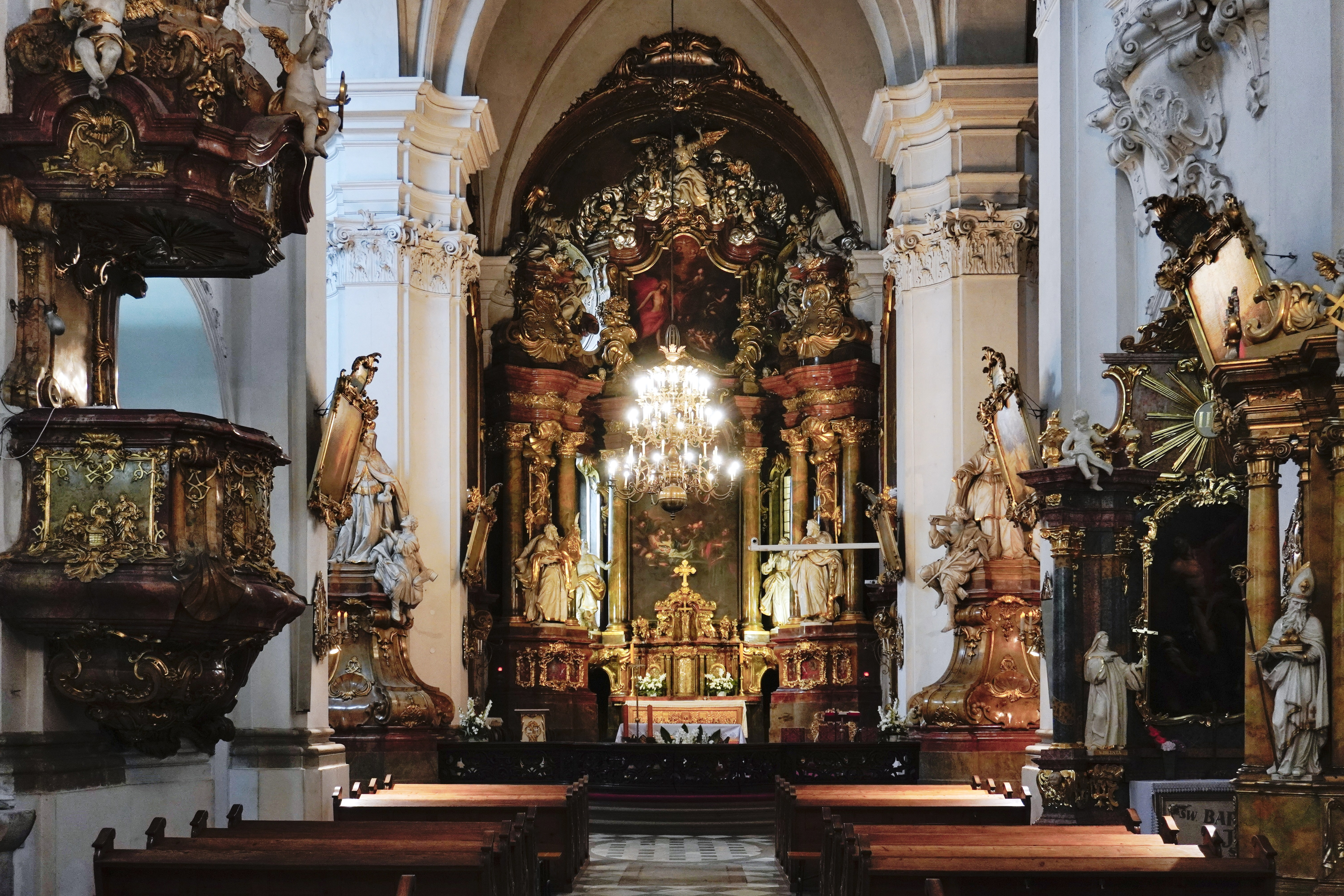
Sanctuary of St. Jadwiga, Trzebnica

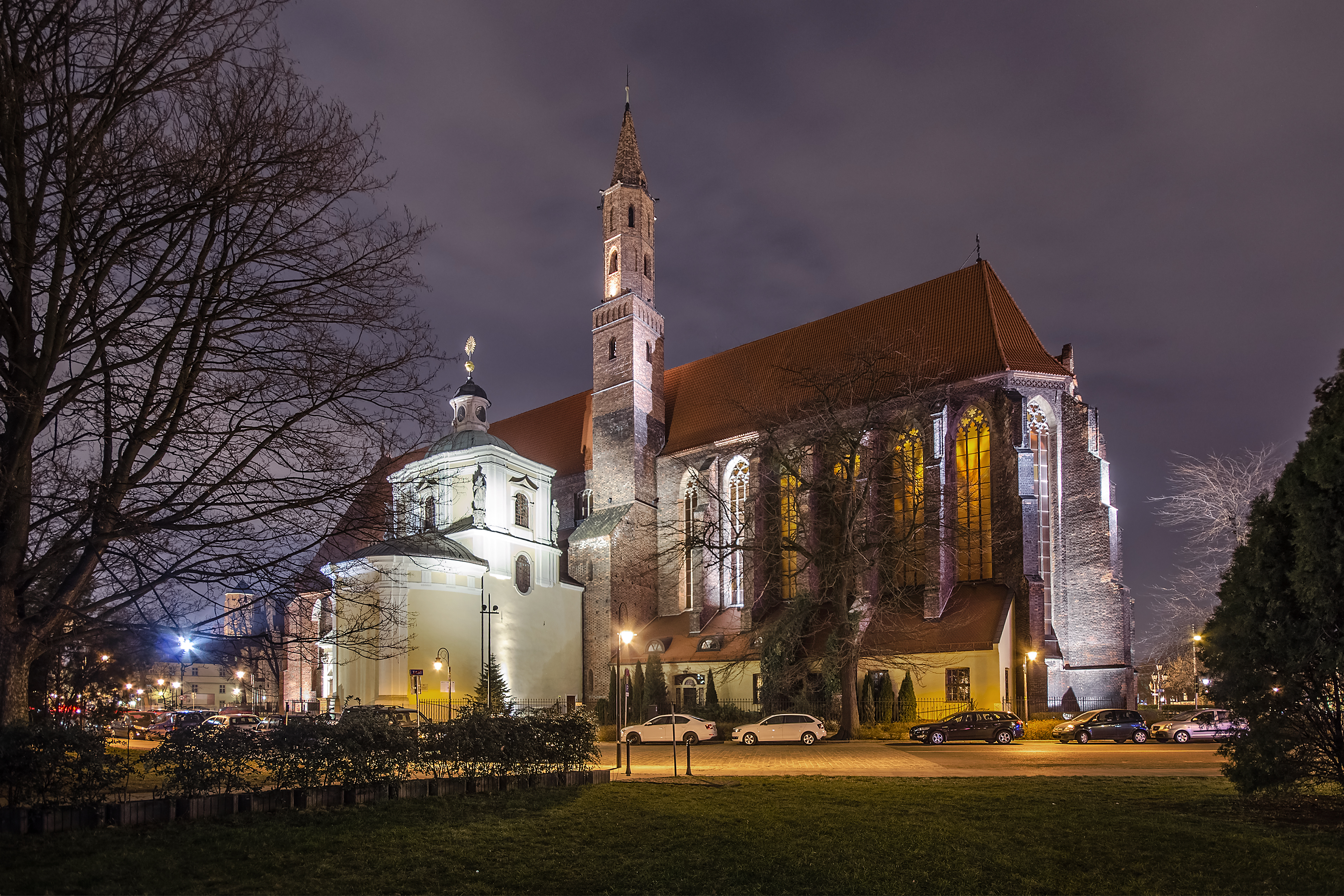
Cathedral of St. Vincent and St. James, Wrocław

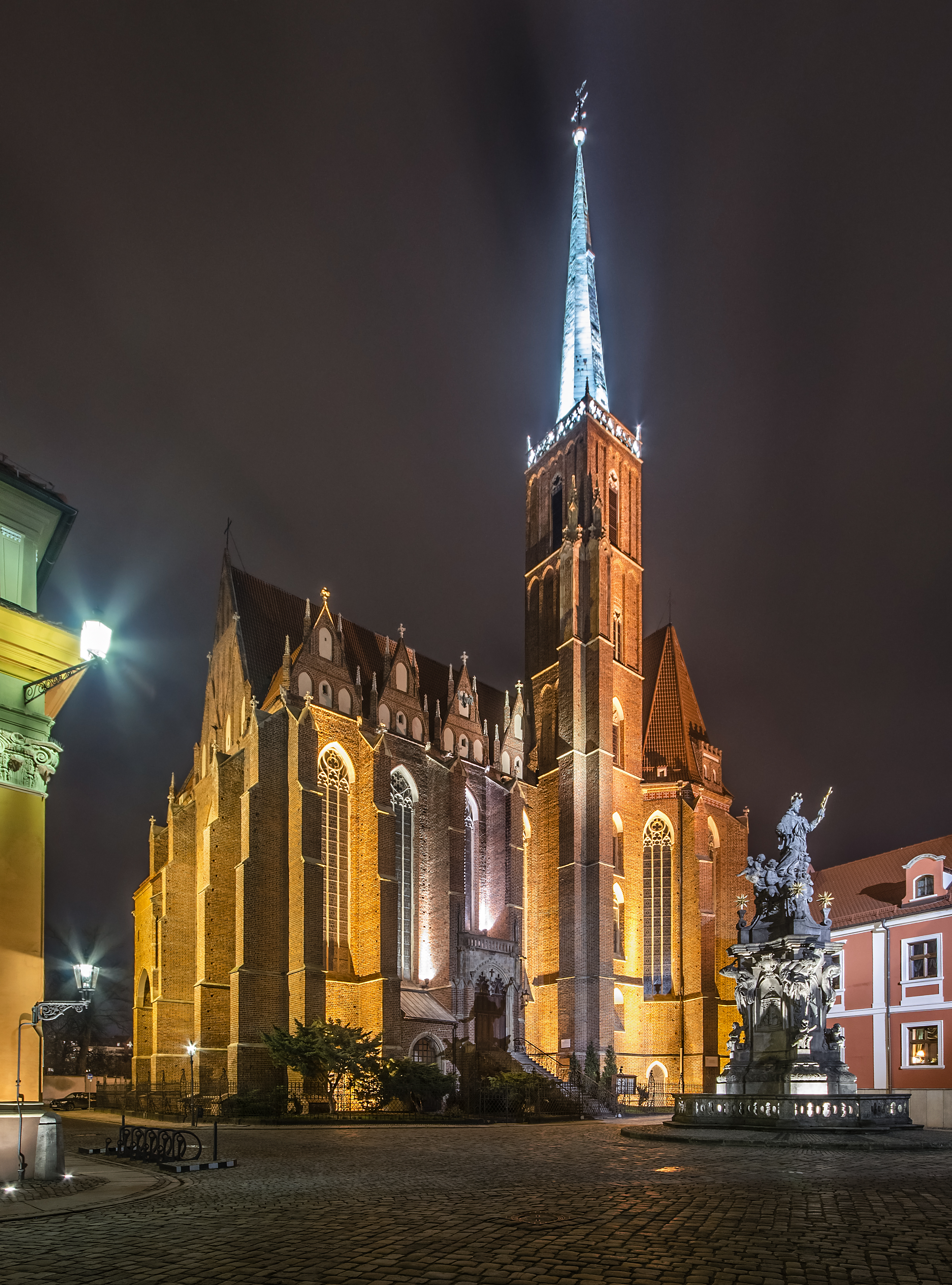
Holy Cross Church, whose scholastic was Nicolaus Copernicus

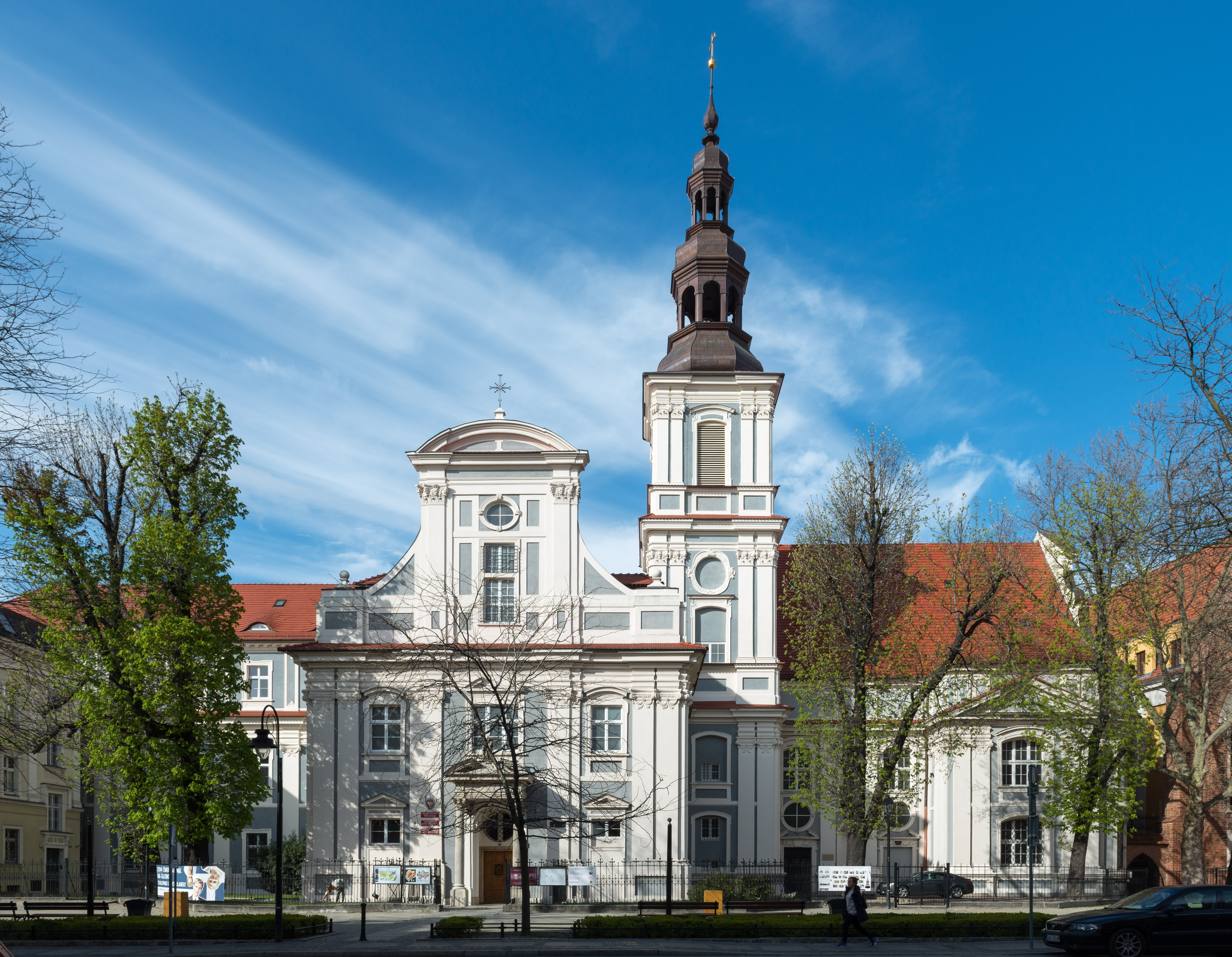
Church of St. Clare and Hedwig church, Wrocław

=== Protected areas ===
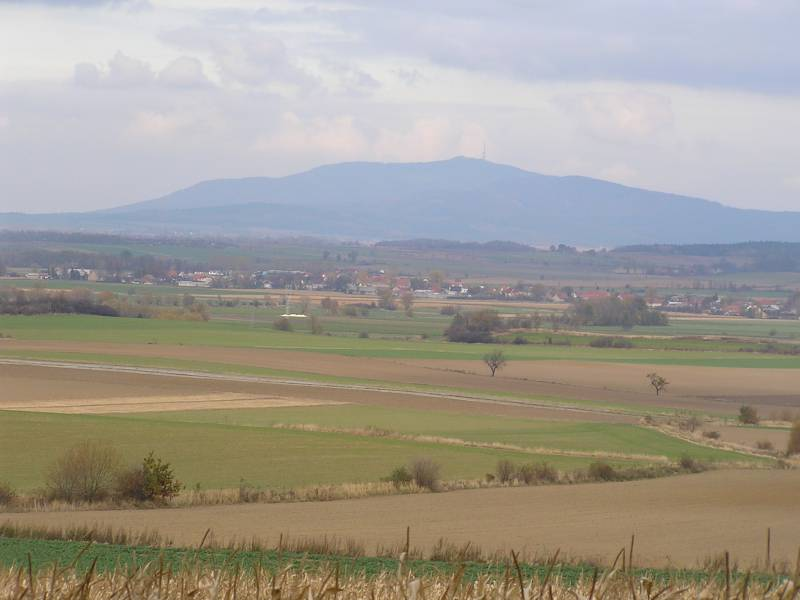
Mount Ślęża

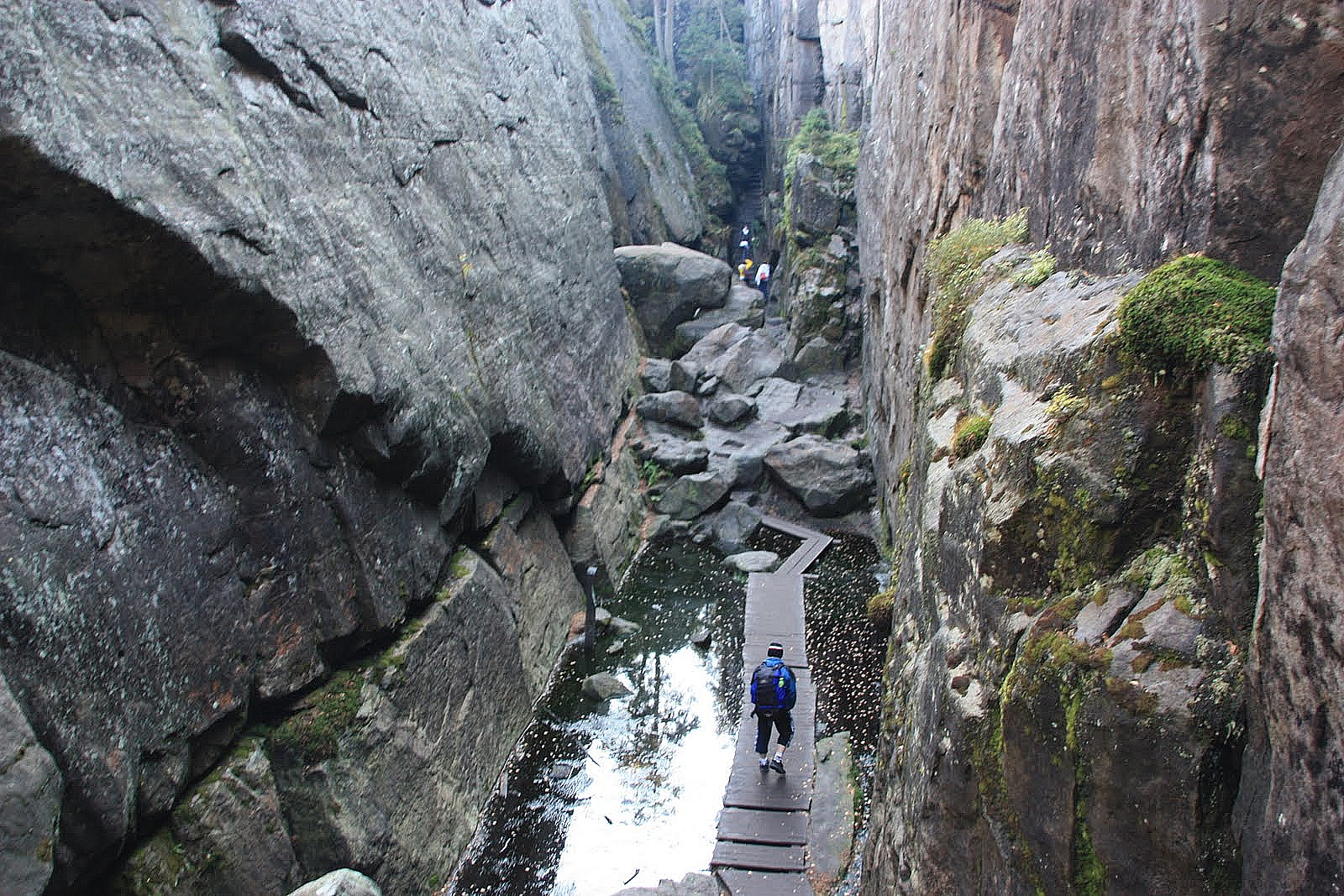
"Hell" on Szczeliniec Wielki (Table Mountains National Park)

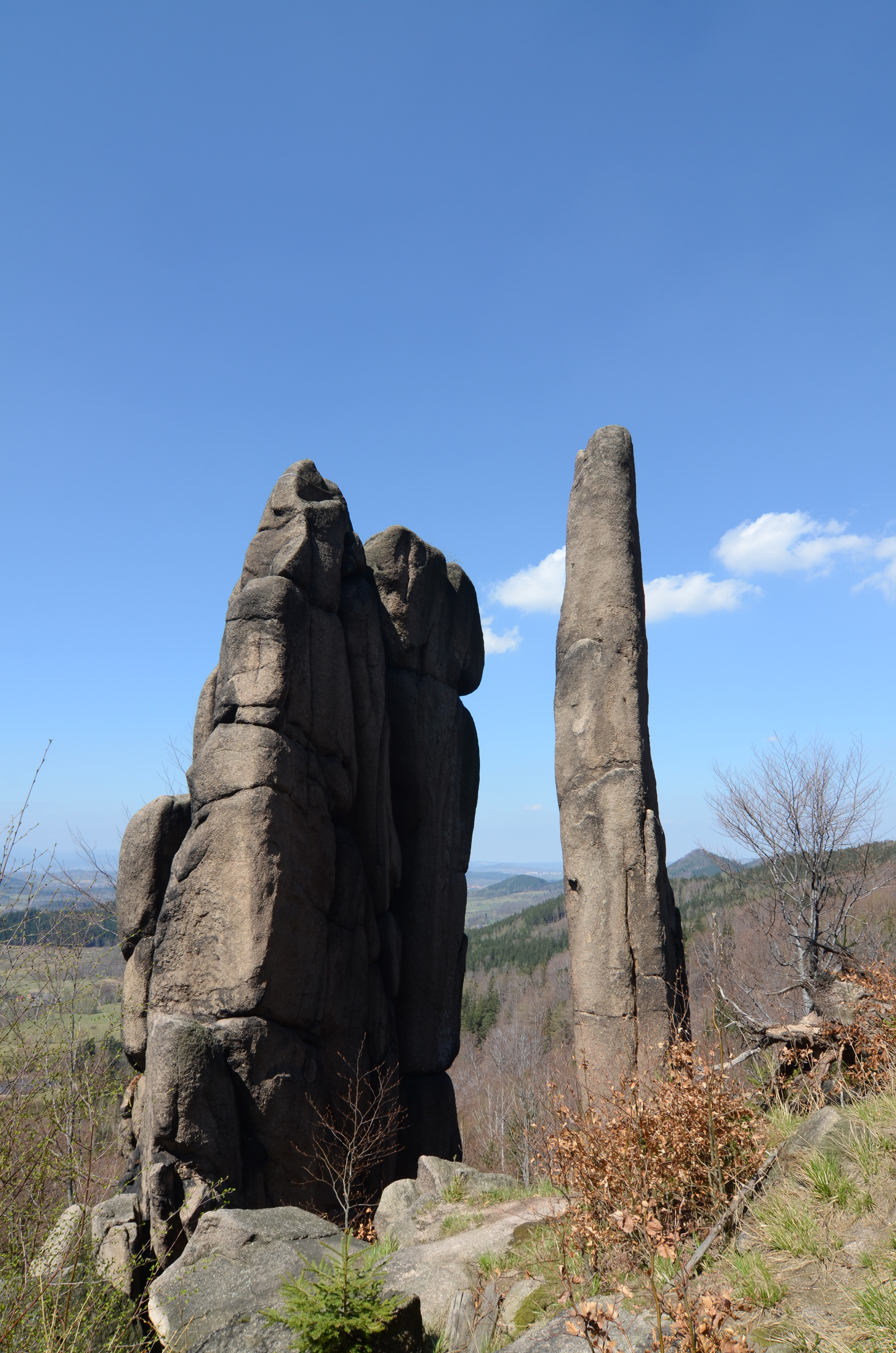
Rudawy Janowickie

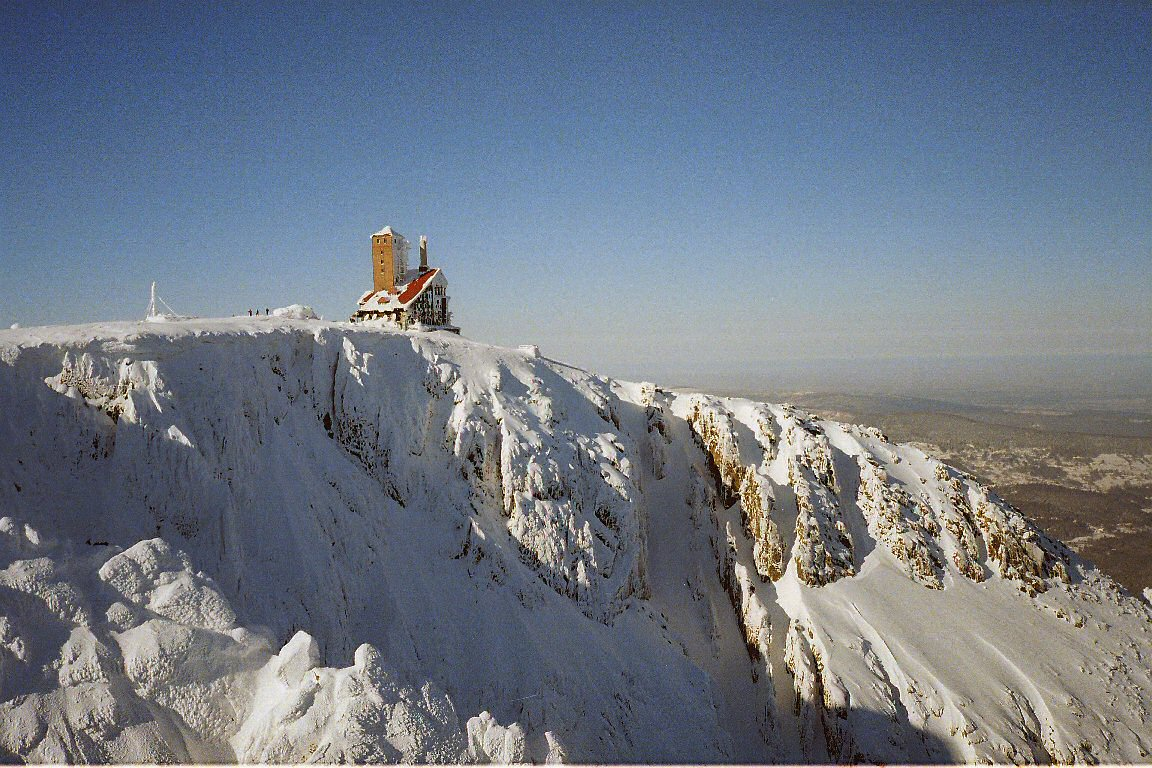
Snowy Pits

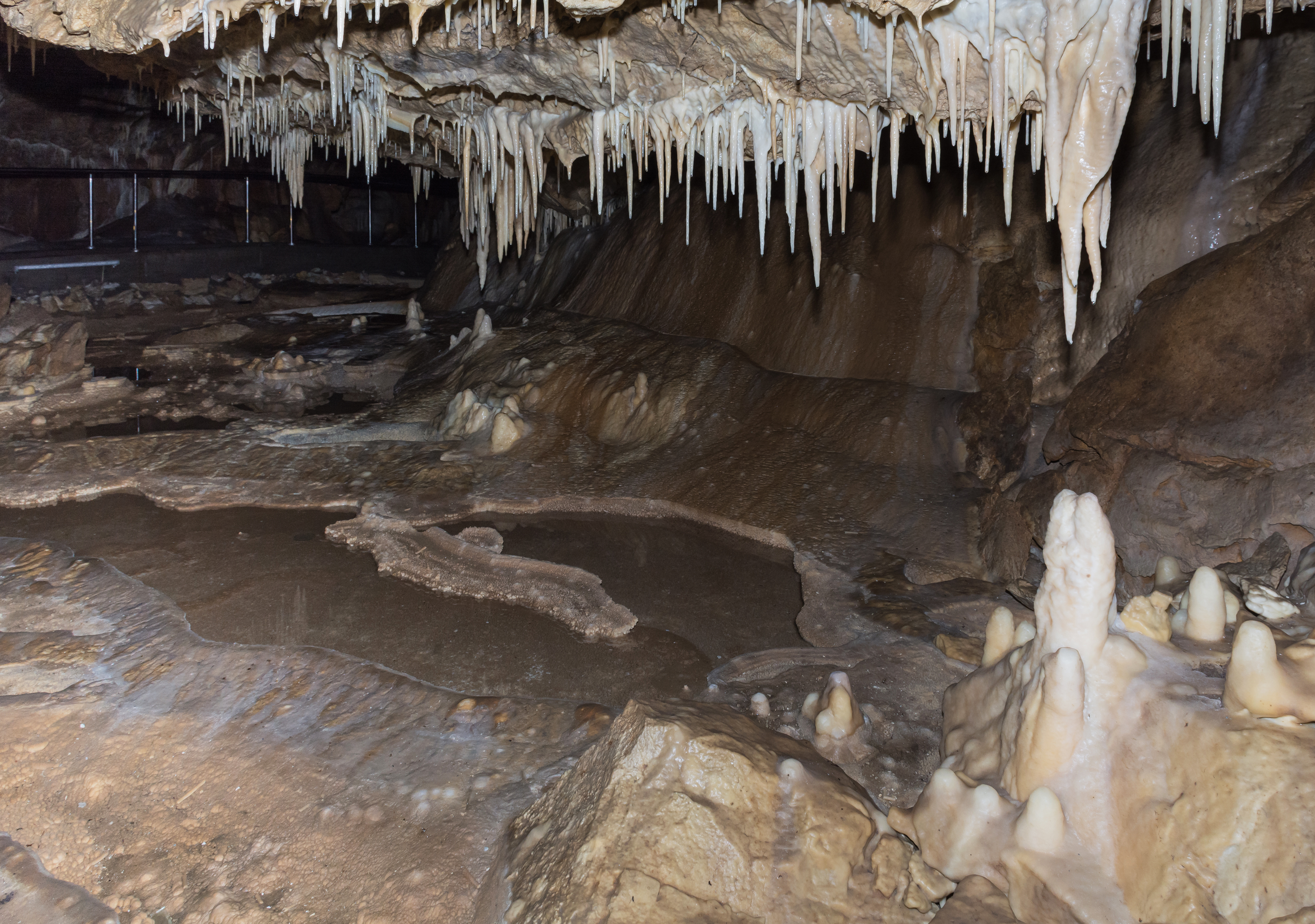
Bear's Cave

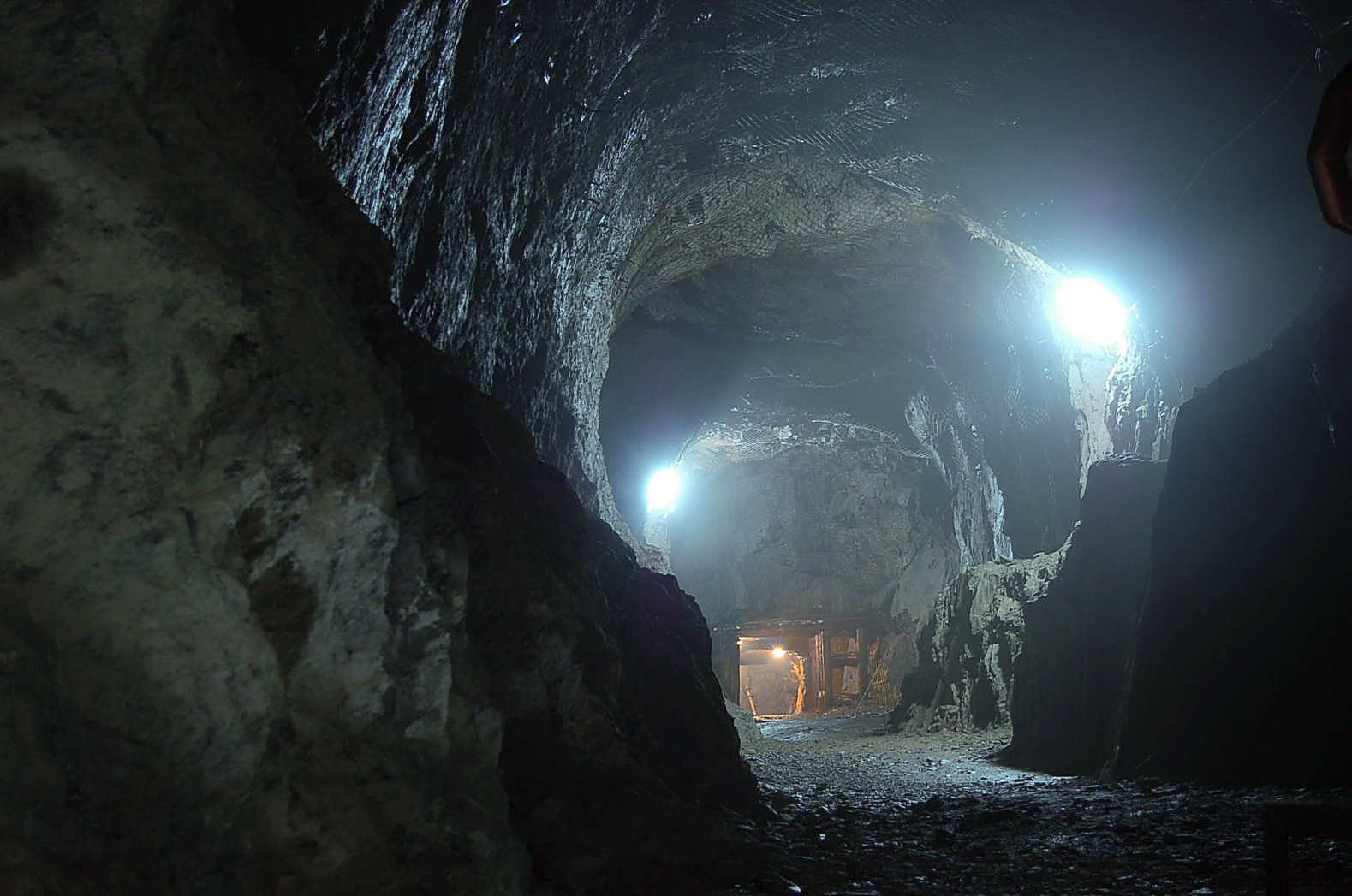
Project Riese, Owl Mountains

Protected areas in Lower Silesian Voivodeship:

- 2 National Parks
  - Karkonosze National Park (part of a UNESCO trans-border biosphere reserve)
  - Table Mountains National Park
- 12 Landscape Parks
  - Barycz Valley Landscape Park (partly in Greater Poland Voivodeship)
  - Bóbr Valley Landscape Park
  - Bystrzyca Valley Landscape Park
  - Chełmy Landscape Park
  - Jezierzyca Valley Landscape Park
  - Książ Landscape Park
  - Owl Mountains Landscape Park
  - Przemków Landscape Park
  - Rudawy Landscape Park
  - Ślęża Landscape Park
  - Śnieżnik Landscape Park
  - Sudety Wałbrzyskie Landscape Park
- 67 Nature reserves
- 20 protected landscape areas
- 3100 Natural monuments
- 114 Ecological usages
- 15 Teams nature and landscape

and many areas of Natura 2000 network.

=== Tourist routes ===
- The Main Trail Sudetes long-distance mountain trail
- The Piast Castles Trail
- Trail around Wrocław
- Cistercian trail
- The trail of the Valley of Palaces and Gardens of the Jelenia Góra Valley
- Lower Silesian Rout of St. James
- Sudetes Rout of St. James
- Camino de Santiago - Via Regia
- The Trail of Extinct Volcanoes on the Kaczawskie Foothills
- Lower Silesian Beer and Wine Trail
- EuroVelo 9
- Lower Silesian Bicycle Highway
- Bicycles S5 (Wrocław – Poznań)
- Blue Velo - The Odra River Bicycle Route

== Economy ==
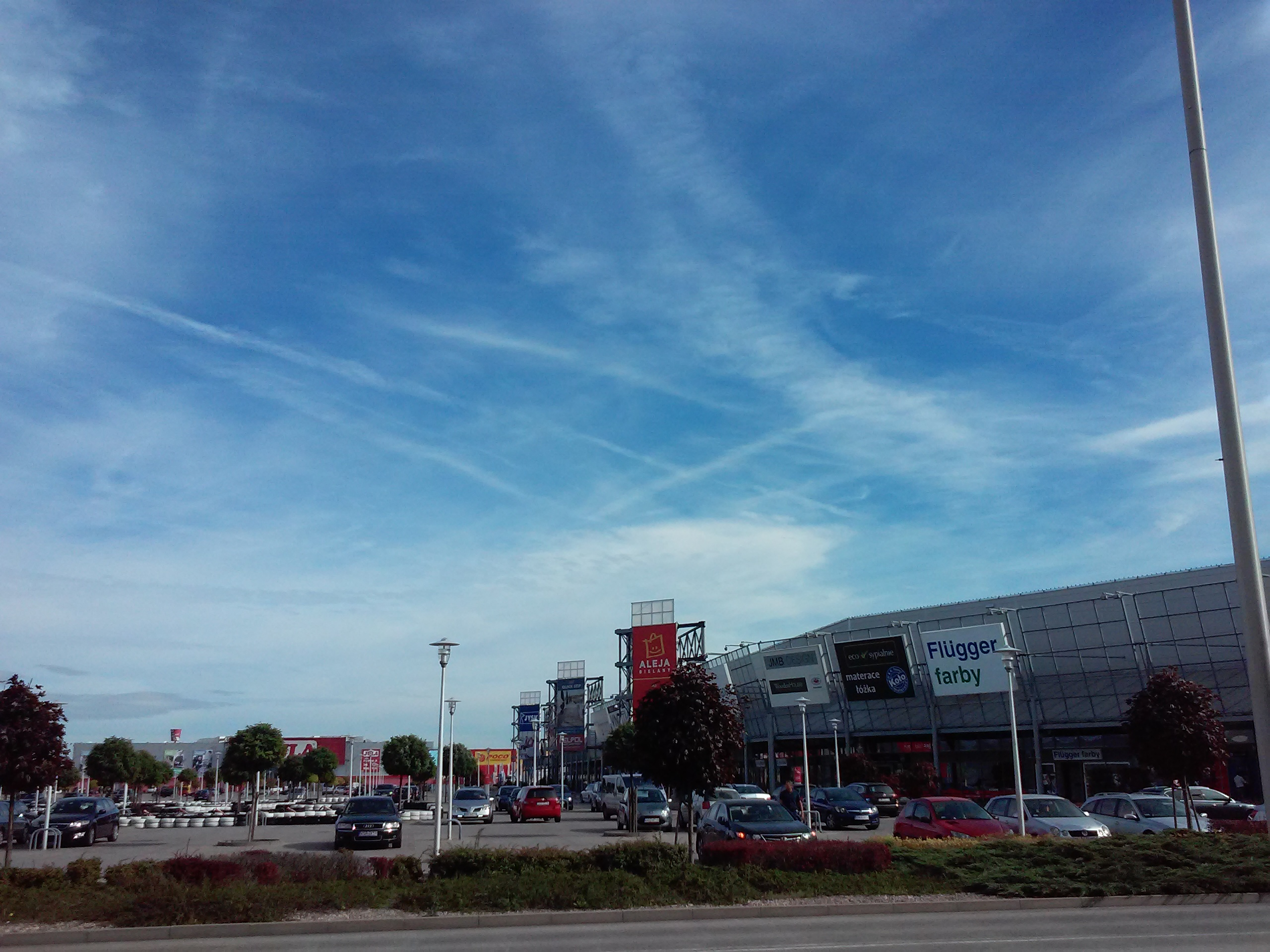
Bielany Avenue (pl. Aleja Bielany) - the largest shopping center in Poland

The gross domestic product (GDP) of the province was 41.1 billion euro in 2018, accounting for 8.3% of the Polish economic output. GDP per capita adjusted for purchasing power was €23,400 or 78% of the EU27 average in the same year. The GDP per employee was 85% of the EU average. Lower Silesia Voivodeship is the province with the second highest GDP per capita in Poland.

GDP per capita in Lower Silesian Voivodeship and Poland
Lower Silesian Voivodeship	GDP per capita	Poland	GDP per capita
2000	$10 440 (+2.8%)	2000	$10 140 (+4.0%)
2005	$13 060 (+4.9%)	2005	$12 600 (+3.5%)
2006	$13 700 (+7.3%)	2006	$13 020 (+6.2%)
2007	$14 980 (+9.5%)	2007	$13 760 (+6.5%)
2008	$16 030 (+7.2%)	2008	$14 450 (+5.0%)
2009	$16 350 (+2.0%)	2009	$14 720 (+1.9%)

=== Mining ===
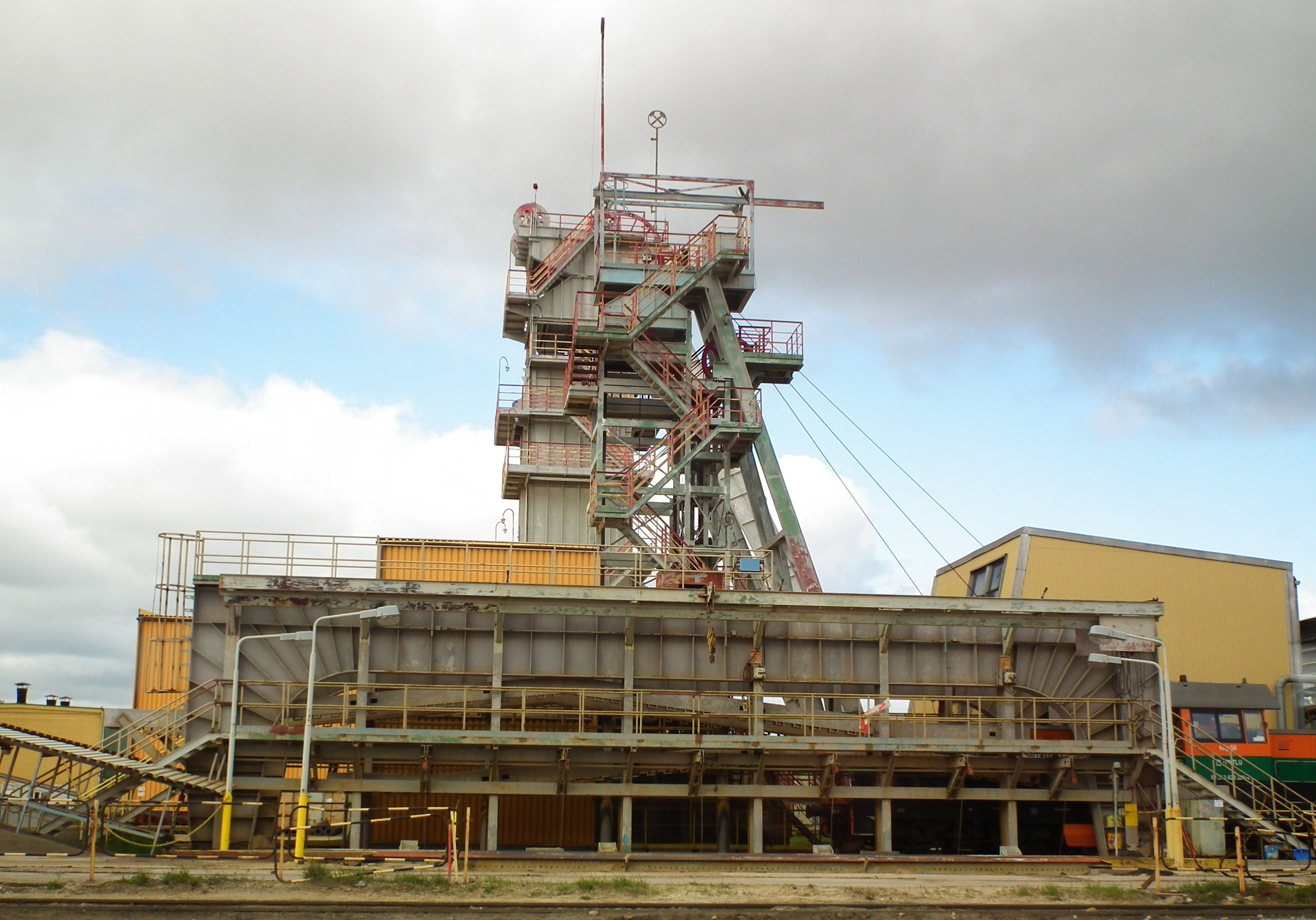
Rudna mine near Polkowice

The wealth of the Lower Silesian Voivodeship is partly due to mining and production of various minerals. The Legnica-Głogów Copper Basin (Polish: Legnicko-Głogowski Okręg Miedziowy) with the cities of Legnica, Głogów, Lubin and Polkowice produces copper, as well as other valuable minerals, making Poland the second largest producer of copper in Europe, and the largest producer of silver and rhenium in Europe and one of the largest in the world (as of 2024). Strzegom and its surroundings are the site of granite mining, and the town is called the "capital of Polish granite". One of the three largest lignite mines in Poland is located in Bogatynia.

Wałbrzych, Nowa Ruda and Boguszów-Gorce are former bituminous coal mining centers. Szklary was the location of the country's sole nickel ore mine, and one of only five places in the world, where the rare chrysoprase, carnelian and opal were extracted, and the place of discovery of the extremely rare szklaryite, nioboholtite and titanoholtite minerals. In the Middle Ages, gold (Polish: złoto) and silver (Polish: srebro) were mined in the region, which is reflected in the names of the former mining towns of Złotoryja, Złoty Stok and Srebrna Góra.

== Cities and towns ==
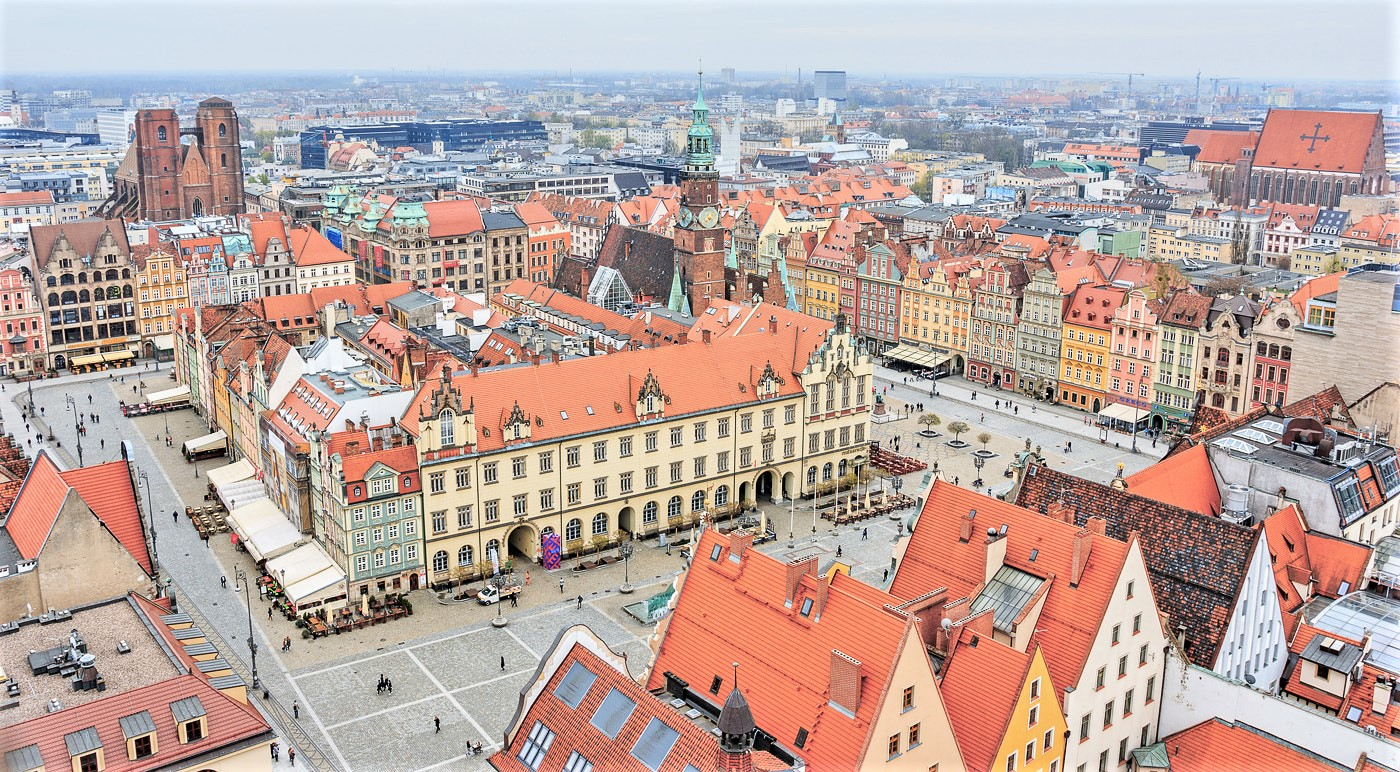
Wrocław

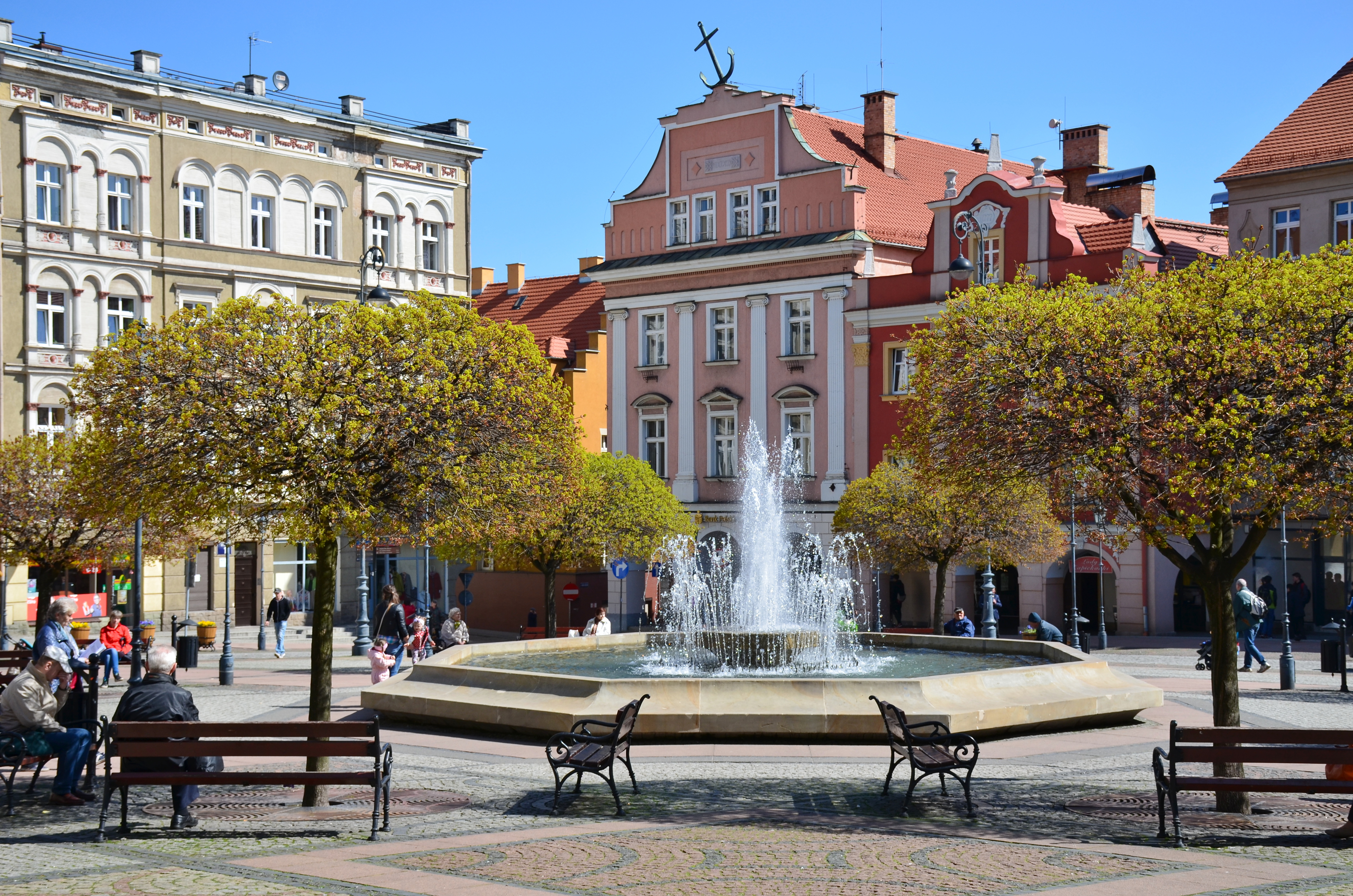
Wałbrzych

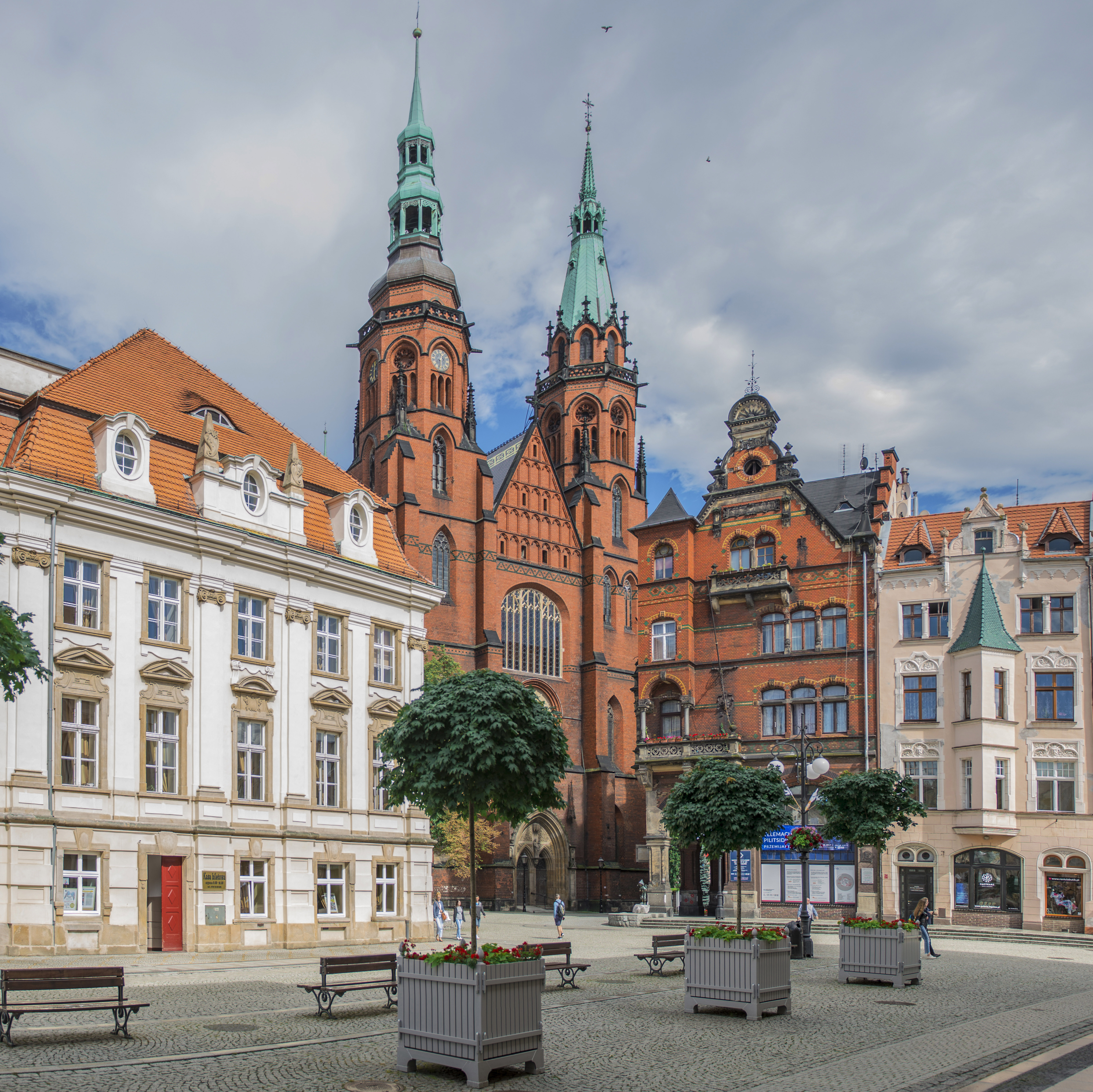
Legnica

The voivodeship contains 8 cities and 83 towns. The cities, governed by a city mayor (Polish: prezydent miasta), are listed below in descending order of population (as of 2019):

=== Cities ===
1. Wrocław (672,882)
2. Wałbrzych (98,748)
3. Legnica (90,823)
4. Jelenia Góra (74,194)
5. Lubin (66,864)
6. Głogów (61,206)
7. Świdnica (52,050)
8. Bolesławiec (36,795)

=== Towns ===
1. Oleśnica (34,914)
2. Oława (33,086)
3. Dzierżoniów (30,312)
4. Zgorzelec (28,466)
5. Bielawa (27,713)
6. Kłodzko (24,503)
7. Jawor (22,890)
8. Świebodzice (22,793)
9. Polkowice (22,480)
10. Nowa Ruda (22,067)
11. Lubań (21,087)
12. Kamienna Góra (19,010)
13. Bogatynia (17,436)
14. Strzegom (16,106)
15. Jelcz-Laskowice (15,803)
16. Złotoryja (15,564)
17. Boguszów-Gorce (15,368)
18. Ząbkowice Śląskie (15,004)
19. Chojnów (13,355)
20. Trzebnica (13,331)
21. Brzeg Dolny (12,511)
22. Strzelin (12,460)
23. Wołów (12,373)
24. Góra (11,797)
25. Milicz (11,304)
26. Kowary (10,869)
27. Syców (10,397)
28. Bystrzyca Kłodzka (10,134)
29. Kudowa-Zdrój (9,892)
30. Środa Śląska (9,516)
31. Oborniki Śląskie (9,099)
32. Lwówek Śląski (8,869)
33. Ziębice (8,708)
34. Siechnice (8,113)
35. Chocianów (7,892)
36. Pieszyce (7,123)
37. Kąty Wrocławskie (6,994)
38. Sobótka (6,981)
39. Żarów (6,719)
40. Twardogóra (6,692)
41. Gryfów Śląski (6,636)
42. Szklarska Poręba (6,557)
43. Żmigród (6,435)
44. Piława Górna (6,412)
45. Głuszyca (6,361)
46. Polanica-Zdrój (6,324)
47. Piechowice (6,194)
48. Przemków (6,107)
49. Lubawka (6,028)
50. Pieńsk (5,828)
51. Stronie Śląskie (5,709)
52. Szczawno-Zdrój (5,608)
53. Ścinawa (5,582)
54. Lądek-Zdrój (5,572)
55. Szczytna (5,141)
56. Jaworzyna Śląska (5,124)
57. Bolków (4,990)
58. Bierutów (4,867)
59. Jedlina-Zdrój (4,828)
60. Karpacz (4,593)
61. Duszniki-Zdrój (4,584)
62. Leśna (4,439)
63. Olszyna (4,348)
64. Kamieniec Ząbkowicki (4,291)
65. Nowogrodziec (4,243)
66. Zawidów (4,180)
67. Świeradów-Zdrój (4,147)
68. Mieroszów (4,070)
69. Mirsk (3,886)
70. Wojcieszów (3,668)
71. Prochowice (3,602)
72. Niemcza (2,965)
73. Węgliniec (2,846)
74. Złoty Stok (2,758)
75. Wąsosz (2,662)
76. Międzylesie (2,575)
77. Bardo (2,562)
78. Radków (2,406)
79. Międzybórz (2,341)
80. Świerzawa (2,286)
81. Prusice (2,243)
82. Wiązów (2,241)
83. Miękinia (2,150)
84. Lubomierz (1,979)
85. Wleń (1,759)

== Administrative divisions ==
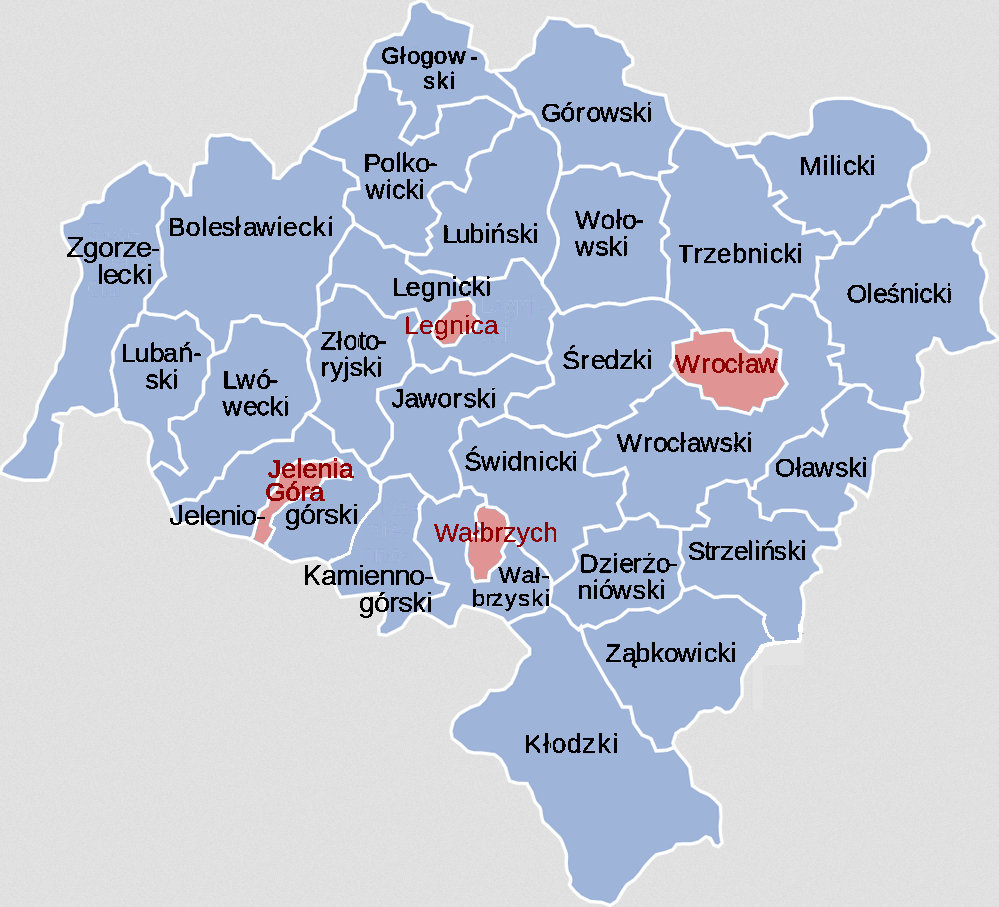
Map of the powiats (counties)

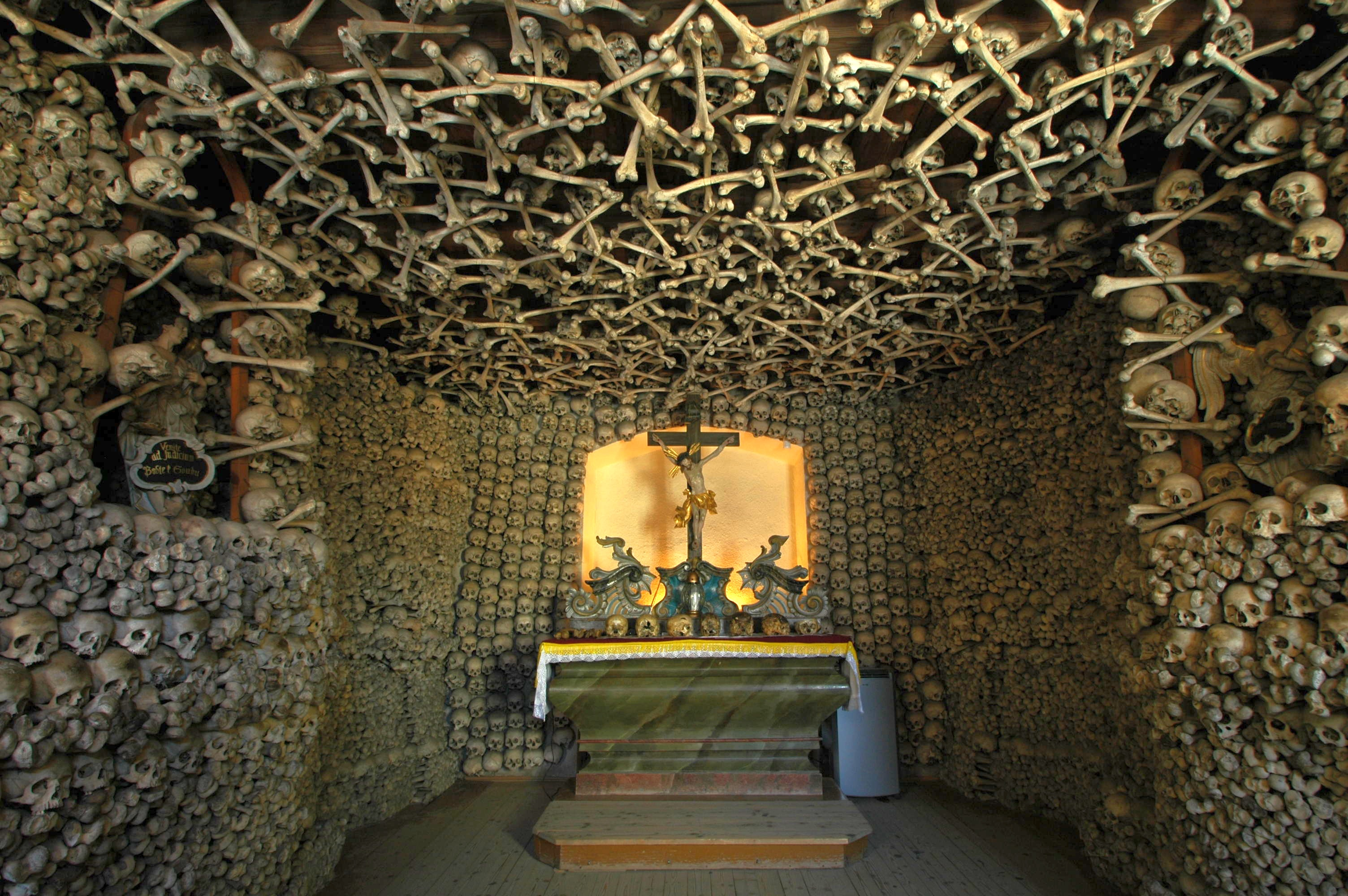
The Skull Chapel in Kudowa-Zdrój

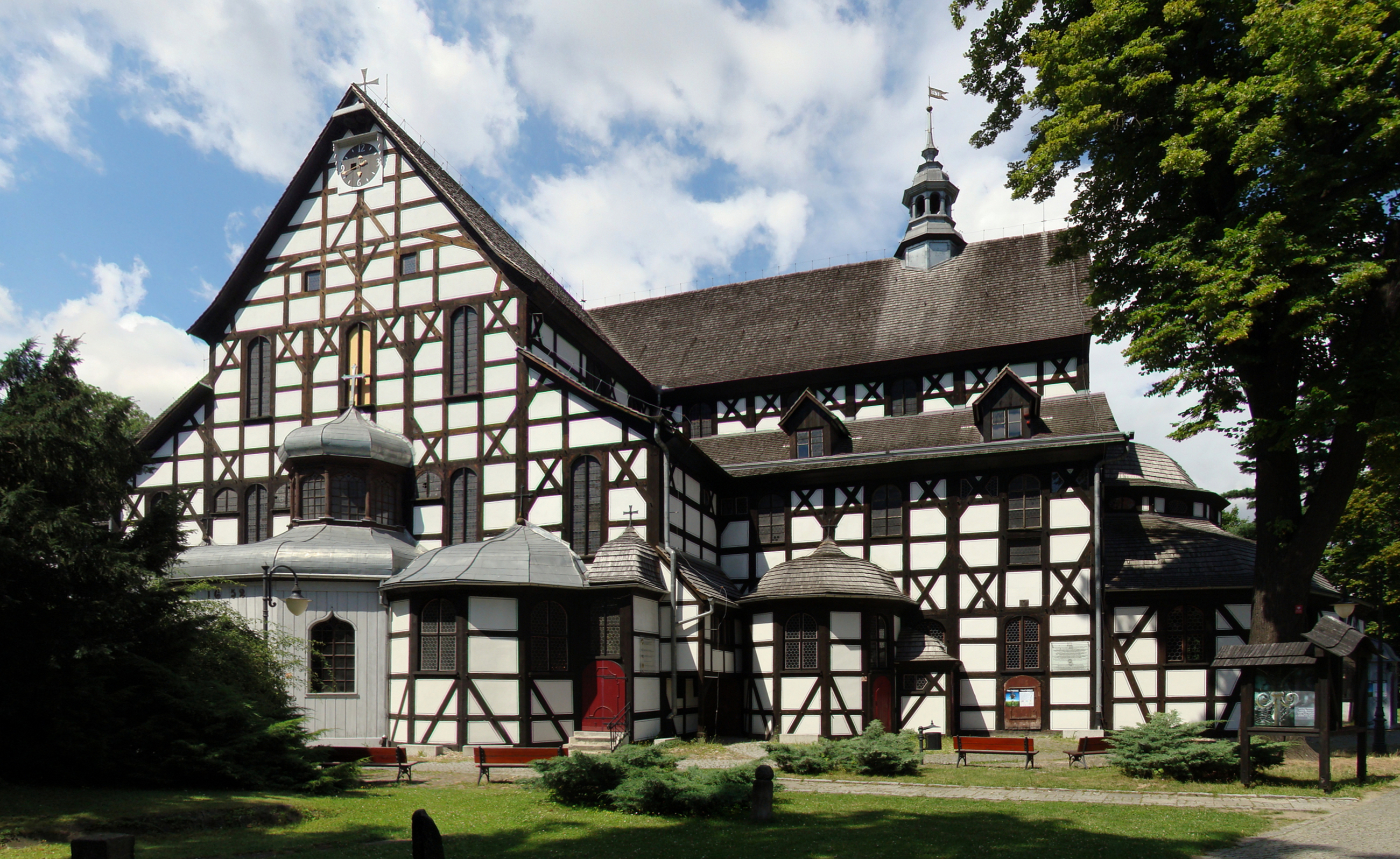
The Church of Peace in Świdnica is a UNESCO World Heritage Site.

Lower Silesian Voivodeship is divided into 30 counties (powiaty), four of which are city counties. These are further divided into 169 gminy.

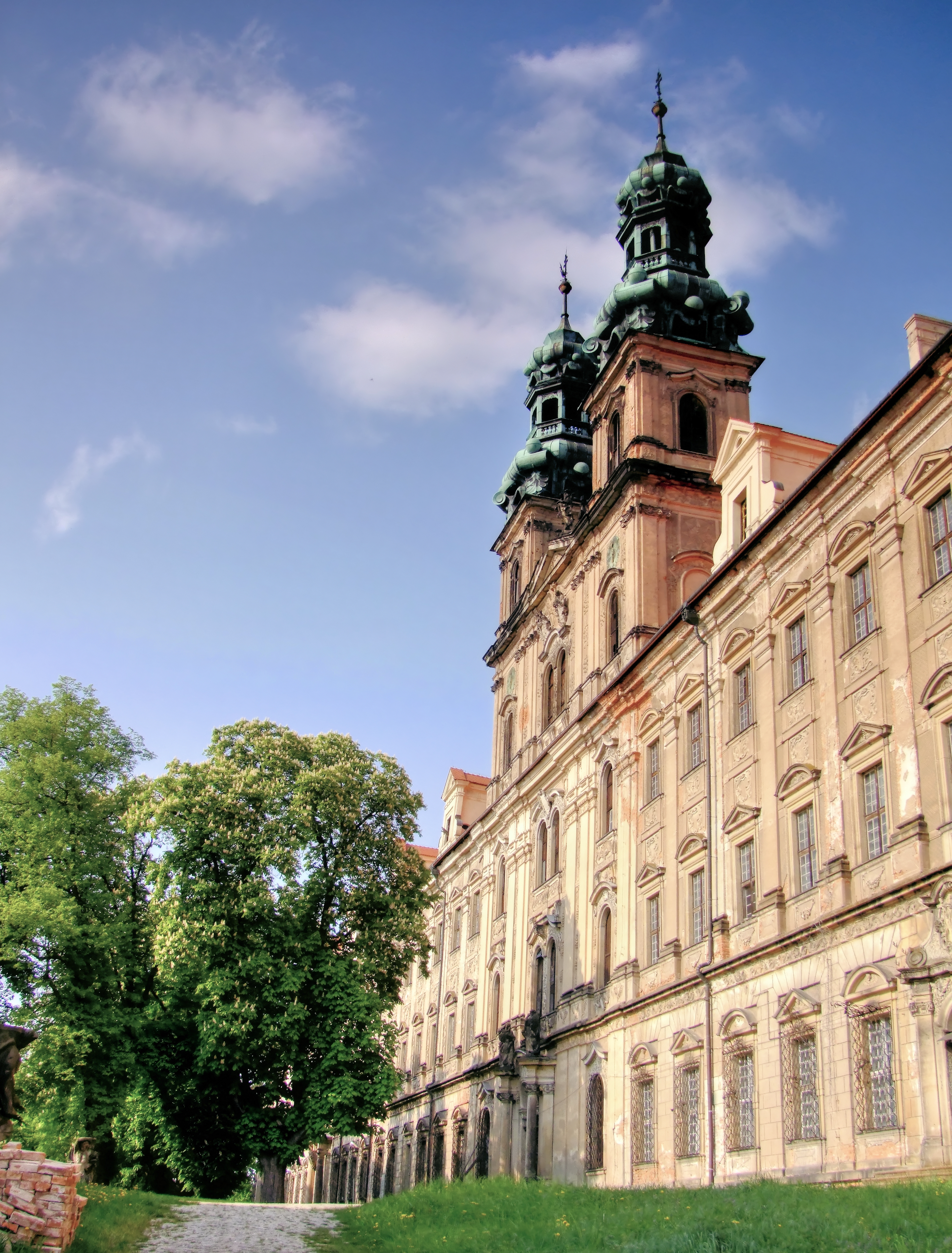
Cistercian Lubiąż Abbey

Lower Silesia is divided into three additional delegation districts governed by the provincial government, with Wrocław serving as the capital of the administrative region:

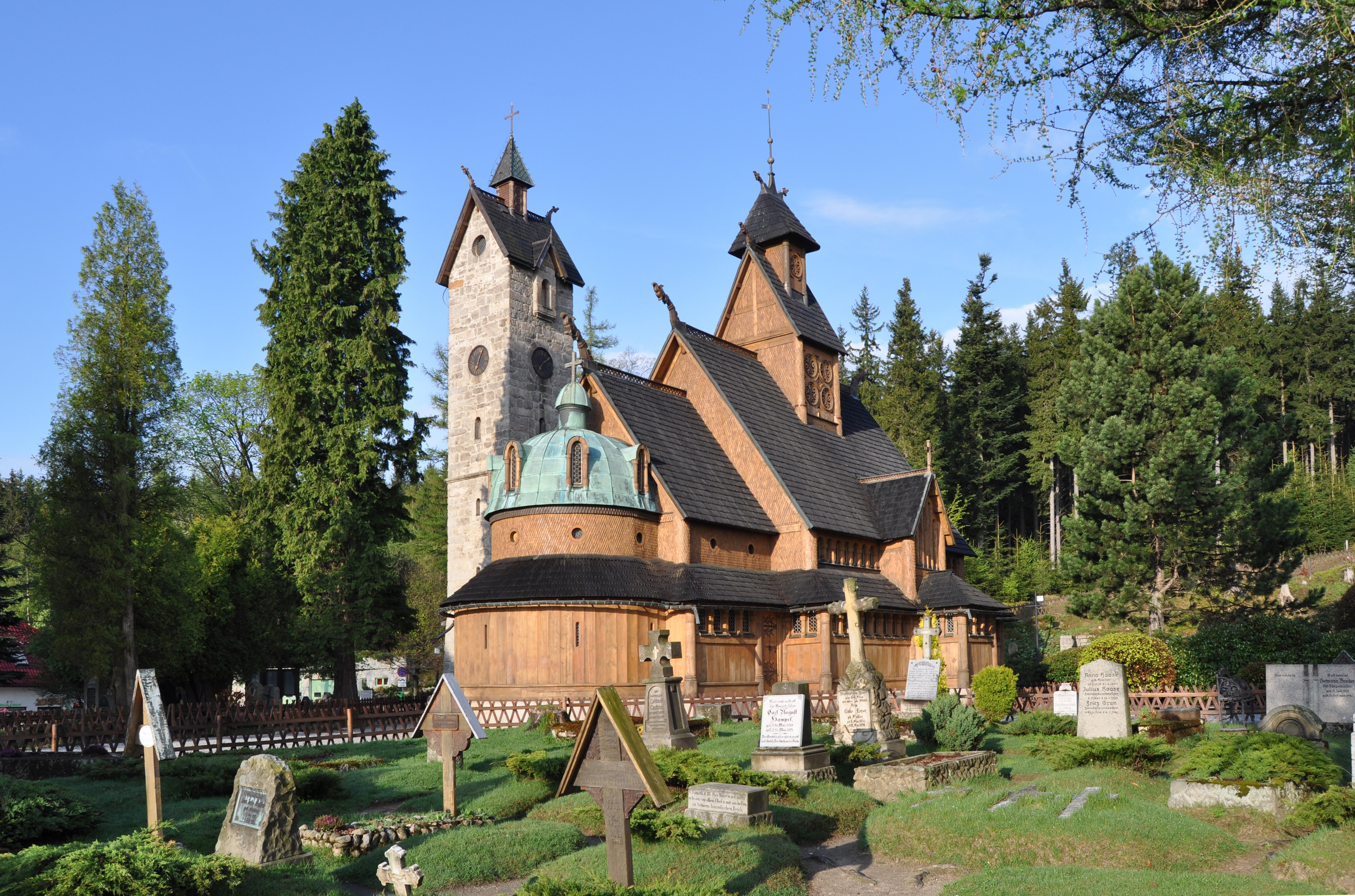
800-year old Vang Stave Church in Karpacz

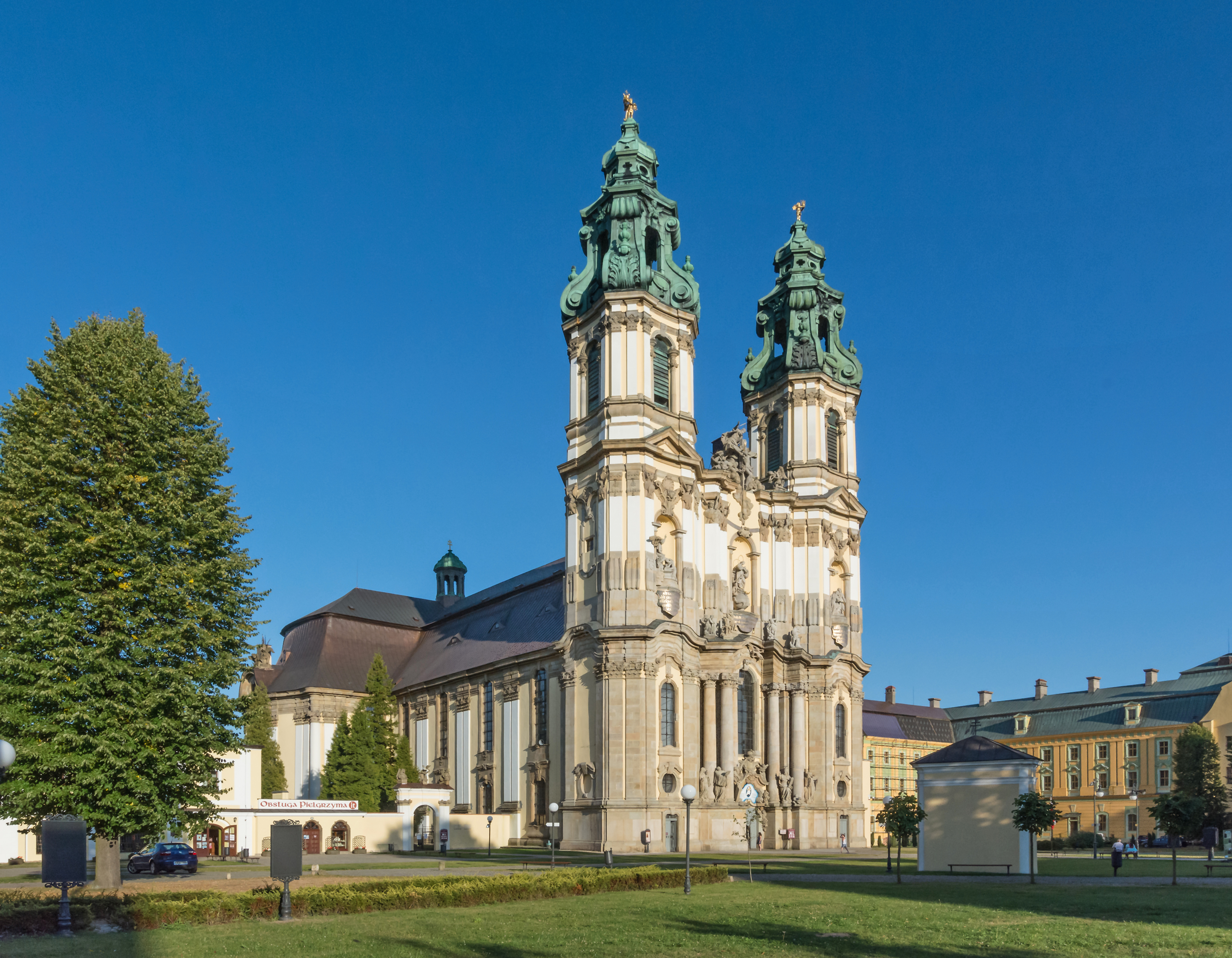
Abbey of the Order of Saint Benedict in Krzeszów

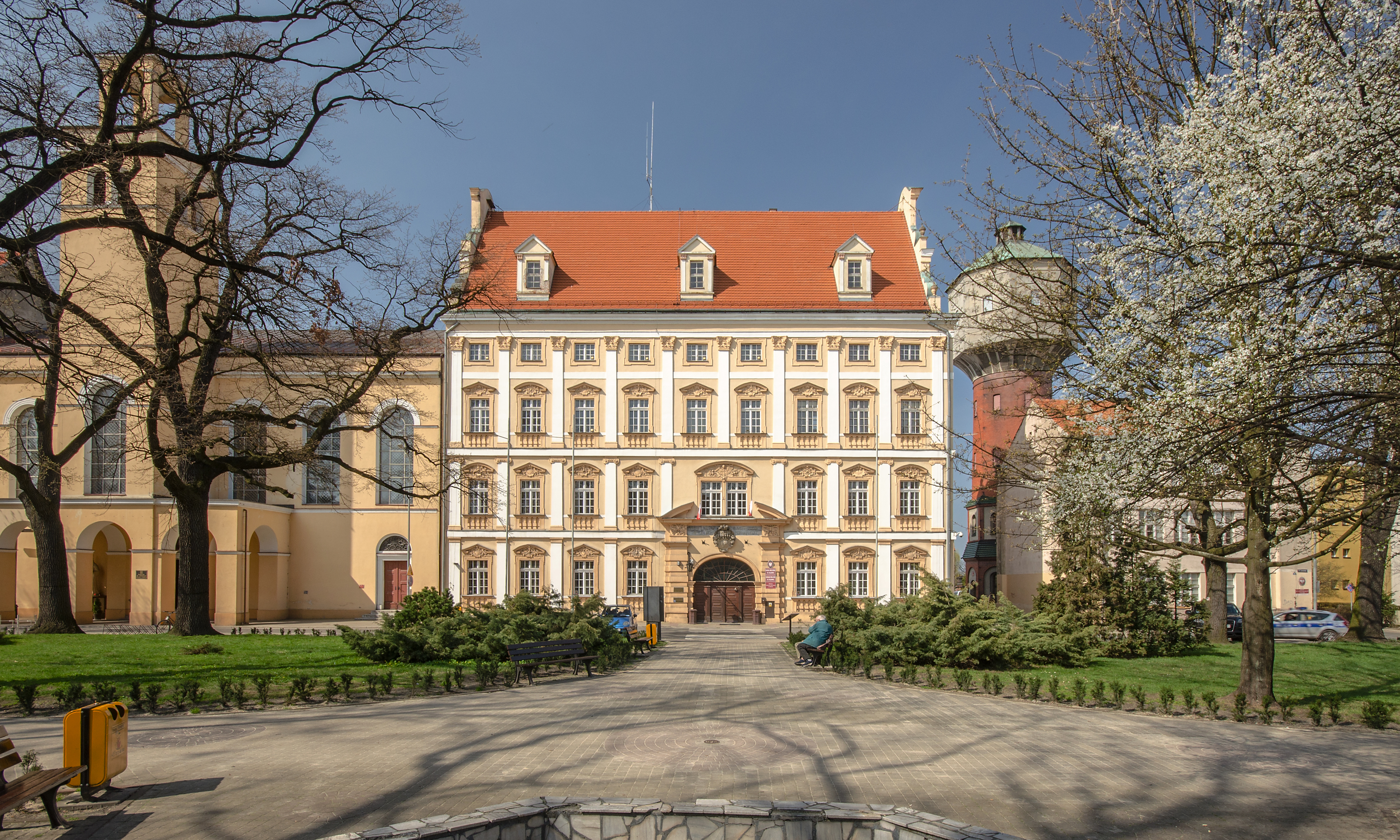
Sobieski Castle in Oława

- Wałbrzych Delegation District - powiaty of Świdnica, Kłodzko, Ząbkowice Śląskie, Dzierżoniów.
- Legnica Delegation District - powiaty of Głogów, Jawor, Lubin, Polkowice, Złotoryja.
- Jelenia Góra Delegation District - powiaty of Boleslawiec, Kamienna Góra, Luban, Lwówek Śląski, Zgorzelec.

The counties are listed in the following table (ordering within categories is by decreasing population).

English and Polish names	Area (km^{2})	Population (2019)	Seat	Other towns	Total gminas
City counties
Wrocław	293	641,607			1
Wałbrzych	84.70	111,896			1
Legnica	56.29	99,486			1
Jelenia Góra	109.22	79,200			1
Land counties
Kłodzko County powiat kłodzki	1643.37	158,600	Kłodzko	Nowa Ruda, Bystrzyca Kłodzka, Kudowa-Zdrój, Polanica-Zdrój, Stronie Śląskie, Lądek-Zdrój, Szczytna, Duszniki-Zdrój, Międzylesie, Radków	14
Świdnica County powiat świdnicki	742.89	157,178	Świdnica	Świebodzice, Strzegom, Żarów, Jaworzyna Śląska	8
Wrocław County powiat wrocławski	1116.15	148,663	Wrocław*	Sobótka, Kąty Wrocławskie, Siechnice	9
Oleśnica County powiat oleśnicki	1049.74	107,090	Oleśnica	Syców, Twardogóra, Bierutów, Międzybórz	8
Lubin County powiat lubiński	711.99	106,211	Lubin	Ścinawa	4
Dzierżoniów County powiat dzierżoniowski	478.34	101,118	Dzierżoniów	Bielawa, Gola Dzierżoniowska, Niemcza, Pieszyce, Piława Górna	7
Bolesławiec County powiat bolesławiecki	1303.26	90,108	Bolesławiec	Nowogrodziec	6
Zgorzelec County powiat zgorzelecki	838.11	89,612	Zgorzelec	Bogatynia, Pieńsk, Zawidów, Węgliniec	7
Głogów County powiat głogowski	443.06	89,319	Głogów		6
Trzebnica County powiat trzebnicki	1025.55	85,092	Trzebnica	Oborniki Śląskie, Żmigród, Prusice	6
Oława County powiat oławski	523.73	76,723	Oława	Jelcz-Laskowice	4
Ząbkowice County powiat ząbkowicki	801.75	65,104	Ząbkowice Śląskie	Ziębice, Złoty Stok, Bardo, Kamieniec Ząbkowicki	7
Karkonosze County powiat karkonoski	628.21	63,639	Jelenia Góra*	Kowary, Szklarska Poręba, Piechowice, Karpacz	9
Polkowice County powiat polkowicki	779.93	62,948	Polkowice	Chocianów, Przemków	6
Wałbrzych County powiat wałbrzyski	430.22	55,820	Wałbrzych*	Boguszów-Gorce, Głuszyca, Szczawno-Zdrój, Jedlina-Zdrój, Mieroszów	9
Legnica County powiat legnicki	744.60	55,318	Legnica*	Chojnów, Prochowice	8
Środa County powiat średzki	703.68	54,646	Środa Śląska	Miękinia	5
Lubań County powiat lubański	428.30	54,493	Lubań	Olszyna, Leśna, Świeradów-Zdrój	7
Jawor County powiat jaworski	581.25	50,315	Jawor	Bolków	6
Wołów County powiat wołowski	675.00	46,914	Wołów	Brzeg Dolny	3
Lwówek County powiat lwówecki	709.94	45,975	Lwówek Śląski	Gryfów Śląski, Mirsk, Wleń, Lubomierz	5
Złotoryja County powiat złotoryjski	575.45	43,719	Złotoryja	Wojcieszów, Świerzawa	6
Strzelin County powiat strzeliński	622.27	43,713	Strzelin	Wiązów	5
Kamienna Góra County powiat kamiennogórski	396.13	43,429	Kamienna Góra	Lubawka	4
Milicz County powiat milicki	715.01	37,003	Milicz		3
Góra County powiat górowski	738.11	35,047	Góra	Wąsosz	4
* seat not part of the county

== Governors ==
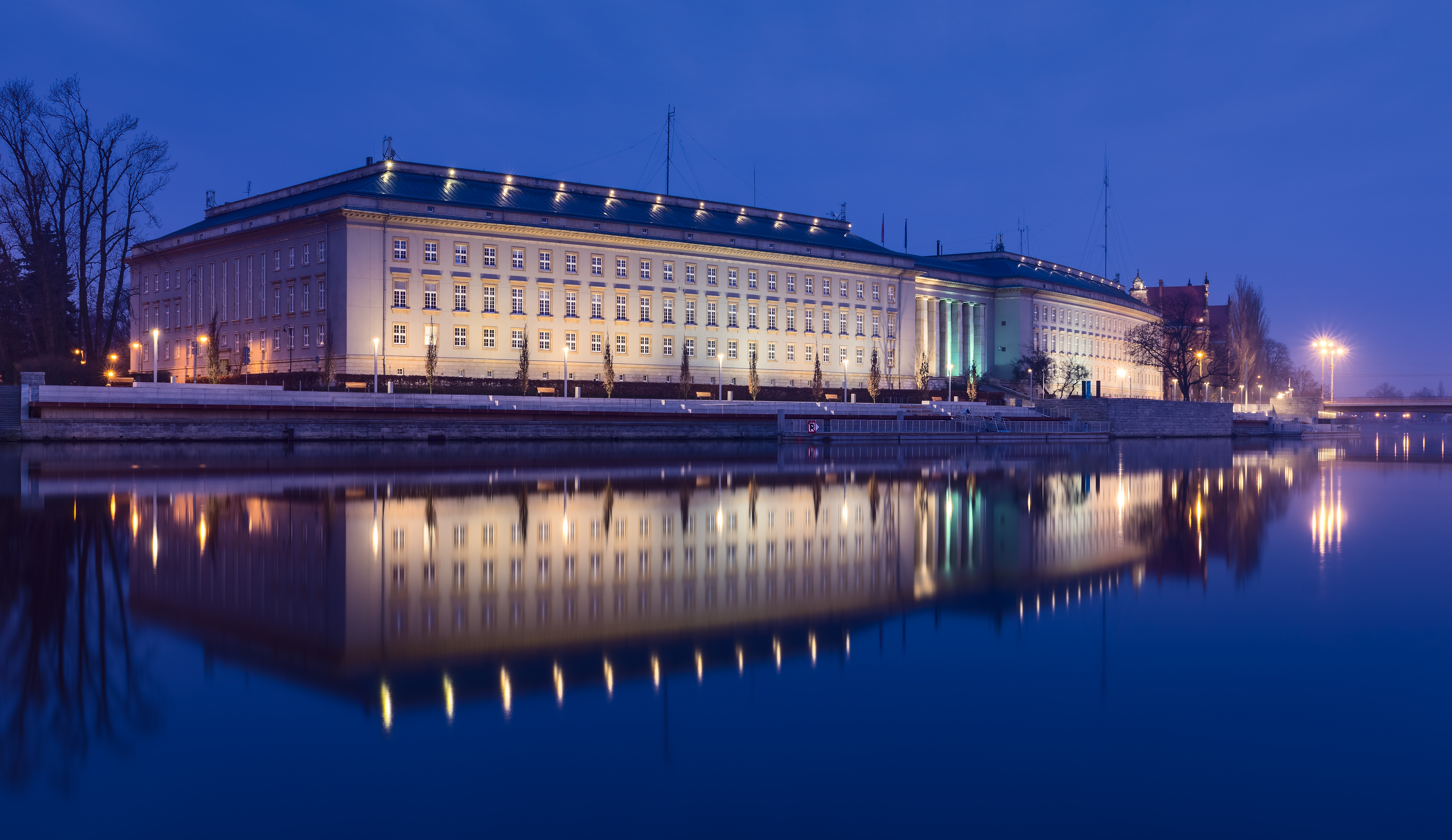
Lower Silesian Voivodeship Office in Wrocław

Name	Period
Witold Krochmal	4 January 1999 – 22 October 2001
Ryszard Nawrat	22 October 2001 – 21 March 2003
Stanisław Łopatowski	31 March 2003 – 21 December 2005
Krzysztof Grzelczyk	21 December 2005 – 29 November 2007
Rafał Jurkowlaniec	29 November 2007 – 1 December 2010
Aleksander Skorupa	28 December 2010 – 11 March 2014
Tomasz Smolarz (Civic Platform)	12 March 2014 – 8 December 2015
Paweł Hreniak (Law and Justice)	8 December 2015 – 11 November 2019
Jarosław Obremski (Law and Justice)	5 December 2019 – 22 December 2023
Maciej Awiżeń (Civic Platform)	22 December 2023 – 25 November 2024
Anna Żabska	25 November 2024 - Present

== Sports ==
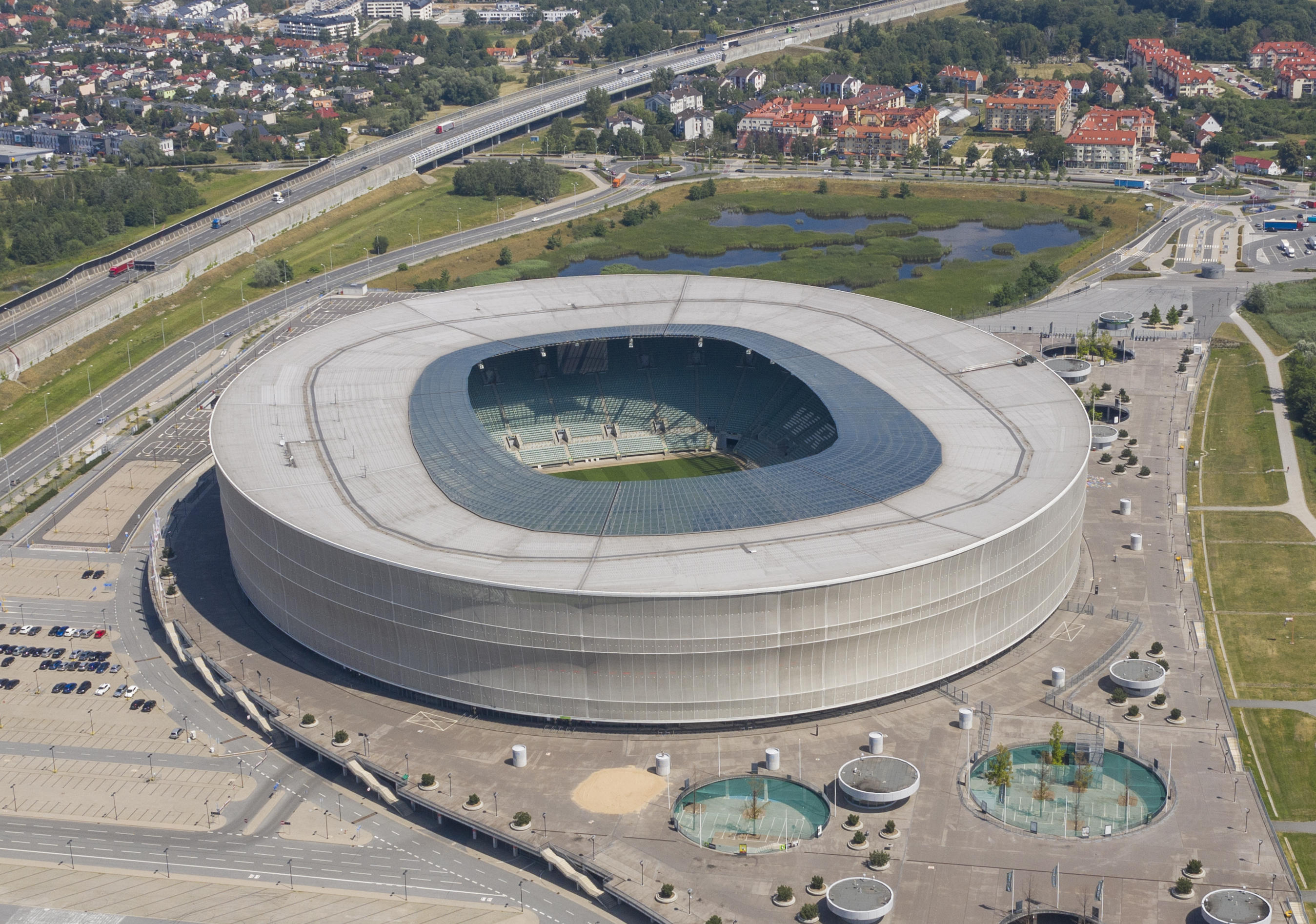
Wrocław Stadium, one of the arenas of the UEFA Euro 2012 and home venue of the Śląsk Wrocław football team

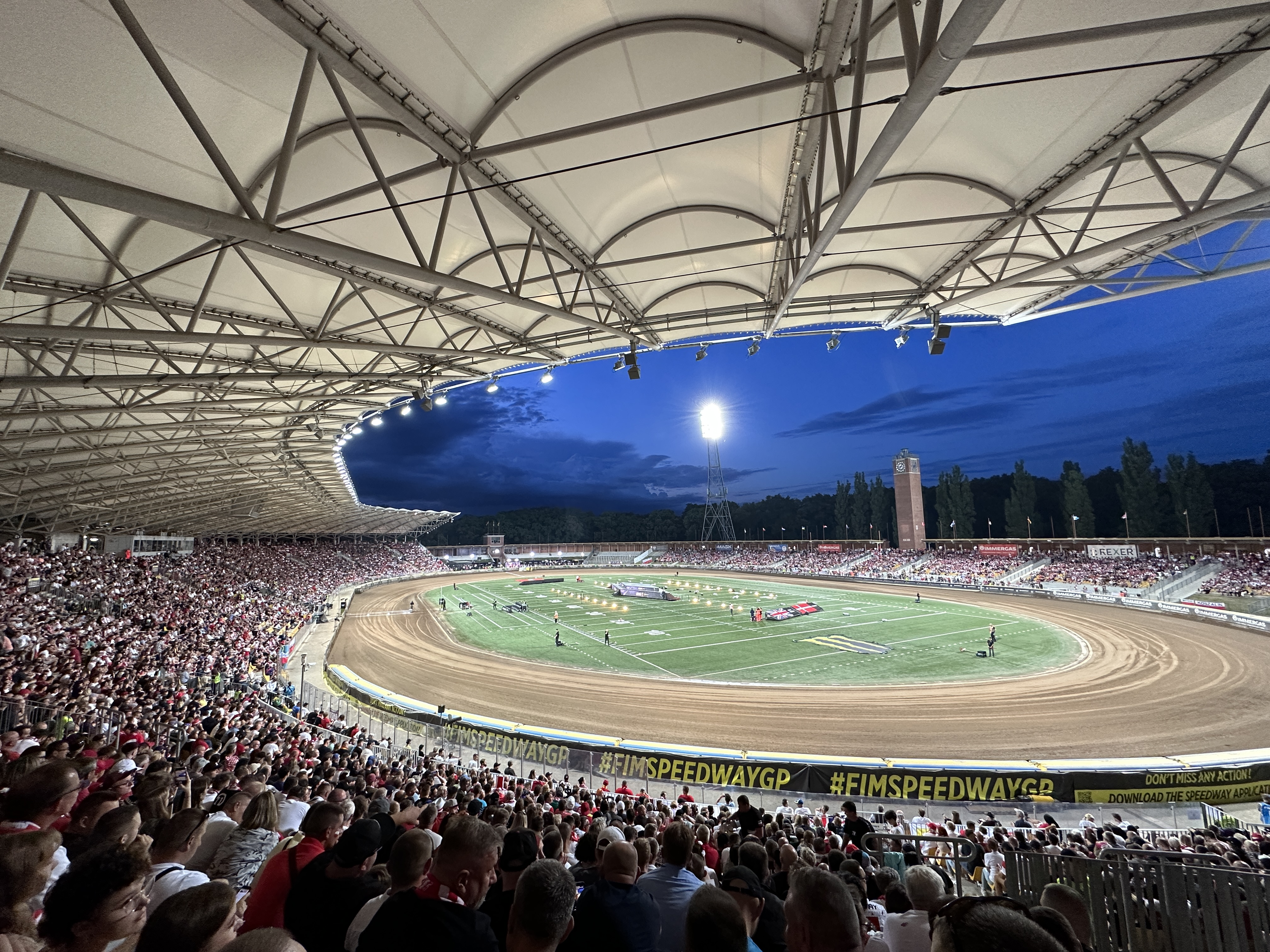
Olympic Stadium, one of the arenas of the Speedway Grand Prix of Poland and home venue of the Sparta Wrocław speedway team and Panthers Wrocław American football team

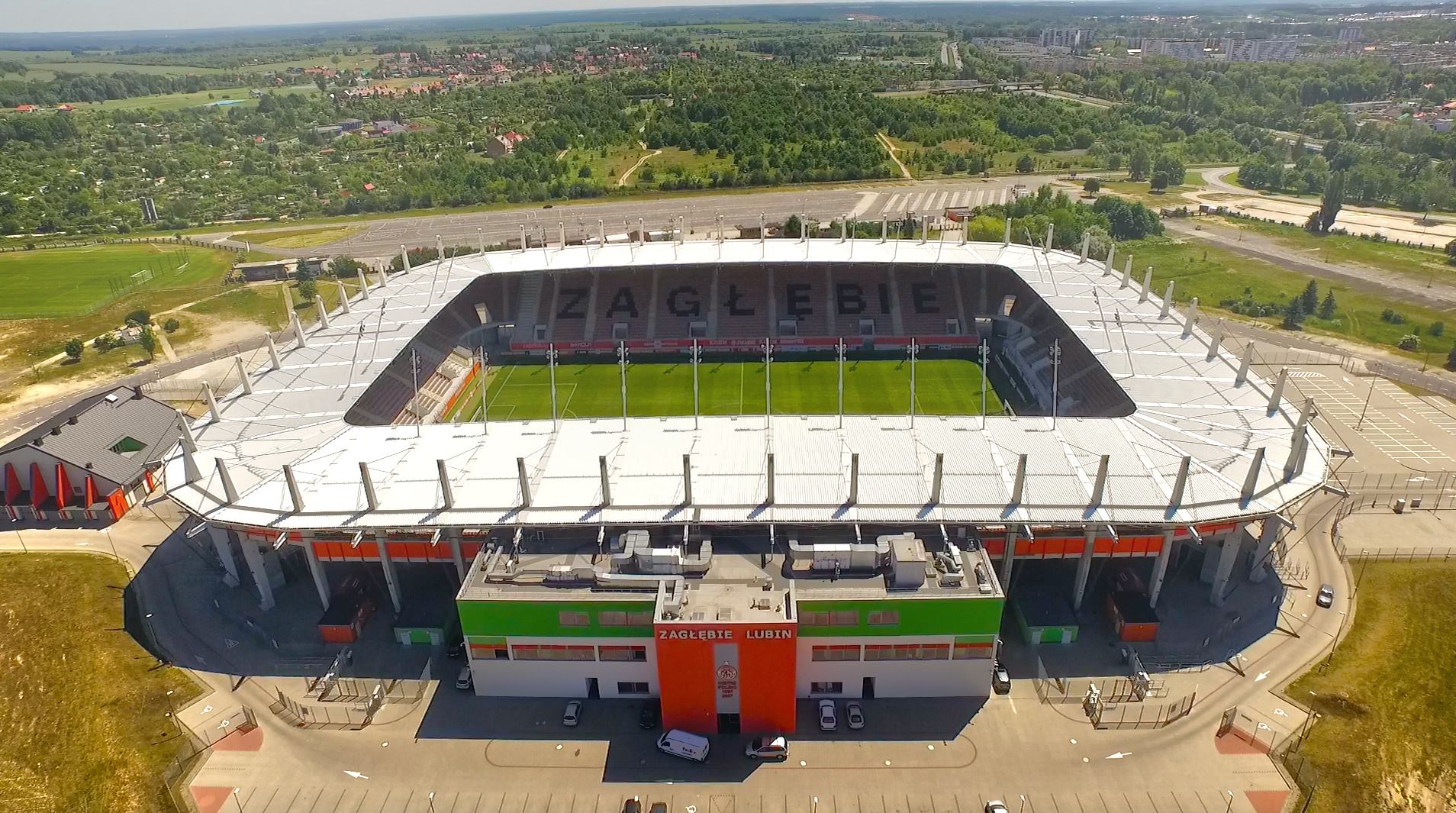
Lubin Stadium, home venue of the Zagłębie Lubin football team

Speedway, football, basketball, handball and volleyball enjoy the largest following in the voivodeship with several accomplished teams.

Professional sports teams
Club	Sport	League	Trophies
Śląsk Wrocław	Basketball (men's)	Polish Basketball League	18 Polish Championships; 14 Polish Cups
Górnik Wałbrzych	Basketball (men's)	Polish Basketball League	2 Polish Championships (1982, 1988); 1 Polish Cup (2025)
Ślęza Wrocław	Basketball (women's)	Basket Liga Kobiet	2 Polish Championships (1987, 2017); 1 Polish Cup (2026)
BC Polkowice	Basketball (women's)	Basket Liga Kobiet	5 Polish Championships; 6 Polish Cups
Śląsk Wrocław	Handball (men's)	Polish Superliga	15 Polish Championships; 7 Polish Cups
SPR Chrobry Głogów	Handball (men's)	Polish Superliga	0
Zagłębie Lubin	Handball (men's)	Polish Superliga	1 Polish Championship (2007); 1 Polish Cup (1993)
Miedź Legnica	Handball (men's)	Liga Centralna (2nd tier)	0
Zagłębie Lubin	Handball (women's)	Superliga	7 Polish Championships; 11 Polish Cups
KPR Kobierzyce	Handball (women's)	Superliga	1 Polish Cup (2022)
MKS Jelenia Góra	Handball (women's)	Liga Centralna (2nd tier)	0
Dziewiątka Legnica	Handball (women's)	Liga Centralna (2nd tier)	0
Sparta Wrocław	Speedway	Ekstraliga	5 Polish Championships
Śląsk Wrocław	Football (men's)	Ekstraklasa	2 Polish Championships (1977, 2012); 2 Polish Cups (1976, 1987)
Zagłębie Lubin	Football (men's)	Ekstraklasa	2 Polish Championships (1991, 2007)
Miedź Legnica	Football (men's)	I liga (2nd tier)	1 Polish Cup (1992)
Chrobry Głogów	Football (men's)	I liga (2nd tier)	0
Śląsk Wrocław	Football (women's)	Ekstraliga	0
Gwardia Wrocław	Volleyball (men's)	I liga (2nd tier)	3 Polish Championships; 1 Polish Cup (1981)
Gwardia Wrocław	Volleyball (women's)	Tauron Liga	0
Panthers Wrocław	American football	American Football League Europe	4 Polish Championships
Jaguars Kąty Wrocławskie	American football	Polish Football League	0

Since the establishment of the province, various major international sports competitions were co-hosted by the province, including the EuroBasket 2009, 2009 Women's European Volleyball Championship, 2010 Acrobatic Gymnastics World Championships, UEFA Euro 2012, 2014 FIVB Volleyball Men's World Championship, 2016 European Men's Handball Championship, 2017 World Games.

== Curiosities ==
- The city of Bolesławiec is a center of pottery production since the Middle Ages. See also: Bolesławiec pottery.
- Gompa Drophan Ling in Darnków, Poland's only Buddhist gompa, is located in the voivodeship.
- There are several sites in the province associated with Princess Marianne of the Netherlands, most notably the Kamieniec Ząbkowicki Palace, a Historic Monument of Poland.
