= Wadochowice =

- Village
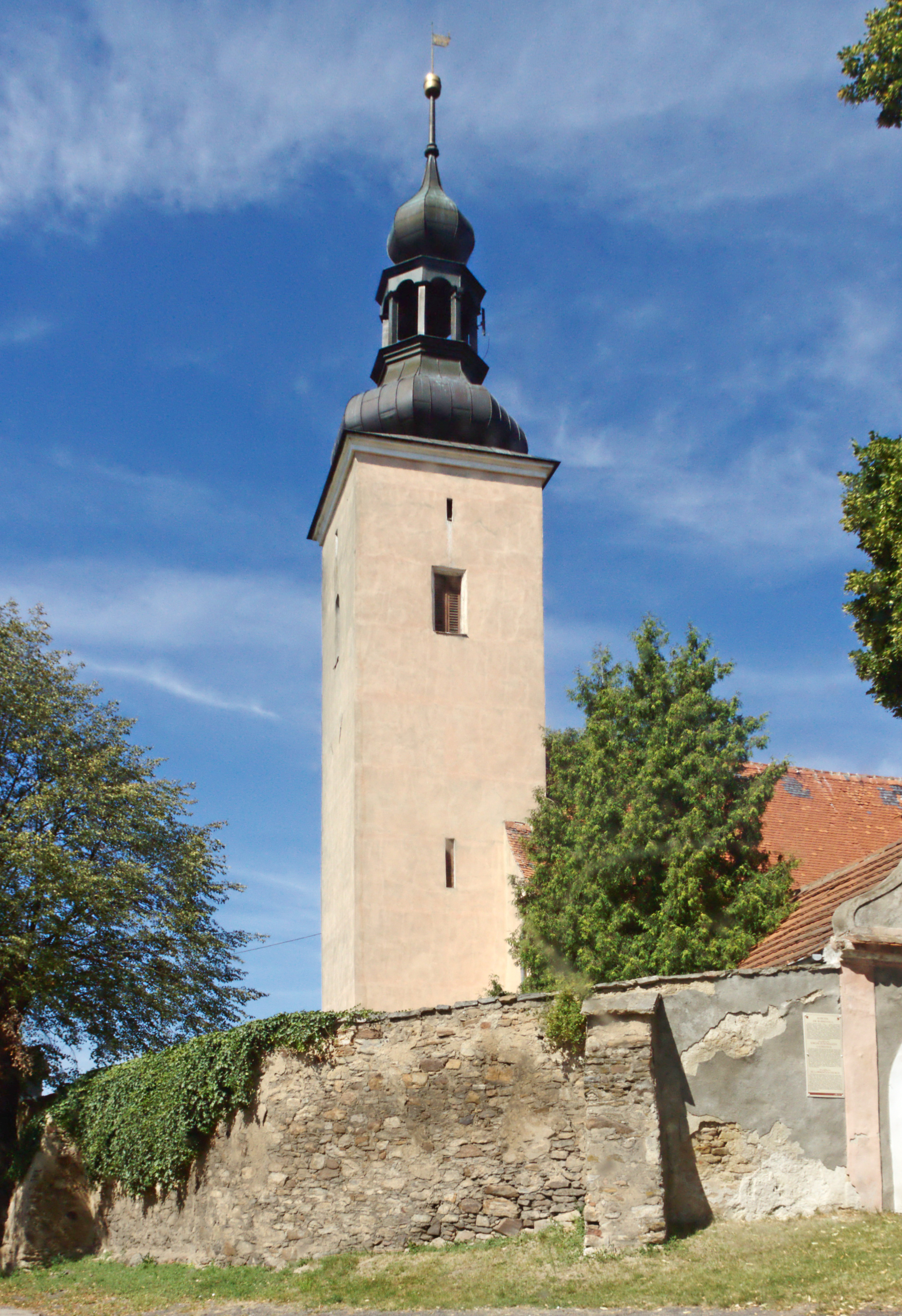
- Saint Lawrence church in Wadochowice

- Location within Poland
- Coordinates: 50°40′35″N 17°01′14″E
- Country: Poland
- Voivodeship: Lower Silesian
- County: Ząbkowice
- Gmina: Ziębice
- Population: 260
- Time zone: UTC+1 (CET)
  - Summer (DST): UTC+2 (CEST)
- Vehicle registration: DZA

Wadochowice [vadɔxɔˈvit͡sɛ] is a village in the administrative district of Gmina Ziębice, within Ząbkowice County, Lower Silesian Voivodeship, in south-western Poland.

Until 1810, the village was a possession of the Cistercian Monastery in nearby Henryków.
