= Biernacice, Lower Silesian Voivodeship =

Biernacice
- Village
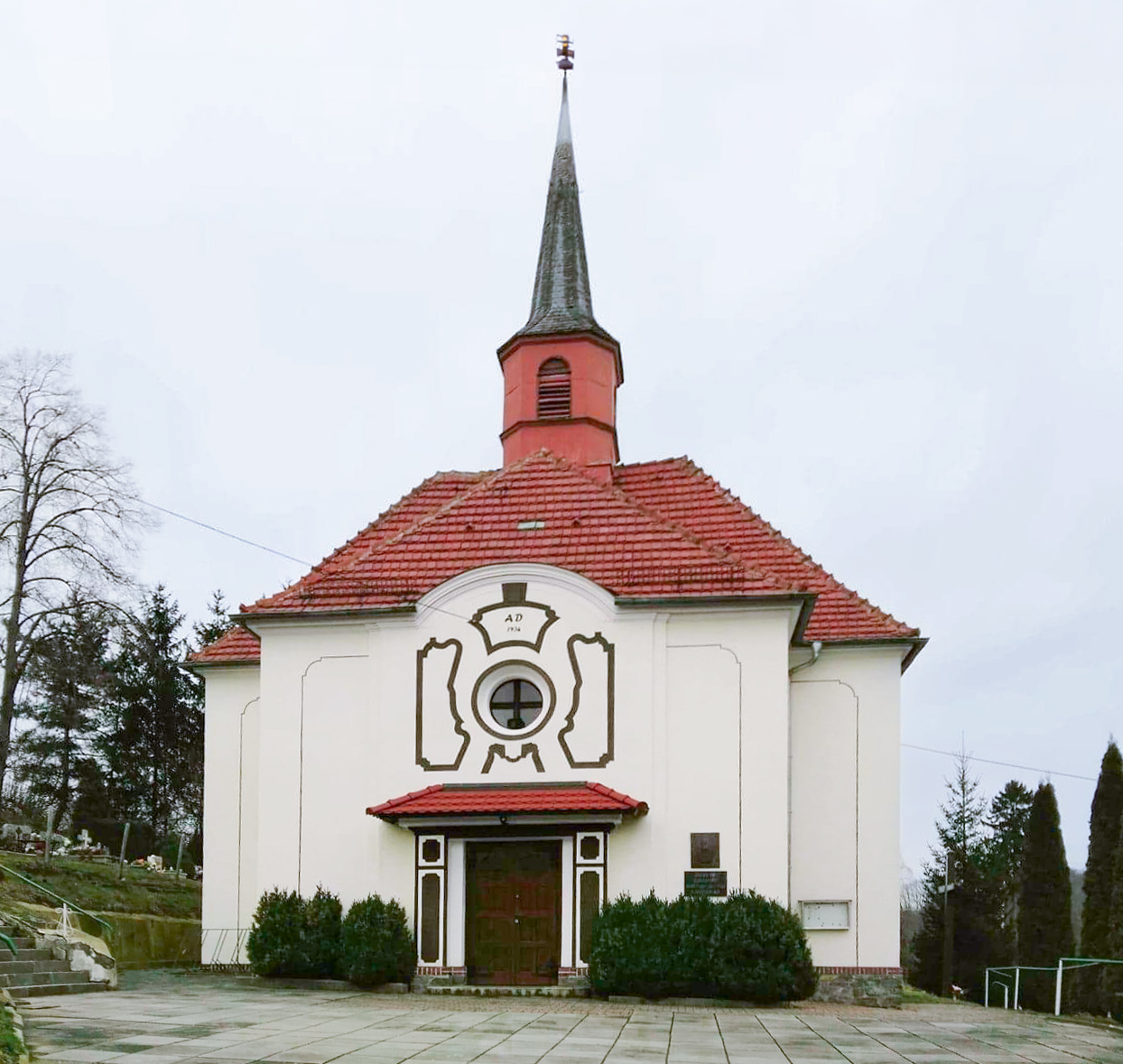
- Kościół Biernacice

- Location within Poland
- Coordinates: 50°34′15″N 17°00′51″E
- Country: Poland
- Voivodeship: Lower Silesian
- County: Ząbkowice
- Gmina: Ziębice

Biernacice [bjɛrnaˈt͡ɕit͡sɛ] is a village in the administrative district of Gmina Ziębice, within Ząbkowice County, Lower Silesian Voivodeship, in south-western Poland.
