= Nowina, Lower Silesian Voivodeship =

Nowina
- Village
- Location within Poland
- Coordinates: 50°41′N 17°6′E
- Country: Poland
- Voivodeship: Lower Silesian
- County: Ząbkowice
- Gmina: Ziębice

Nowina [nɔˈvina] is a village in the administrative district of Gmina Ziębice, within Ząbkowice County, Lower Silesian Voivodeship, in south-western Poland.
