= Starczówek =

- Village
- Location within Poland
- Coordinates: 50°33′03″N 17°03′05″E
- Country: Poland
- Voivodeship: Lower Silesian
- County: Ząbkowice
- Gmina: Ziębice

Starczówek [starˈt͡ʂuvɛk] is a village in the administrative district of Gmina Ziębice, within Ząbkowice County, Lower Silesian Voivodeship, in south-western Poland.
