= Liber fundationis =

Liber fundationis may refer to:

- Liber fundationis claustri Sanctae Mariae Virginis in Heinrichow or Book of Henryków
- Liber fundationis episcopatus Vratislaviensis
