= Krzelków =

- Village
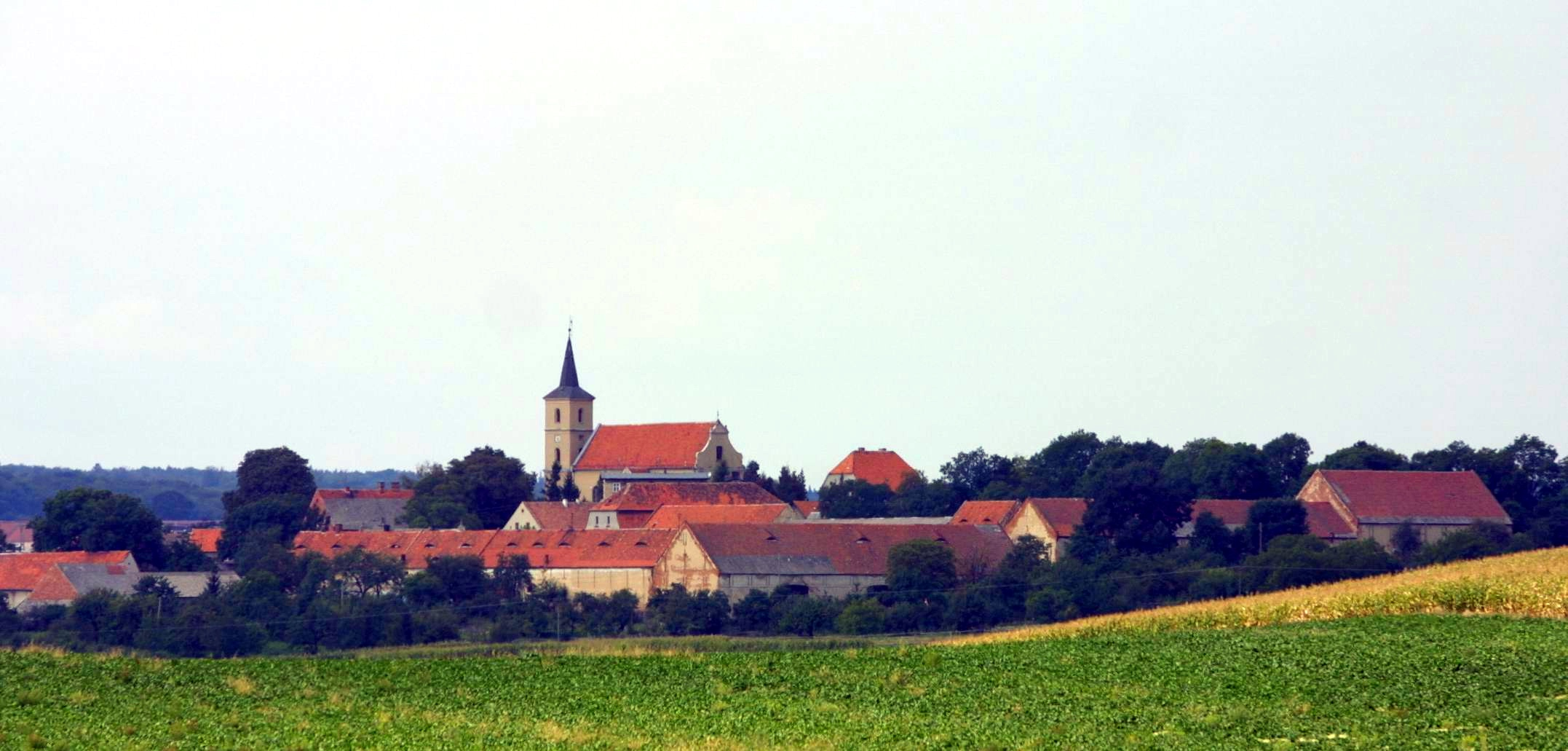
- Krzelków skyline.

- Location within Poland
- Coordinates: 50°38′N 17°0′E
- Country: Poland
- Voivodeship: Lower Silesian
- County: Ząbkowice
- Gmina: Ziębice

Krzelków [ˈkʂɛlkuf] is a village in the administrative district of Gmina Ziębice, within Ząbkowice County, Lower Silesian Voivodeship, in south-western Poland.
