= Lipa, Ząbkowice County =

Lipa
- Village
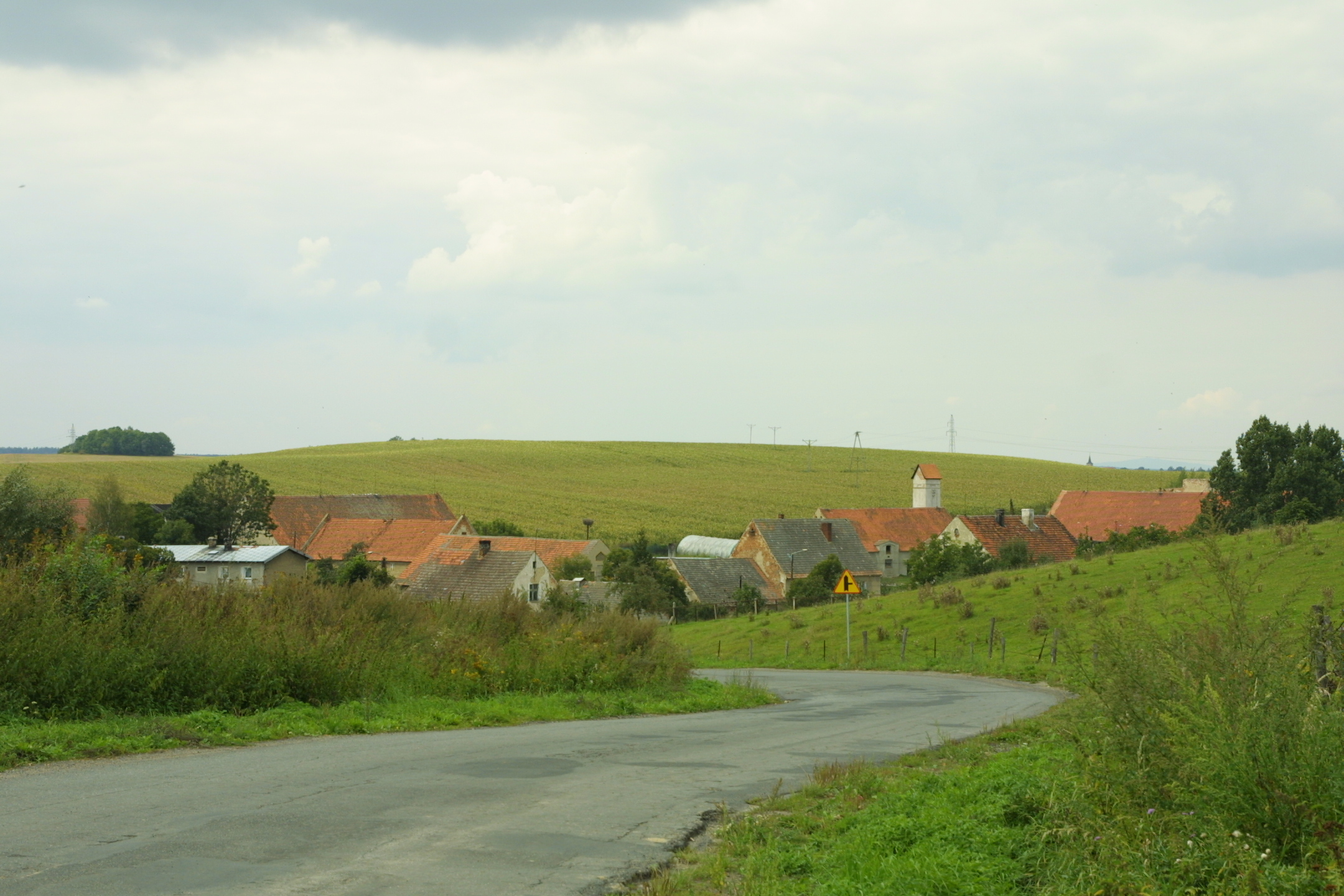
- View of Lipa, Ząbkowice County

- Location within Poland
- Coordinates: 50°36′13″N 17°00′57″E
- Country: Poland
- Voivodeship: Lower Silesian
- County: Ząbkowice
- Gmina: Ziębice

Lipa [ˈlipa] is a village in the administrative district of Gmina Ziębice, within Ząbkowice County, Lower Silesian Voivodeship, in south-western Poland.
