= Kalinowice Górne =

- Village
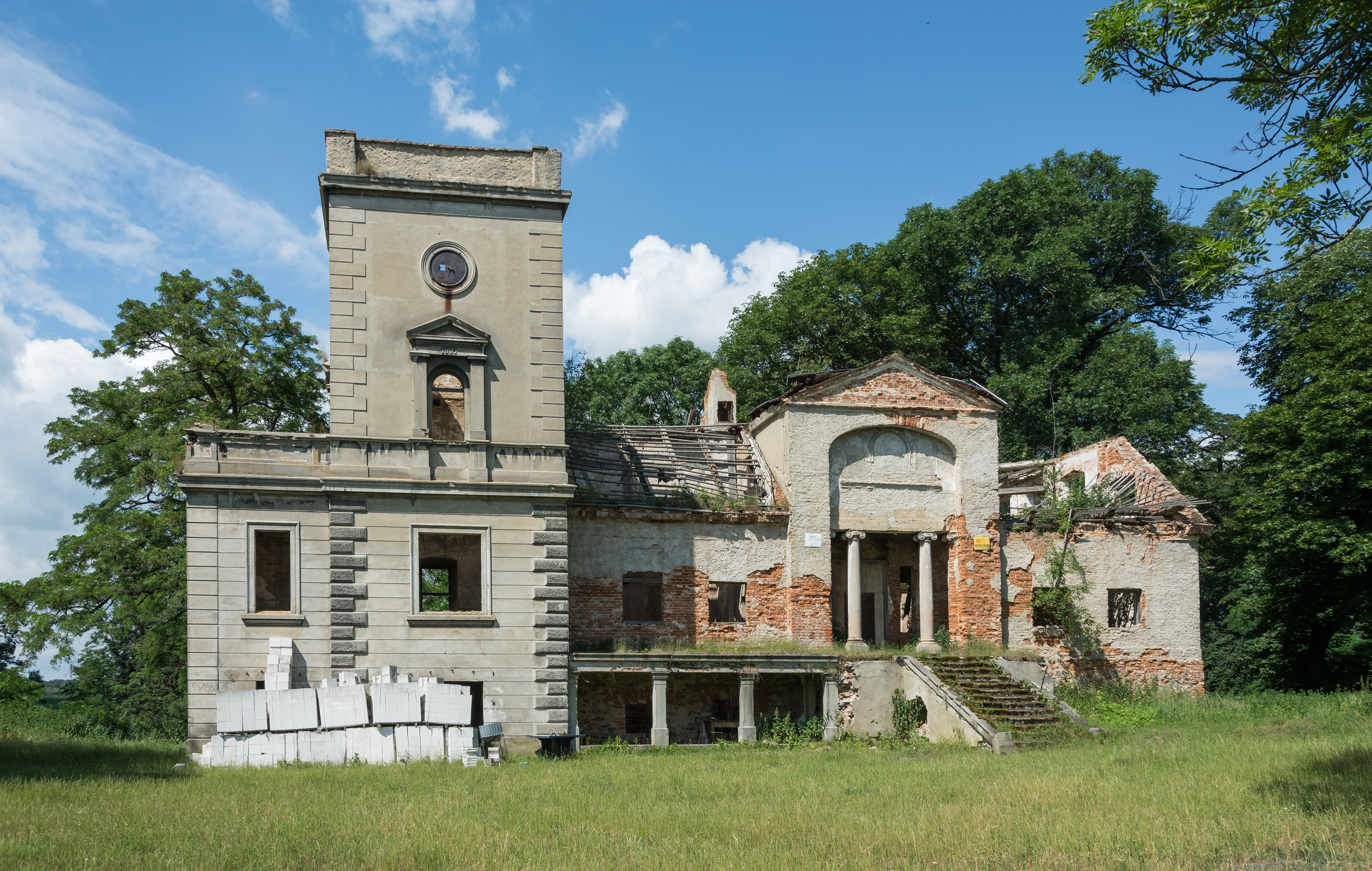

- Location within Poland
- Coordinates: 50°37′58″N 17°04′18″E
- Country: Poland
- Voivodeship: Lower Silesian
- County: Ząbkowice
- Gmina: Ziębice

Kalinowice Górne [kalinɔˈvit͡sɛ ˈɡurnɛ] is a village in the administrative district of Gmina Ziębice, within Ząbkowice County, Lower Silesian Voivodeship, in south-western Poland.
