= Jasienica, Lower Silesian Voivodeship =

Jasienica
- Village
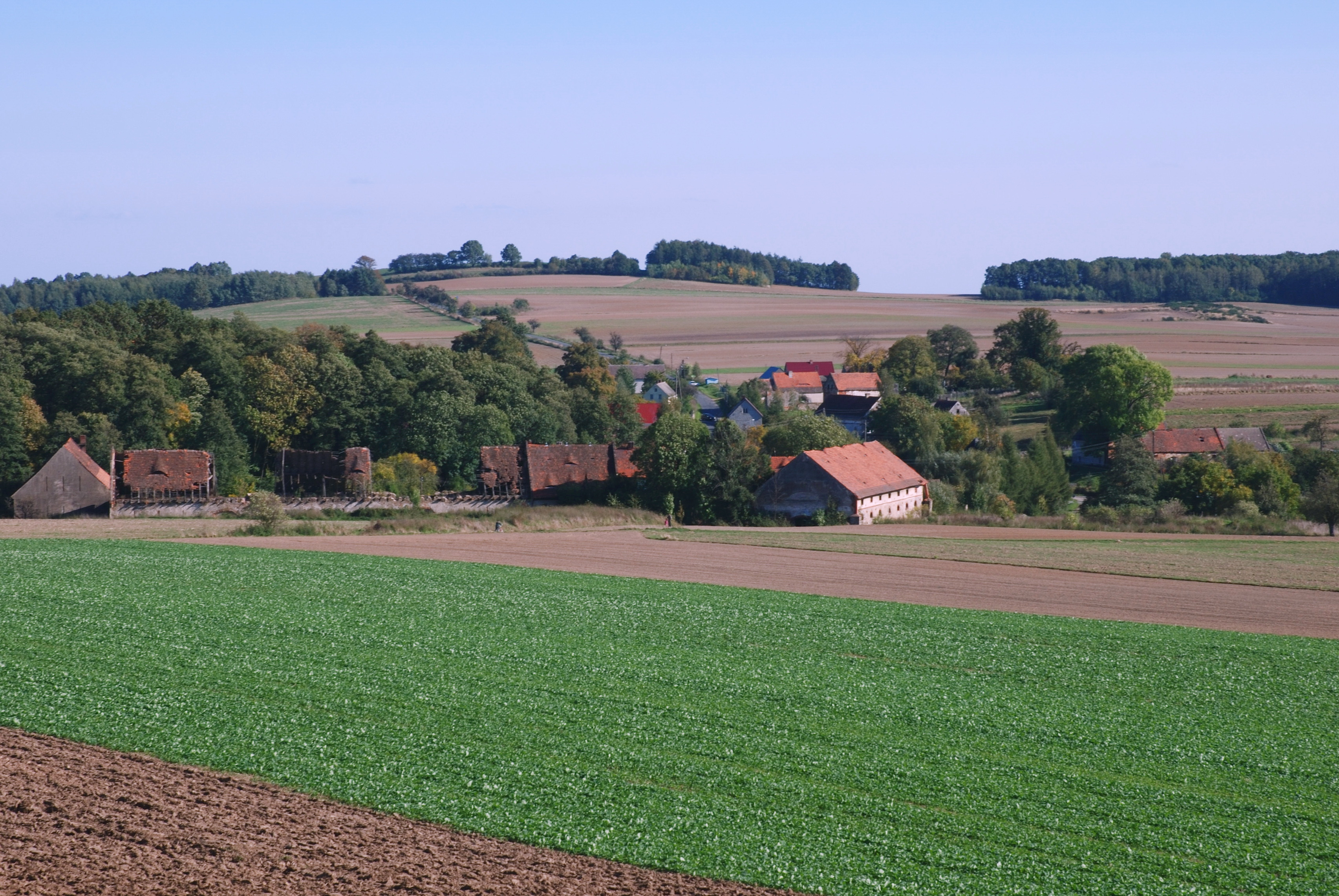
- Jasienica

- Location within Poland
- Coordinates: 50°39′31″N 17°04′37″E
- Country: Poland
- Voivodeship: Lower Silesian
- County: Ząbkowice
- Gmina: Ziębice
- Population: 70
- Time zone: UTC+1 (CET)
  - Summer (DST): UTC+2 (CEST)
- Vehicle registration: DZA

Jasienica [jaɕɛˈnit͡sa] is a village in the administrative district of Gmina Ziębice, within Ząbkowice County, Lower Silesian Voivodeship, in south-western Poland.

The village is the birthplace of German author Christoph Hein.
