= Brukalice =

- Village
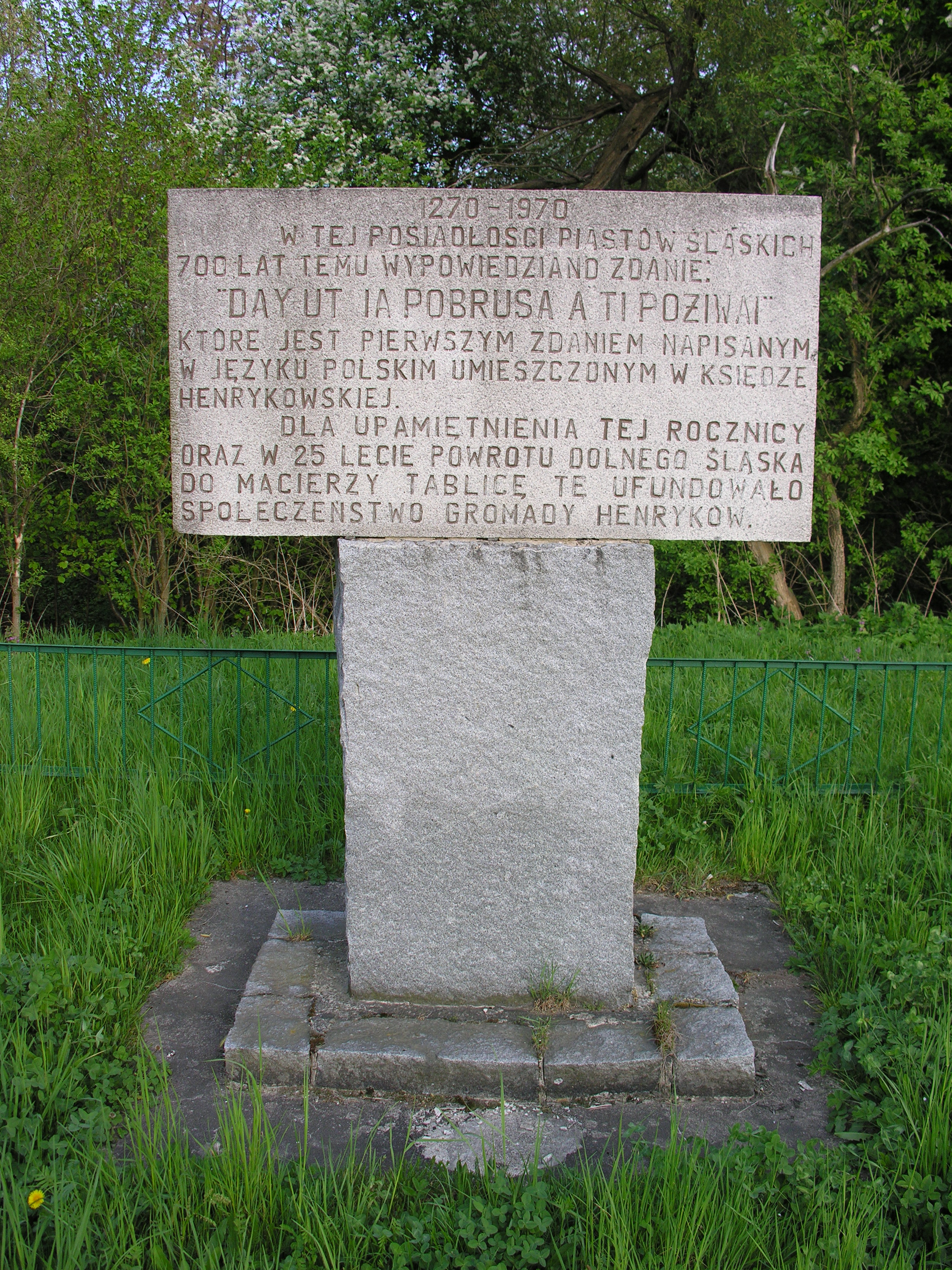
- Monument to the Book of Henryków

- Location within Poland
- Coordinates: 50°39′49″N 17°00′43″E
- Country: Poland
- Voivodeship: Lower Silesian
- County: Ząbkowice
- Gmina: Ziębice
- Founded: 12th century
- Time zone: UTC+1 (CET)
  - Summer (DST): UTC+2 (CEST)
- Vehicle registration: DZA

Brukalice [brukaˈlit͡sɛ] is a village in the administrative district of Gmina Ziębice, within Ząbkowice County, Lower Silesian Voivodeship, in south-western Poland.
