= Skalice, Lower Silesian Voivodeship =

Skalice
- Village
- Location within Poland
- Coordinates: 50°39′N 17°2′E
- Country: Poland
- Voivodeship: Lower Silesian
- County: Ząbkowice
- Gmina: Ziębice
- Population (approx.): 130

Skalice ([skaˈlit͡sɛ]) is a village in the administrative district of Gmina Ziębice, within Ząbkowice County, Lower Silesian Voivodeship, in south-western Poland.
