= Osina Mała, Lower Silesian Voivodeship =

Osina Mała
- Village
- Location within Poland
- Coordinates: 50°35′N 17°9′E
- Country: Poland
- Voivodeship: Lower Silesian
- County: Ząbkowice
- Gmina: Ziębice

Osina Mała [ɔˈɕina ˈmawa] is a village in the administrative district of Gmina Ziębice, within Ząbkowice County, Lower Silesian Voivodeship, in south-western Poland.
