= Pomianów Dolny =

- Village
- Location within Poland
- Coordinates: 50°29′08″N 17°02′52″E
- Country: Poland
- Voivodeship: Lower Silesian
- County: Ząbkowice
- Gmina: Ziębice
- Time zone: UTC+1 (CET)
  - Summer (DST): UTC+2 (CEST)
- Vehicle registration: DZA

Pomianów Dolny [pɔˈmjanuf ˈdɔlnɨ] is a village in the administrative district of Gmina Ziębice, within Ząbkowice County, Lower Silesian Voivodeship, in south-western Poland.
