= Lubnów, Ząbkowice County =

Lubnów
- Village
- Location within Poland
- Coordinates: 50°31′N 17°2′E
- Country: Poland
- Voivodeship: Lower Silesian
- County: Ząbkowice
- Gmina: Ziębice

Lubnów [ˈlubnuf] is a village in the administrative district of Gmina Ziębice, within Ząbkowice County, Lower Silesian Voivodeship, in south-western Poland.

== Attractions ==
An organic farm, called Wagnerówka, welcomes people interested in organic agriculture to visit the farm and its 11 hectares.
