= Raczyce, Ząbkowice County =

Raczyce
- Village
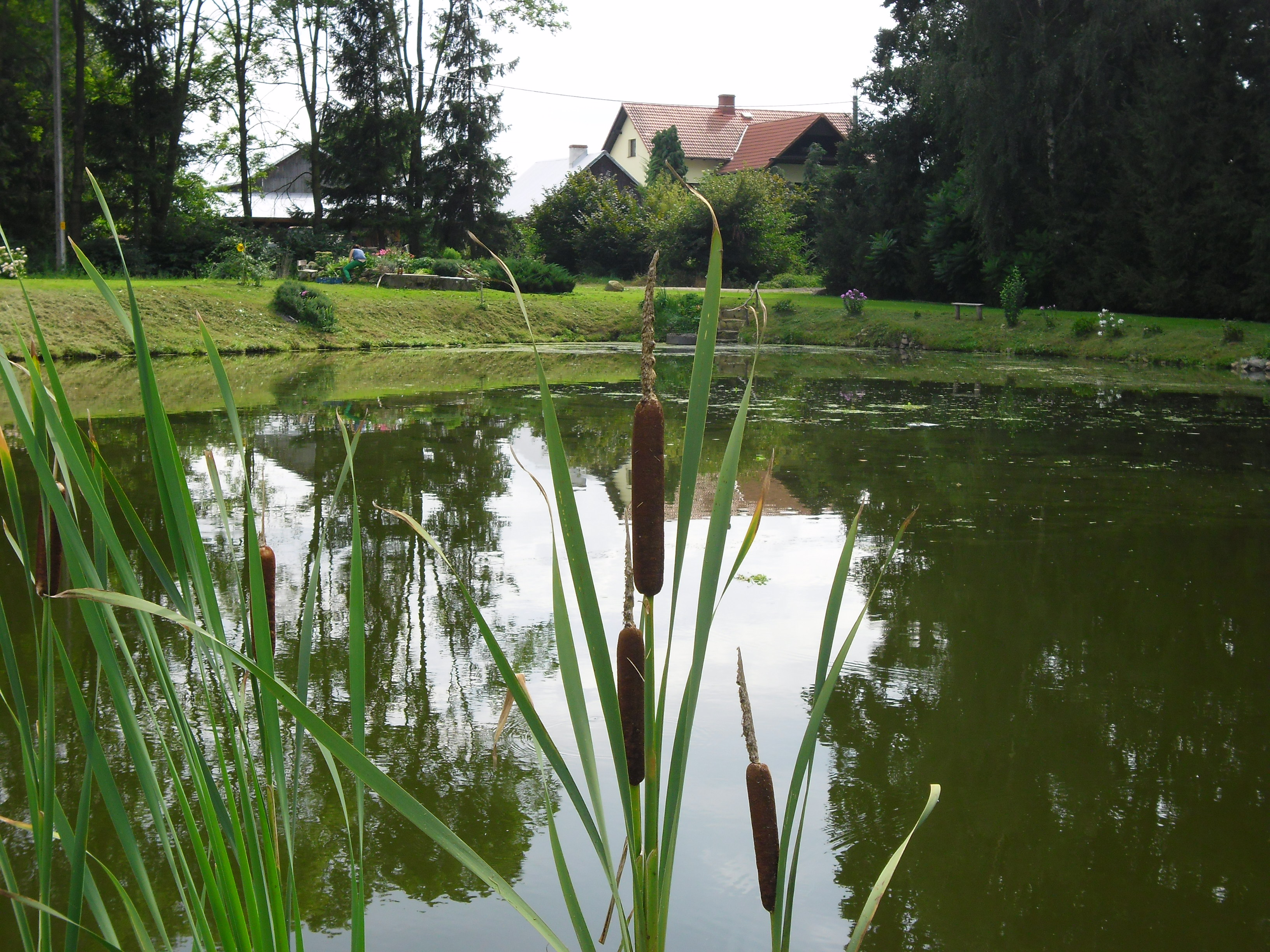

- Location within Poland
- Coordinates: 50°40′N 17°3′E
- Country: Poland
- Voivodeship: Lower Silesian
- County: Ząbkowice
- Gmina: Ziębice

Raczyce [raˈt͡ʂɨt͡sɛ] is a village in the administrative district of Gmina Ziębice, within Ząbkowice County, Lower Silesian Voivodeship, in south-western Poland.
