= Rososznica =

- Village
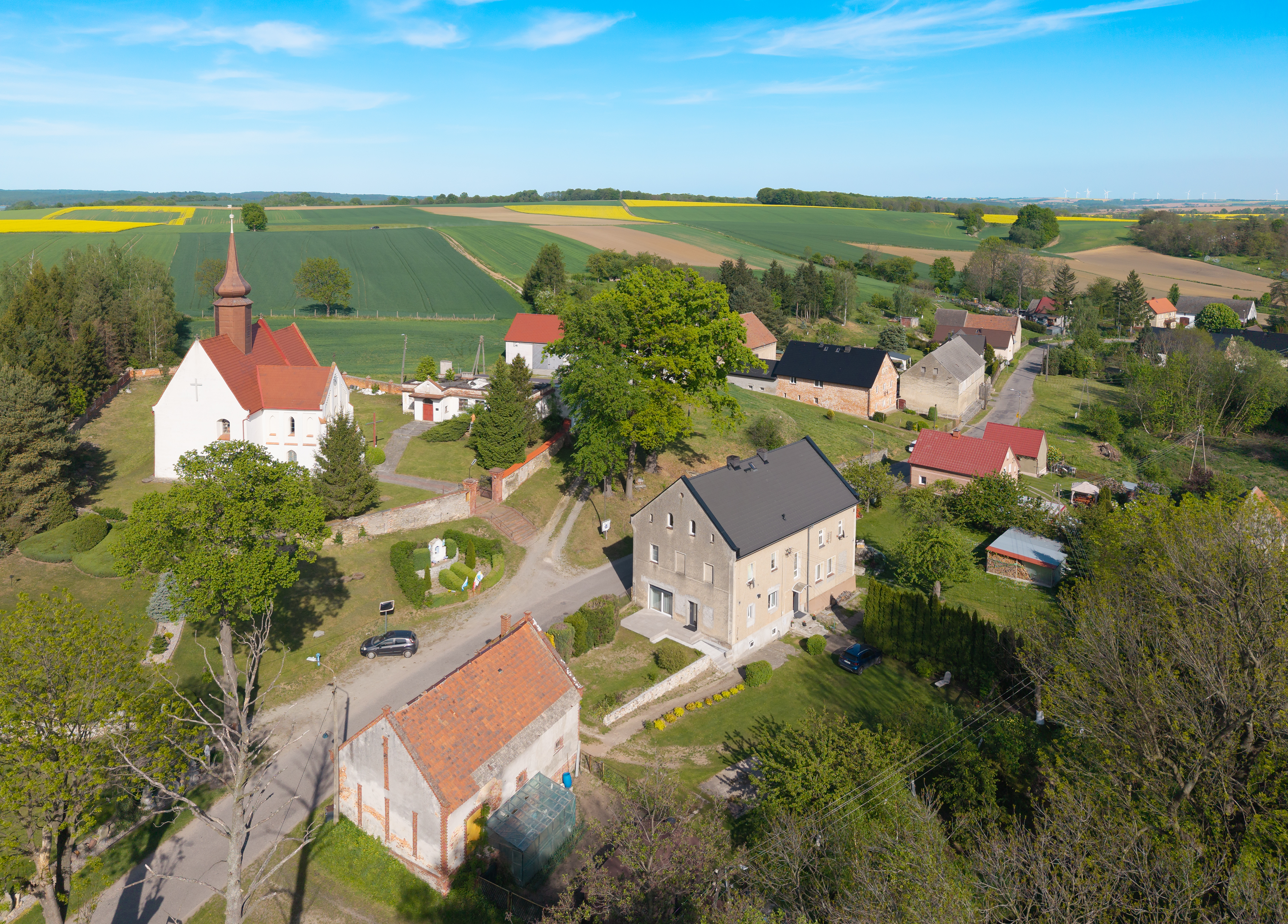

- Location within Poland
- Coordinates: 50°36′N 16°57′E
- Country: Poland
- Voivodeship: Lower Silesian
- County: Ząbkowice
- Gmina: Ziębice

Rososznica [rɔsɔʂˈnit͡sa] is a village in the administrative district of Gmina Ziębice, within Ząbkowice County, Lower Silesian Voivodeship, in south-western Poland.
