= Dębowiec, Lower Silesian Voivodeship =

Dębowiec
- Village
- Location within Poland
- Coordinates: 50°35′47″N 17°04′59″E
- Country: Poland
- Voivodeship: Lower Silesian
- County: Ząbkowice
- Gmina: Ziębice

Dębowiec [dɛmˈbɔvjɛt͡s] is a village in the administrative district of Gmina Ziębice, within Ząbkowice County, Lower Silesian Voivodeship, in south-western Poland.
