= Kalinowice Dolne =

- Village
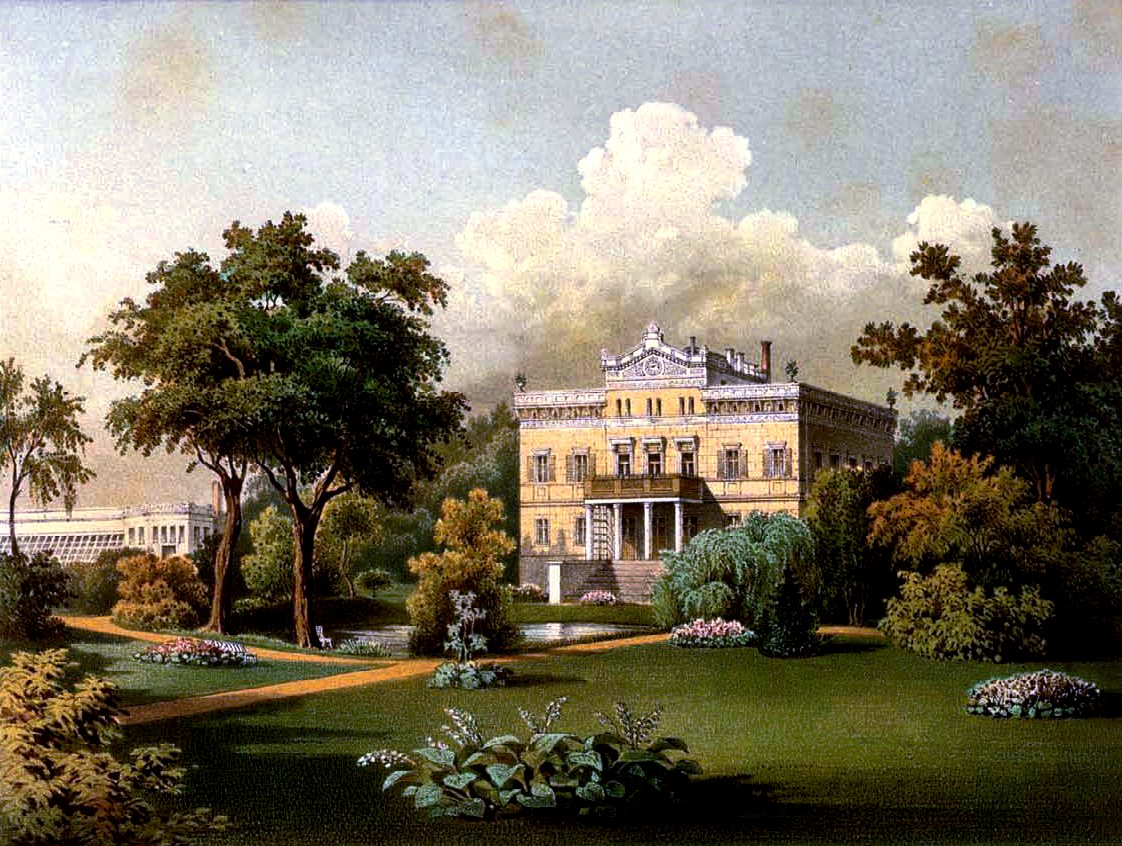
- 19th-century view of the local palace

- Location within Poland
- Coordinates: 50°37′36″N 17°05′29″E
- Country: Poland
- Voivodeship: Lower Silesian
- County: Ząbkowice
- Gmina: Ziębice
- Time zone: UTC+1 (CET)
  - Summer (DST): UTC+2 (CEST)
- Vehicle registration: DZA

Kalinowice Dolne [kalinɔˈvit͡sɛ ˈdɔlnɛ] is a village in the administrative district of Gmina Ziębice, within Ząbkowice County, Lower Silesian Voivodeship, in south-western Poland.

== Notable residents ==
Karl Denke (1860-1924), German serial murderer
