= Niedźwiedź, Lower Silesian Voivodeship =

Niedźwiedź
- Village
- Location within Poland
- Coordinates: 50°32′17″N 17°00′12″E
- Country: Poland
- Voivodeship: Lower Silesian
- County: Ząbkowice
- Gmina: Ziębice

Niedźwiedź [ˈɲɛd͡ʑvjɛt͡ɕ] is a village in the administrative district of Gmina Ziębice, within Ząbkowice County, Lower Silesian Voivodeship, in south-western Poland.
