= Niedźwiednik =

Niedźwiednik may refer to the following places in Poland:

- Niedźwiednik, Lower Silesian Voivodeship in Gmina Ziębice, Ząbkowice County in Lower Silesian Voivodeship (SW Poland)
- Niedźwiednik, a peak in the Giant Mountains
