= Witostowice =

- Village
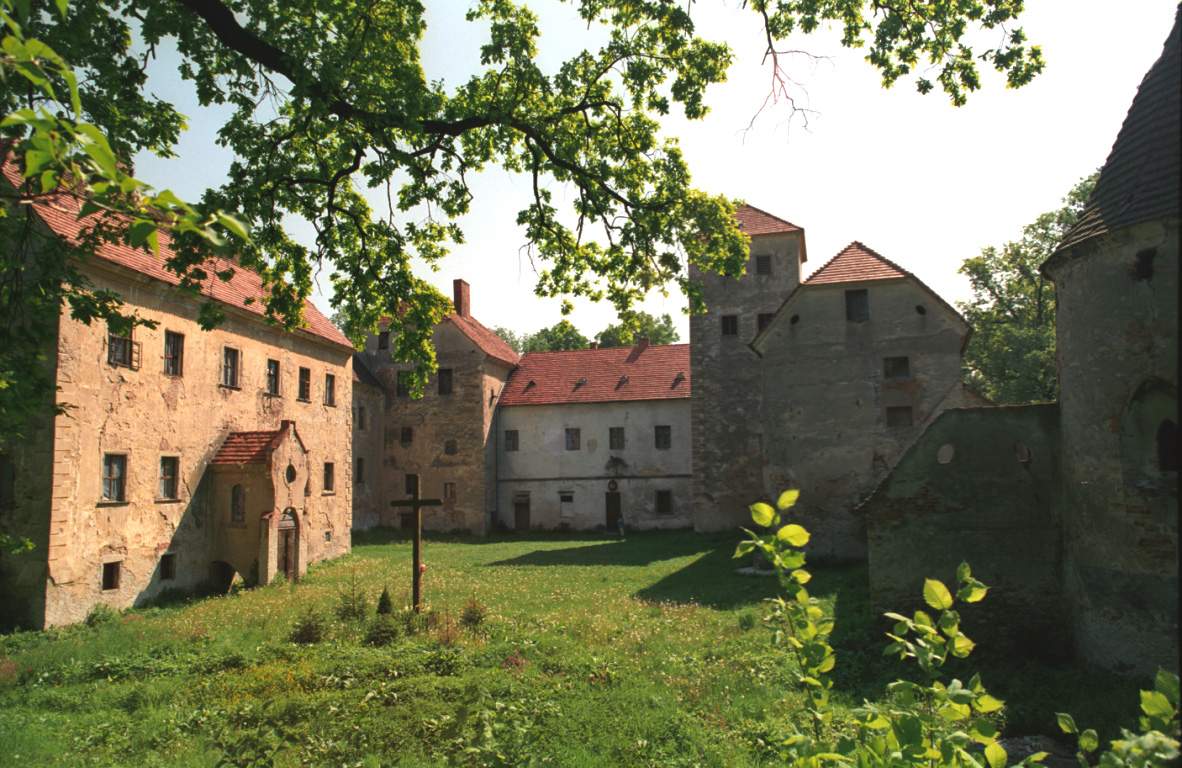

- Location within Poland
- Coordinates: 50°40′59″N 17°49′20″E
- Country: Poland
- Voivodeship: Lower Silesian
- County: Ząbkowice
- Gmina: Ziębice

Witostowice [vitɔstɔˈvit͡sɛ] is a village in the administrative district of Gmina Ziębice, within Ząbkowice County, Lower Silesian Voivodeship, in south-western Poland.
