= Czerńczyce =

Czerńczyce may refer to the following places in Poland:

- Czerńczyce, Wrocław County (in Gmina Kąty Wrocławskie), in Lower Silesian Voivodeship (SW Poland)
- Czerńczyce, Ząbkowice County (in Gmina Ziębice), in Lower Silesian Voivodeship (SW Poland)
