= Gmina Ziębice =

Gmina Ziębice Ziębice Commune
- Gmina
- Flag Coat of arms
- Interactive map of Gmina Ziębice
- Coordinates (Ziębice): 50°36′N 17°02′E
- Country: Poland
- Voivodeship: Lower Silesian
- County: Ząbkowice
- Seat: Ziębice
- Sołectwos: Biernacice, Bożnowice, Brukalice, Czerńczyce, Dębowiec, Głęboka, Henryków, Jasienica, Kalinowice Dolne, Kalinowice Górne, Krzelków, Lipa, Lubnów, Niedźwiednik, Niedźwiedź, Nowina, Nowy Dwór, Osina Mała, Osina Wielka, Pomianów Dolny, Raczyce, Rososznica, Skalice, Służejów, Starczówek, Wadochowice, Wigancice, Witostowice

Area
  - Total: 222.24 km^{2} (85.81 sq mi)

Population (2019-06-30)
  - Total: 17,001
  - Density: 76.498/km^{2} (198.13/sq mi)
  - Urban: 8,708
  - Rural: 8,293
- Website: http://www.ziebice.pl

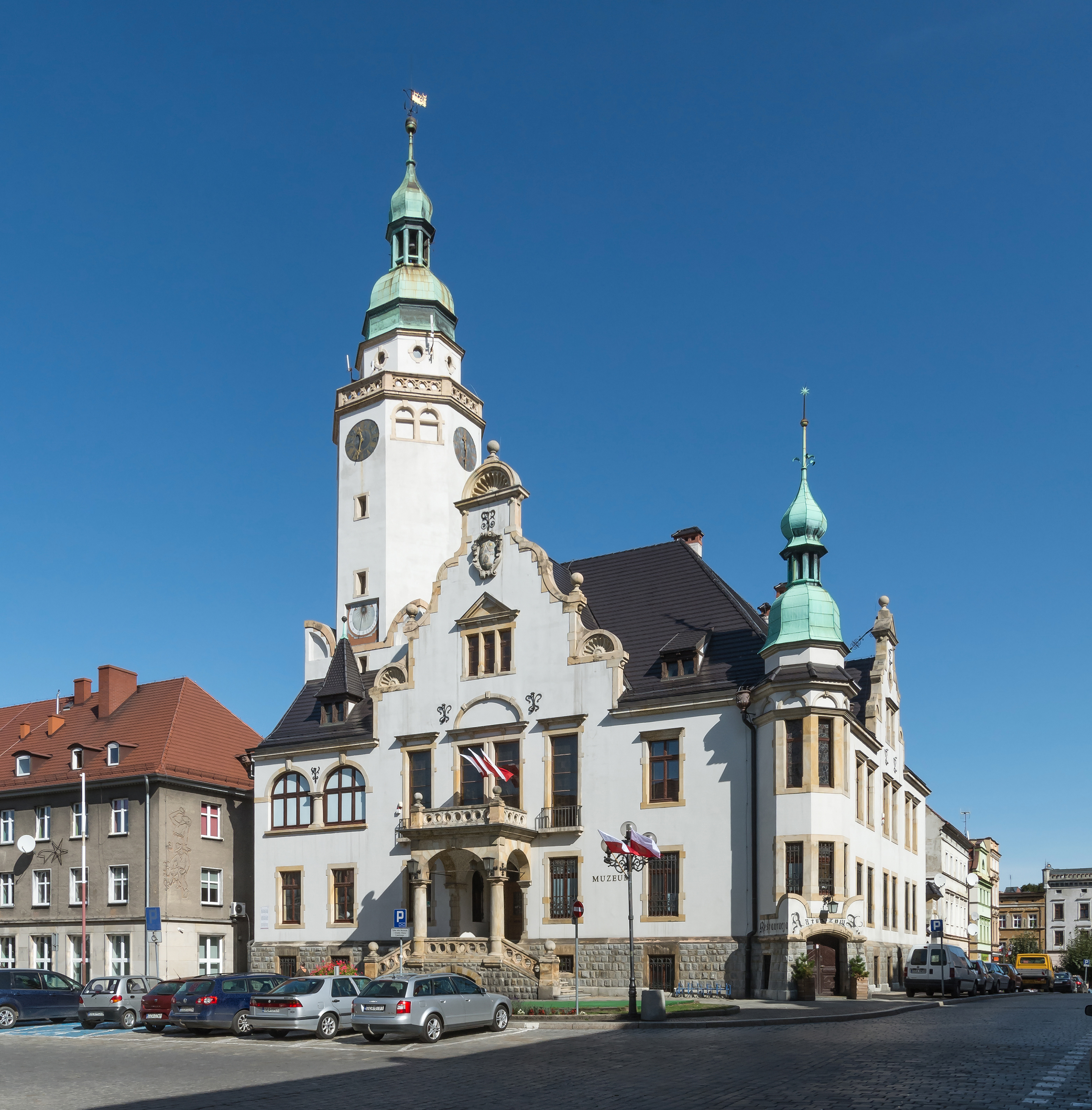
Ziębice

Gmina Ziębice is an urban-rural gmina (administrative district) in Ząbkowice County, Lower Silesian Voivodeship, in south-western Poland. Its seat is the town of Ziębice, which lies approximately 16 kilometres (10 mi) east of Ząbkowice Śląskie, and 59 kilometres (37 mi) south of the regional capital Wrocław.

The gmina covers an area of 222.24 square kilometres (85.8 sq mi), and as of 2019 its total population is 17,001.

== Neighbouring gminas ==
Gmina Ziębice is bordered by the gminas of Ciepłowody, Kamieniec Ząbkowicki, Kamiennik, Otmuchów, Paczków, Przeworno, Strzelin and Ząbkowice Śląskie.

== Villages ==
Apart from the town of Ziębice, the gmina contains the villages of Biernacice, Bożnowice, Brukalice, Czerńczyce, Dębowiec, Głęboka, Henryków, Jasienica, Kalinowice Dolne, Kalinowice Górne, Krzelków, Lipa, Lubnów, Niedźwiednik, Niedźwiedź, Nowina, Nowy Dwór, Osina Mała, Osina Wielka, Pomianów Dolny, Raczyce, Rososznica, Skalice, Służejów, Starczówek, Wadochowice, Wigancice and Witostowice.

== Twin towns – sister cities ==
Gmina Ziębice is twinned with:

- Brighton, United States
- Ebreichsdorf, Austria
- Jaroměř, Czech Republic
