= Czerńczyce, Ząbkowice County =

Czerńczyce
- Village
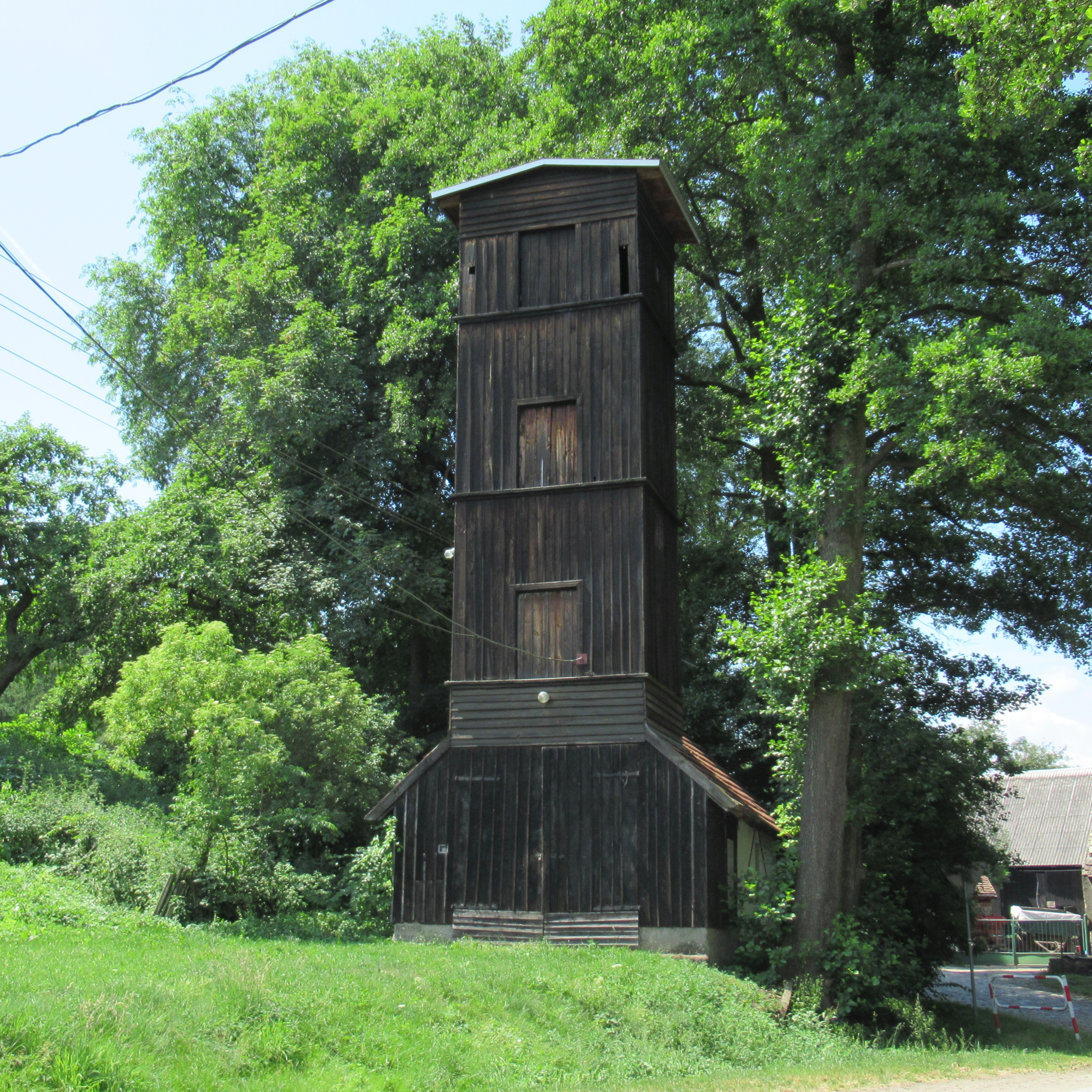

- Location within Poland
- Coordinates: 50°37′05″N 16°56′55″E
- Country: Poland
- Voivodeship: Lower Silesian
- County: Ząbkowice
- Gmina: Ziębice

Czerńczyce [t͡ʂɛrɲˈt͡ʂɨt͡sɛ] is a village in the administrative district of Gmina Ziębice, within Ząbkowice County, Lower Silesian Voivodeship, in south-western Poland.
