= Niedźwiednik, Lower Silesian Voivodeship =

Niedźwiednik
- Village
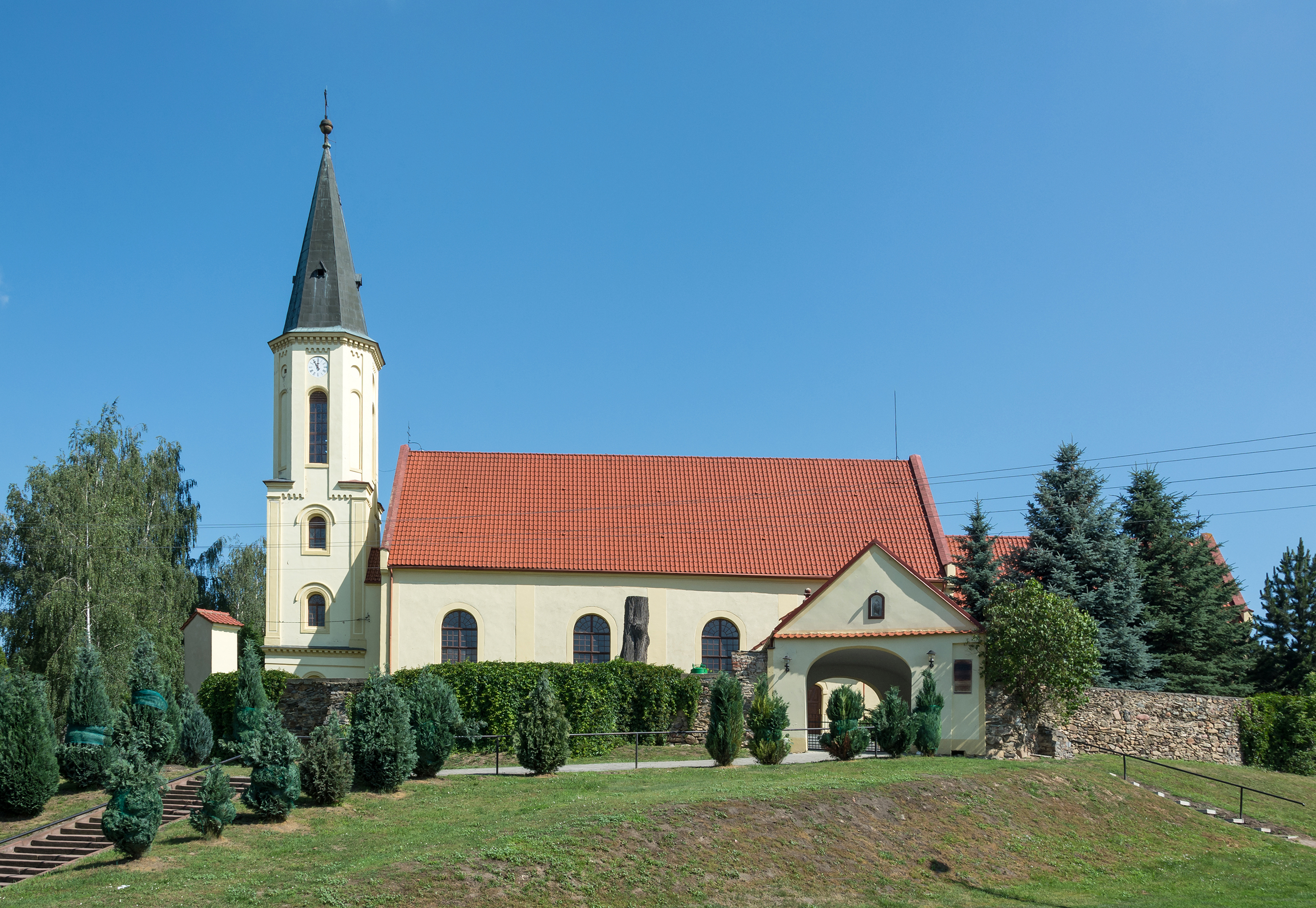

- Location within Poland
- Coordinates: 50°35′05″N 16°57′01″E
- Country: Poland
- Voivodeship: Lower Silesian
- County: Ząbkowice
- Gmina: Ziębice

Niedźwiednik [ɲɛd͡ʑˈvjɛdnik] is a village in the administrative district of Gmina Ziębice, within Ząbkowice County, Lower Silesian Voivodeship, in south-western Poland.
