= Cistercian Monastery Complex in Henryków =

Monastery complex in Henryków, Poland

Cistercian Monastery in Henryków
- Opactwo Cystersów w Henrykowie
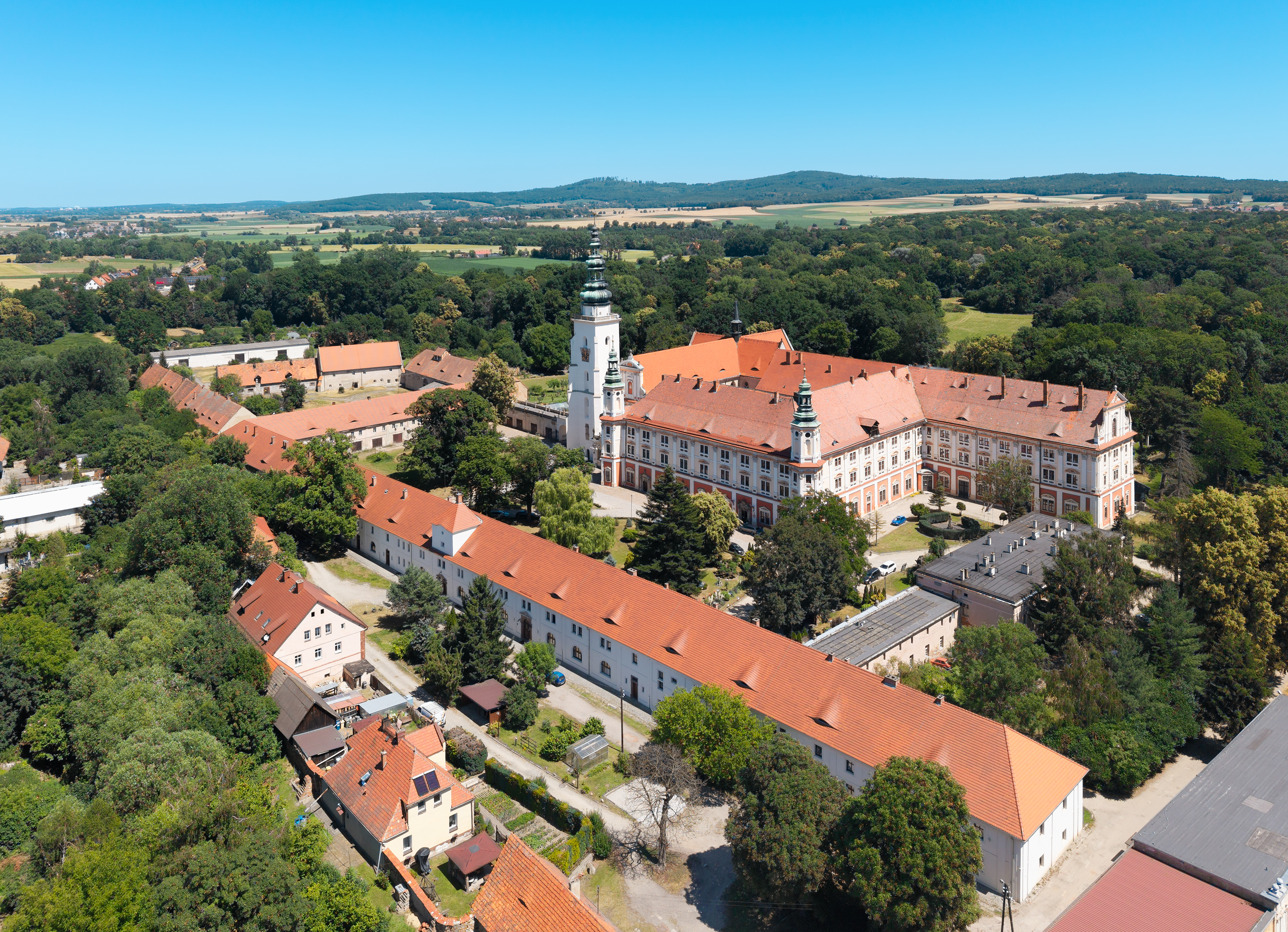
- Cistercian Monastery in Henryków

- Location within Poland

Monastery information
- Order: Cistercians
- Established: 1227

People
- Founder: Henry II the Pious

Architecture
- Style: Baroque

Site
- Location: Henryków
- Country: Poland
- Coordinates: 50.6528°N 17.0138°E

The Cistercian Monastery Complex in Henryków is a post-Cistercian Baroque monastery complex containing the Church of the Assumption of the Blessed Virgin Mary and St. John the Baptist located in Henryków, Poland. The old buildings are cultural heritage sites.

It is a Baroque building located in Silesia, the place where the Book of Henryków was written. Nowadays, the monastery of Henryków functions as the prior of the abbey of Szczyrzyc. Currently, the monastery buildings house, among others, Annus Propedeuticus – a branch of the Metropolitan Theological Seminary in Wrocław (until 2018) and the Blessed Edmund Bojanowski Catholic High School.

== History of the abbey ==
=== Origin and development of the monastery ===
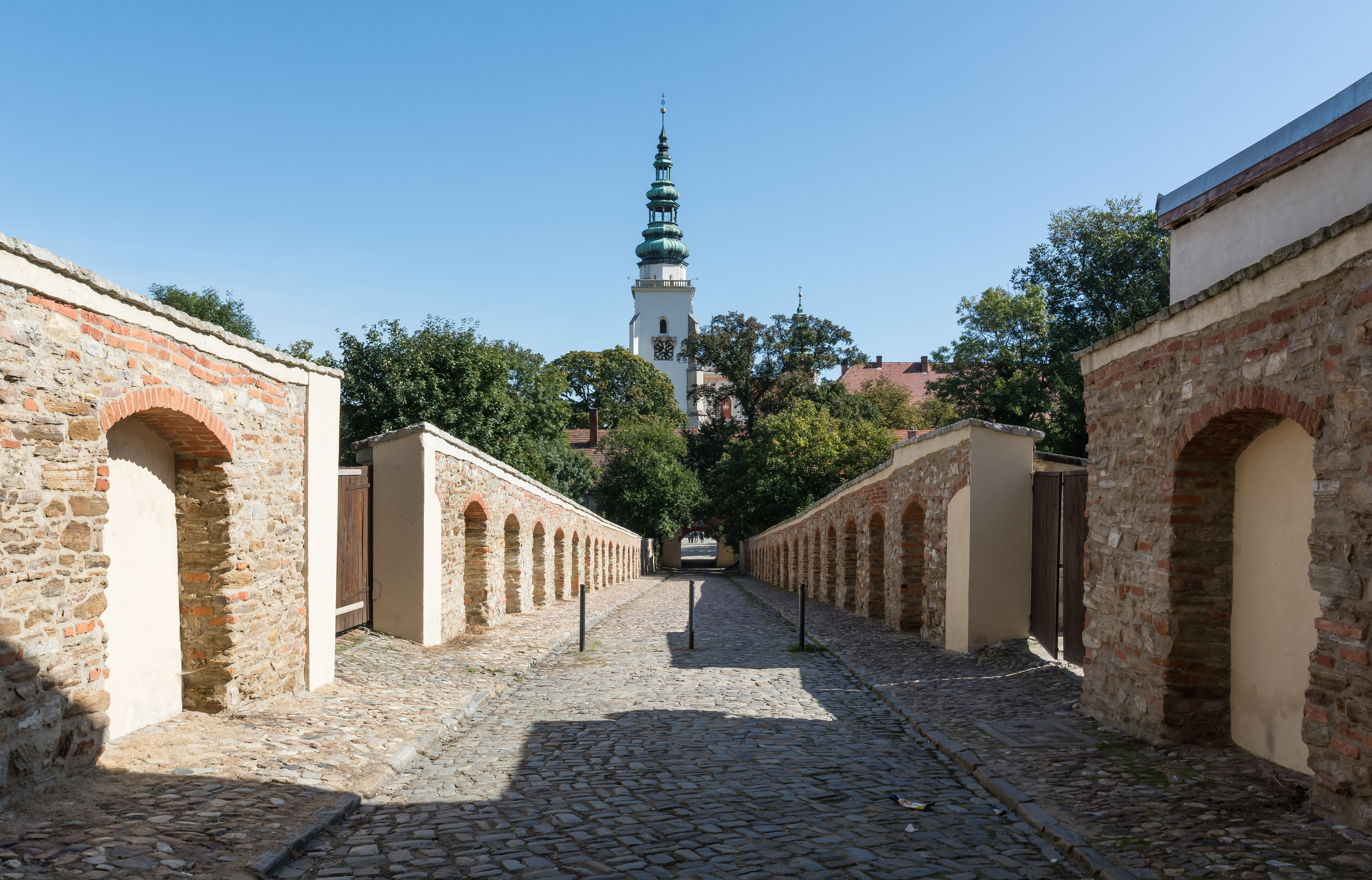
View of the Henryków Abbey from the main gate

The origins of the Henryków Abbey date back to 1222. It was then that Duke Henry I the Bearded gave Nicholas, the canon of the cathedral in Wrocław, the permission to establish a Cistercian order in Henryków, a branch of the abbey in Lubiąż, in the valley of the Oława river. Nicholas was the originator of the settlement of the Cistercians in Henryków, while the official founder of the abbey was Duke Henry II the Pious, son of Henry the Bearded. This means that the Henryków Abbey had the patronage of Silesian dukes, which was a guarantee of its development.

The first monks came to Henryków on 28 May 1227. Nine monks from Lubiąż led by the abbot Henry. In 1228 the foundation document of the monastery was issued, which at the same time defined its equipment. It was not very impressive in comparison with other abbeys. In 1228 the first wooden monastery church was consecrated. Despite the modest resources the monastery developed quite dynamically, increasing its possessions. This development was interrupted by the first Mongol invasion of Poland in 1241, during which the church and monastery were burned down and looted. The situation of the monastery was additionally worsened by the death of Duke Henry the Pious in the battle of Legnica.

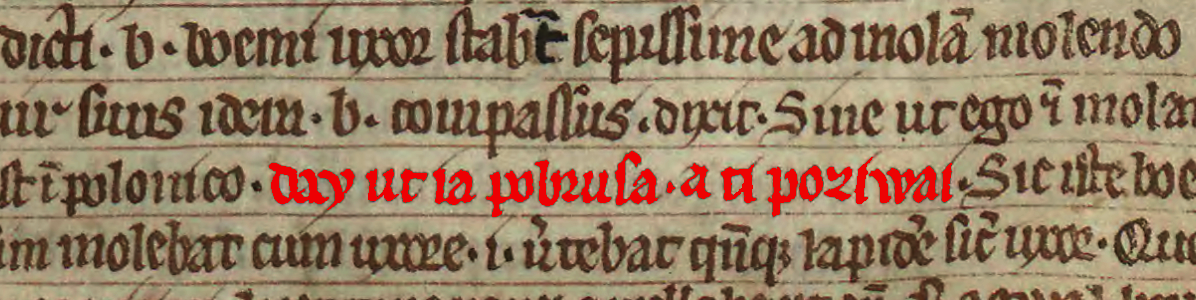
Excerpt from the Book of Henryków

After the Mongol invasion the Cistercians focused on rebuilding their monastery and recovering their property. In order to put the monastery in order, the abbot Peter wrote a document called Liber fundationis claustri Sancte Marie Virginis in Henrichow, which organized the affairs of the monastery. This document, called the Book of Henryków, is one of the most valuable relics of Polish writing – it contains the first sentence written in Polish in any document.

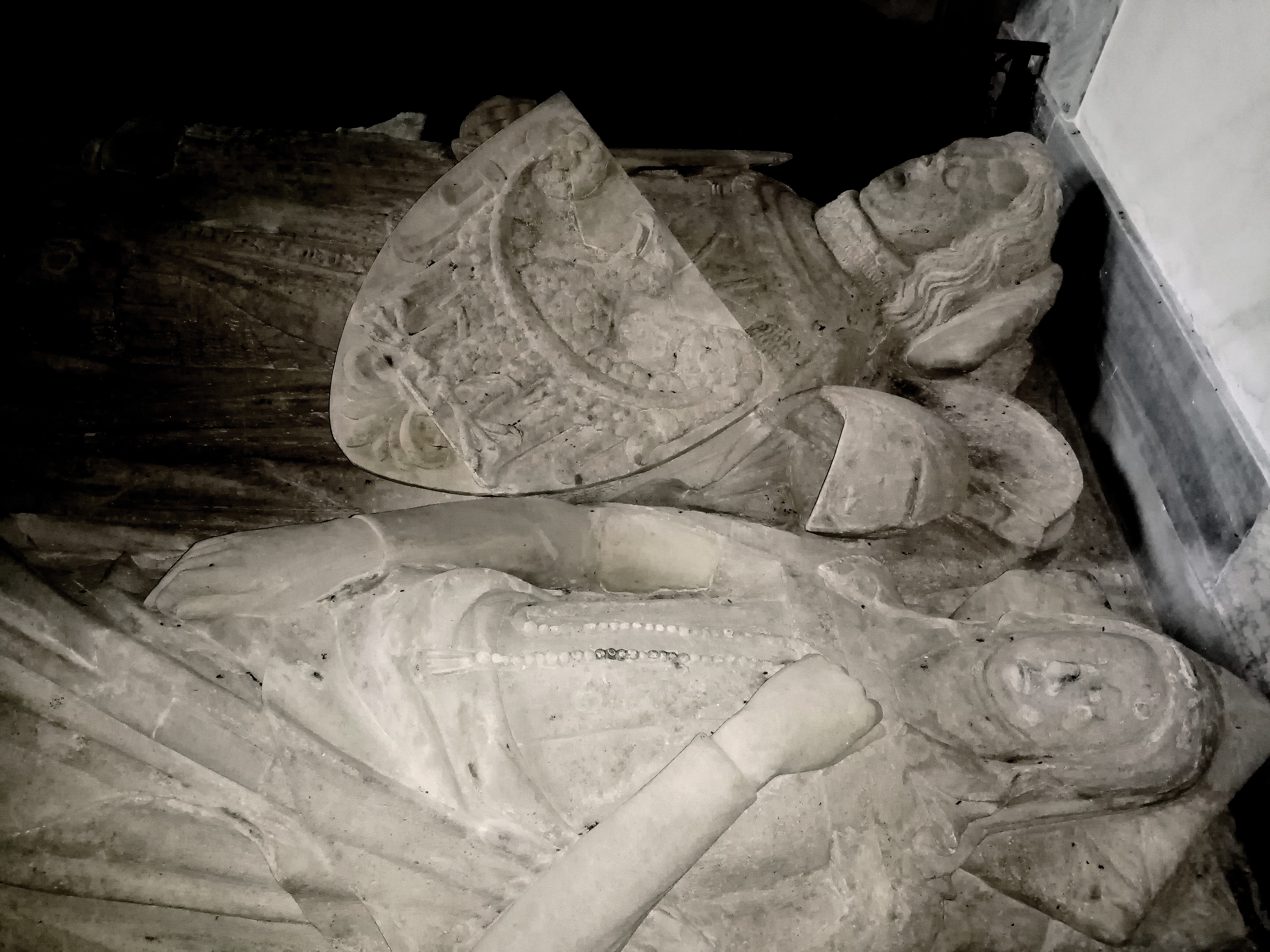
Tomb of Duke Bolko II of Ziębice and his wife

The Cistercians from Henryków spent the following years strengthening their position in the region. They derived their income mainly from the agricultural lands and crafts. Their growing position is proved by the foundation of the branch of the abbey in Krzeszów in 1292. In 1304 they started the construction of a new Gothic monastery church. Moreover, the dukes of Ziębice turned the Henryków monastery into a family necropolis. In 1341, Duke Bolko II of Ziębice was buried in the monastery, and shortly afterwards his wife. The monastery's prosperity was worsened by the Hussite Wars, which ravaged the abbey in the years 1427–1430. The monastery was burnt down and looted, and the monks fled to Nysa and Wrocław. After the end of the Hussite Wars, the rebuilt monastery was destroyed several more times in the 15th century. In 1438 it was destroyed by the army of Sigismund von Reichenau, and in 1459 by the invading Czech troops of King George of Poděbrady.

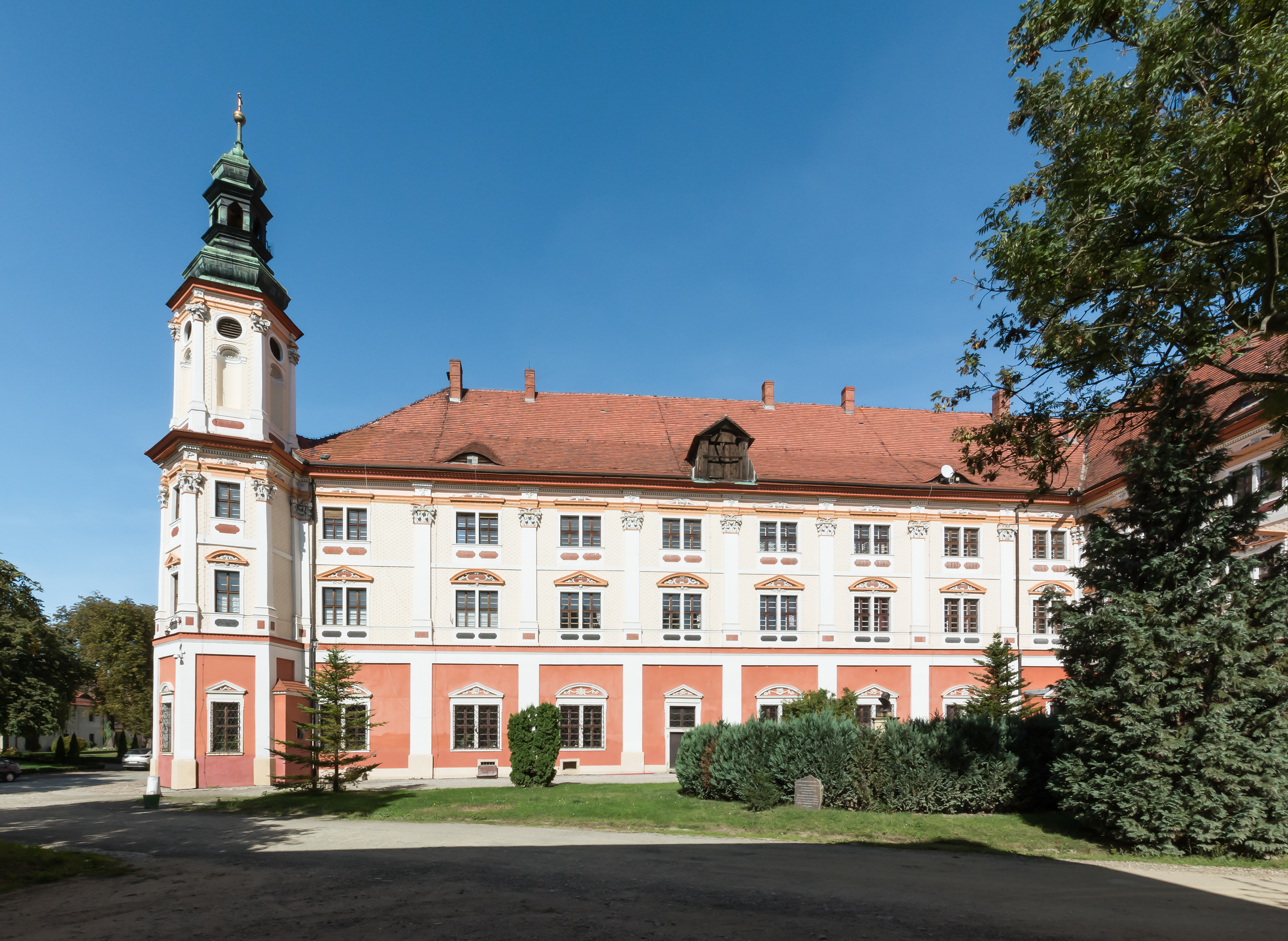
Monastery building

The monastery underwent gradual development from the middle of the 16th century. Abbot Andrew had a significant contribution, which resulted in the construction of Renaissance elements of the monastery buildings. During that time, the abbot of the Cistercians from Ląd also carried out reforms in discipline and monastic work. It contributed to improvement of the condition of the monastery. Abbot Wincenty from Strzelin also strove for further reform of the monastery. The monks were ordered to lock their dormitories for the night, they were forbidden to meet for food and drink, and to engage in pointless disputes after the evening assembly. Women were also forbidden to enter the cloister. In parallel with spiritual renewal, economic reconstruction was carried out. The monastery was given permission to run an inn outside its premises and the right to brew beer. An important aspect of the development of the monastery was settling it by German monks, who came from the abbeys in Greater Poland – Ląd, Obra and Wągrowiec – where the process of Polonization of abbeys was carried out. The development of the Henryków Abbey was interrupted by the Thirty Years' War, when the monastery was looted and burned down. A significant part of the original monastery library was also destroyed. The extent of the damage was completed by the plague, which broke out in the abbey in 1633.

=== Significance to local Ostsiedlung ===
Traditionally, German historians saw the monks as harbinger western economy and technology to the region in the context of Medieval Ostsiedlung. These authors point out that on the vast swaths of uncultivated land granted to the Abbey, many villages according to German law spread up. Polish researchers have pointed out that the deeds do not contain any instruction for colonization. However, while it is true that all villages were founded on Polish predecessor settlements the monks' work amounted to a revolutionary change in local economic structure. For example, the small-scale Polish villages structure was concentrated to larger villages that carried Polish names but really amounted to new settlements. The success of the abbey's management is corroborated by that local Polish noblemen gave their lands to the Abbey for cultivation.

=== The glory years ===
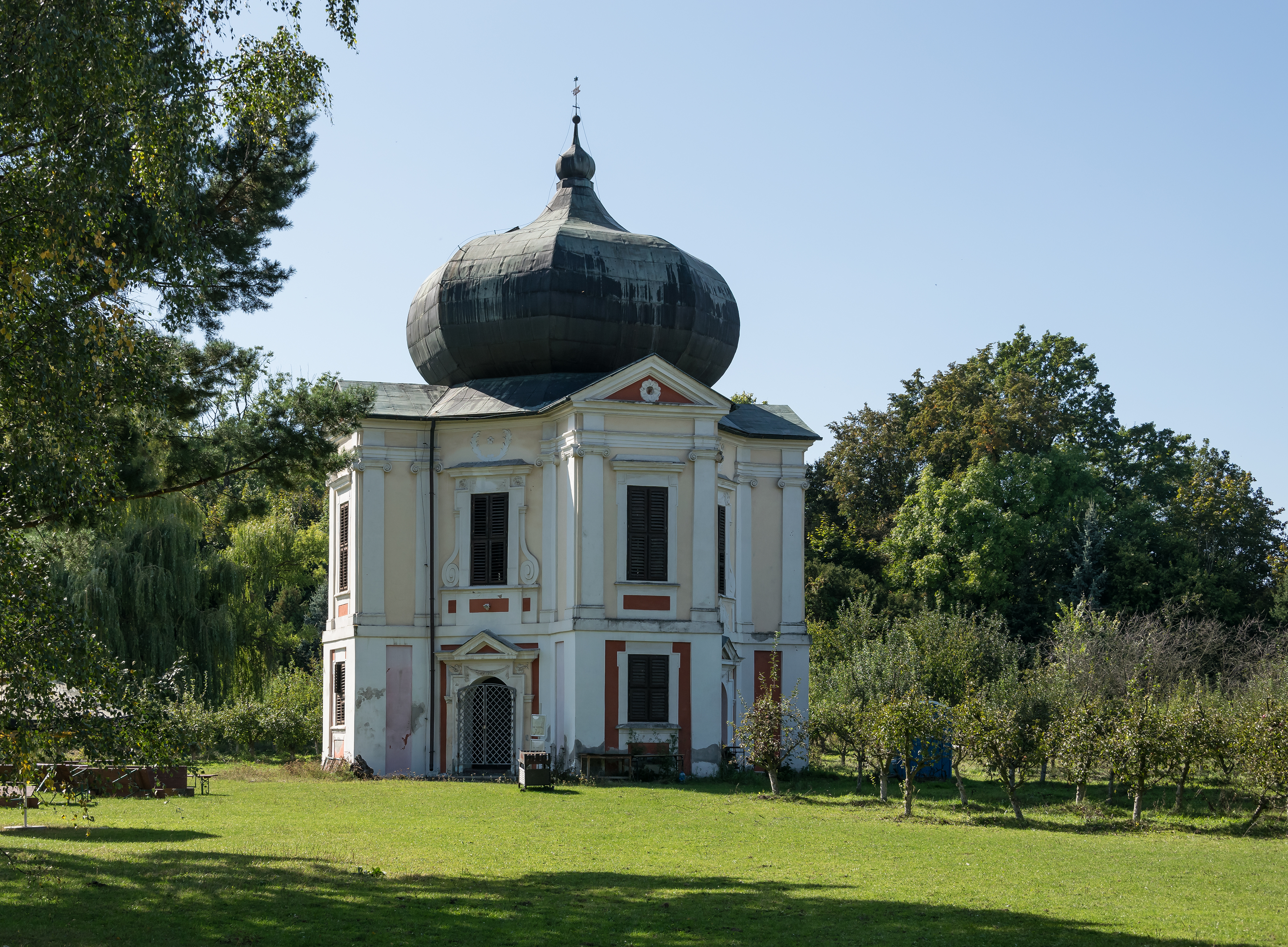
Garden pavilion

It was after the Thirty Years' War that the abbey experienced its greatest development and splendor. The beginnings of the post-war activity were difficult for the Cistercians due to significant debts of the monastery. For this reason abbot Kaspar Liebichen resigned from his function. However, his two successors, Melchior Welzel and Henry Kahlert, restored the monastery to its former glory, and their successor Tobiasz Ackermann continued the development of the abbey. Most of the abbey's Baroque buildings were constructed during this period. A programme of strengthening the faith of the inhabitants of the surrounding villages was carried out. The monastery church, which was rebuilt in Baroque style, became the focus of this programme. The most valuable relics located both in the church and in the abbey come from this period. In 1684 the main altar was founded, with the central part of the painting of the Nativity according to St. Bernard by Michael Willmann. Other paintings by Willmann and Jan Liszka were created at that time, as well as sculptures by Maciej Steinl, Tomasz Weissfeldt, Jerzy Leonard Weber and one of the finest Rococo monastic stalls in Poland, the work of unknown Cistercian woodcarvers, decorated with reliefs with scenes from the life of Jesus and the Virgin Mary. The church of the Henryków Abbey became an important Marian sanctuary and a place of worship of St. Joseph.

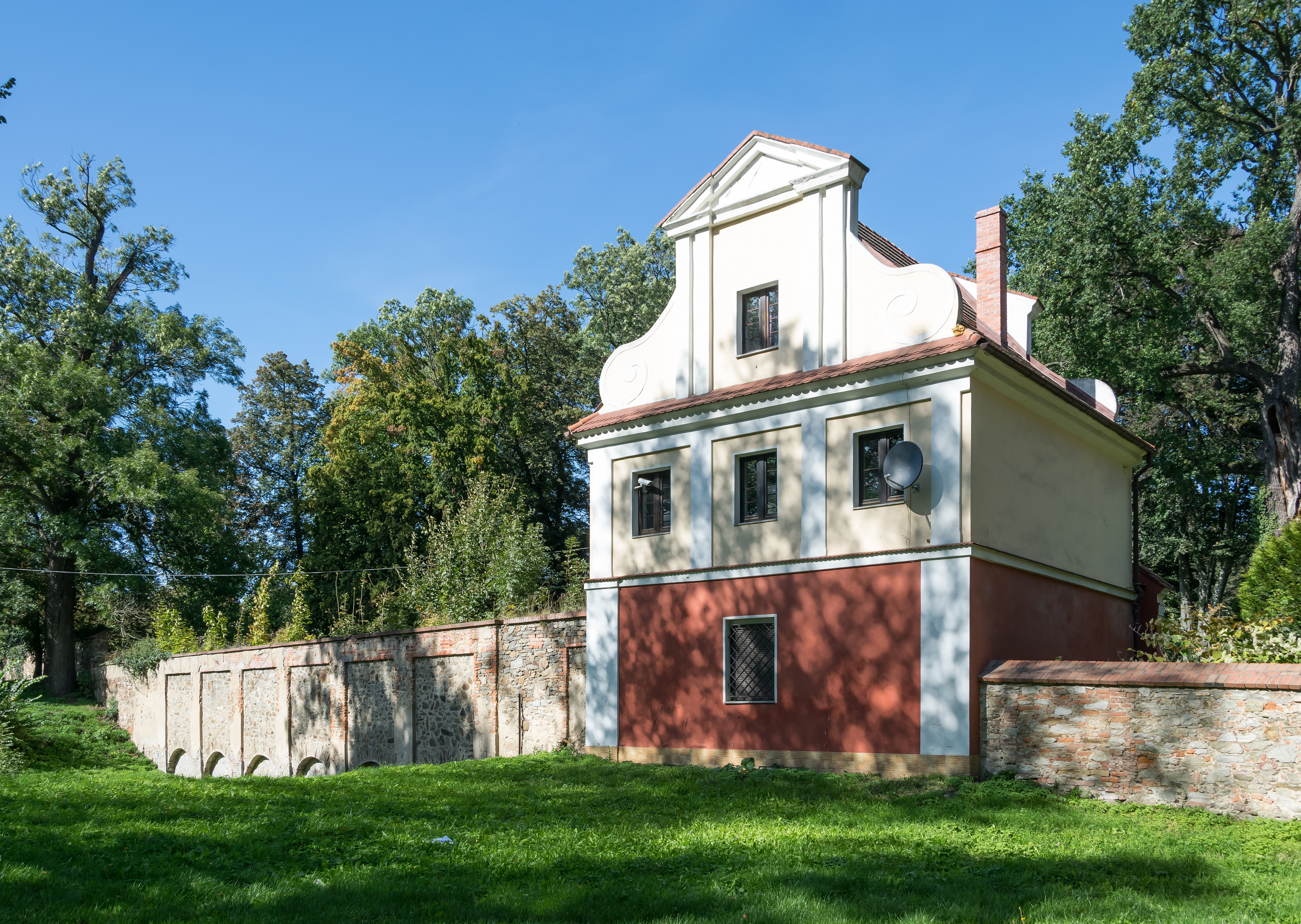
Park gate building

The economic strength of the abbey at that time was confirmed by the acquisition of the Cistercian abbey in Zirc in Hungary, destroyed by the Turks in 1699. From that time until the secularization of the monastery, the Abbot of Henryków was the abbot of two monasteries under a personal union. Around 1760, the chapel of St. Mary Magdalene was built, which became the mausoleum of the Ziębice Piasts.

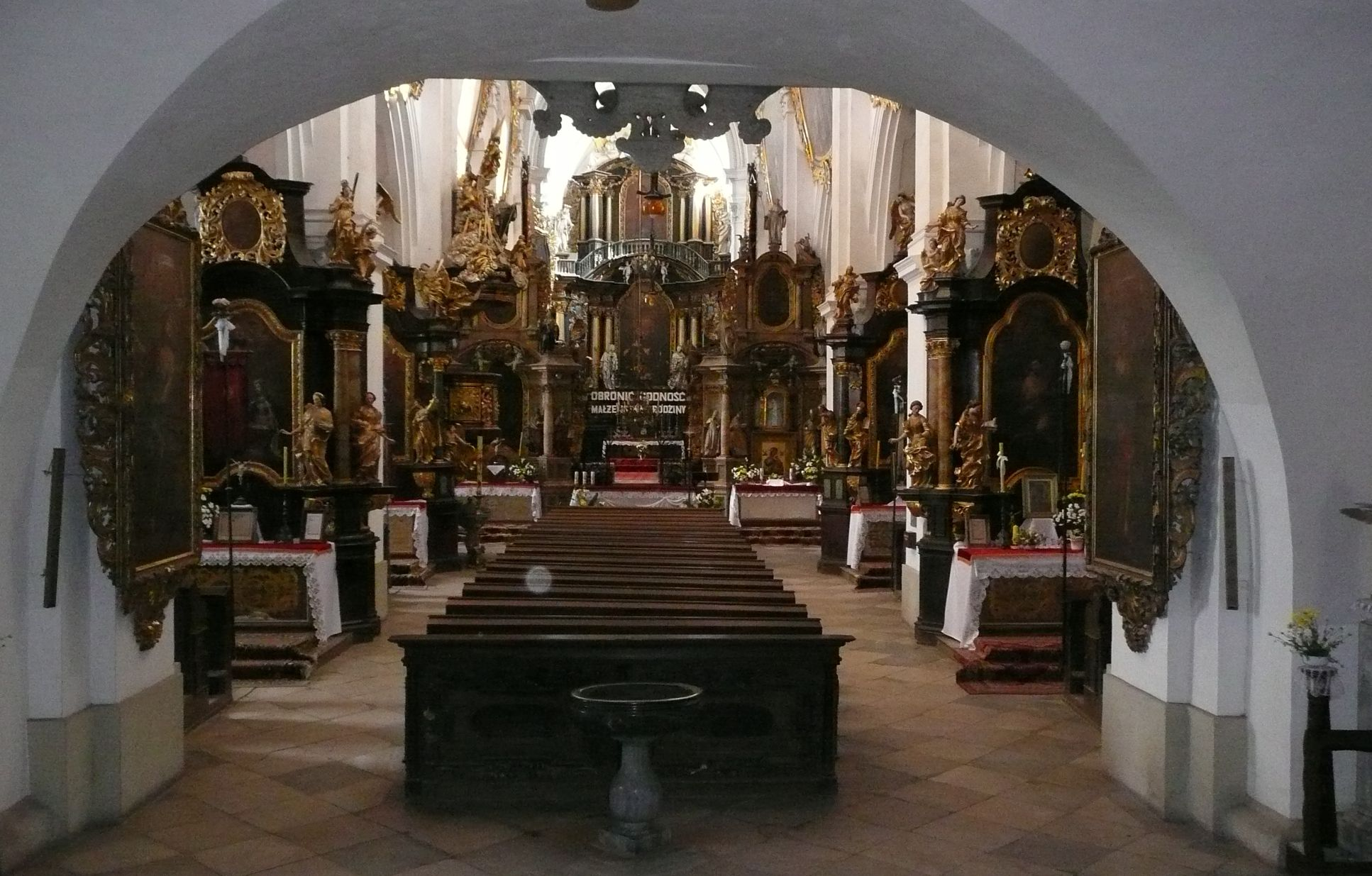
Interior of the church seen from the vestibule

The period of the Silesian Wars between Prussia and Austria in 1741–1762 impeded the development of the abbey. The army was stationed in the monastery several times, looting the monastic treasury. High war tributes were imposed on the abbey. Napoleonic wars brought the end of the monastery's functioning. In 1801 Prussian authorities closed the monastery secondary school and seized the monastery library with the richest in Silesia book collection, consisting of 132 manuscripts and 20 thousand books. On 22 November 1810 the Prussian King Frederick William III, looking for funds to reinforce the army, announced the secularization edict. The monks were forced to leave the monastery, taking only their habit, breviary and food for two days. The Henryków Abbey was liquidated after 582 years of functioning.

=== History of the abbey after the secularization ===
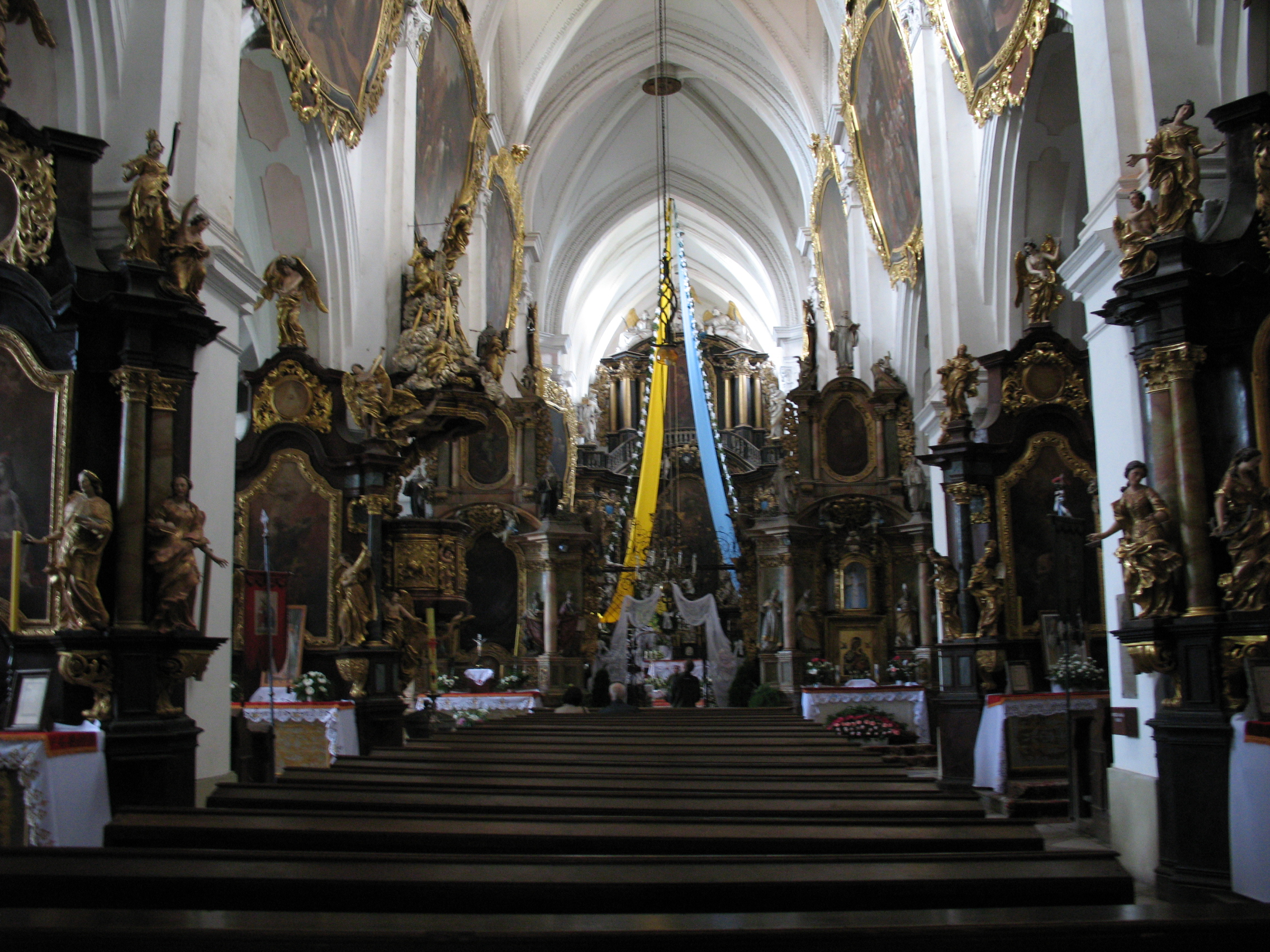
Interior of the church

Soon after the secularization, the Henryków estate was purchased by the Dutch queen Frederica Wilhelmina, sister of the Prussian king. The monastery was slightly rebuilt in order to be used as a magnate residence. In 1863 it was inherited by the Dukes of Saxe-Weimar. Although they were evangelicals, the Weimar family did not destroy the Cistercian relics in the monastery building itself. In 1879 a landscape park was created at the abbey as well as a garden in Italian style, clearly referring to the garden arrangements in Weimar. Later the abbey buildings housed an elite hospital for mentally ill. During the Third Reich, a military factory was organized in Henryków, where prisoners of war from Luxembourg worked. At the end of the war the monastery was robbed and devastated.

== The abbey today ==
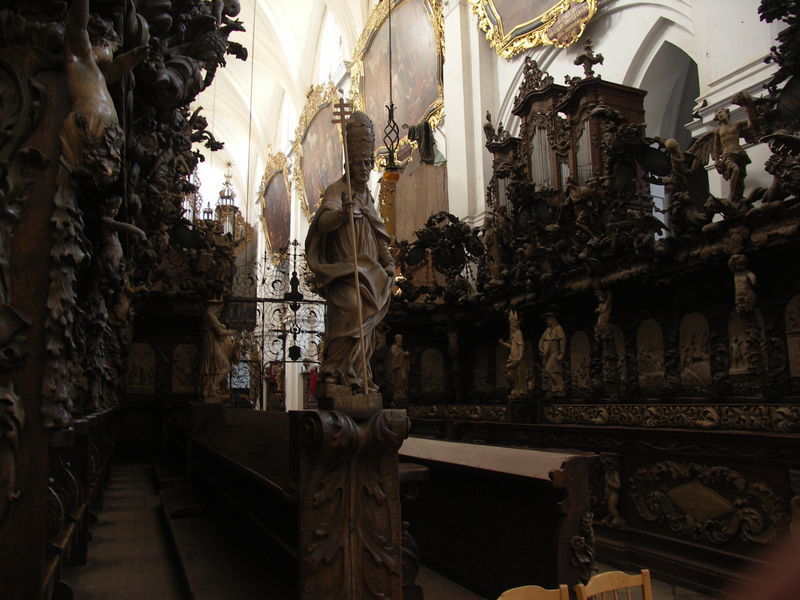
Church stalls

In 1949, the Henryków Abbey was returned into the hands of the Cistercians. The monks from Szczyrzyc established their priory here. They took over the church and part of the monastery, which is now a convent. The rest of the monastery was initially used as a military storehouse, then as a holiday resort of one of the Upper Silesian mines, and in 1965 a Plant Breeding and Seed Production Company and a Seed and Agricultural Technical School were established there. Since then, a slow reconstruction of the abbey began. In 1990, on the initiative of Cardinal Henryk Gulbinowicz, the abbey became the property of the Archdiocese of Wrocław. On 25 September 1990 Annus Propedeuticus was established in the premises of the abbey as a branch of the Metropolitan Theological Seminary in Wrocław for the clerics of the first year. In the following years the monastery buildings were renovated and the surrounding area was redeveloped. On 28 October 2000 Henryków was visited by Cardinal Joseph Ratzinger – later Pope Benedict XVI – for the solemn ceremony of placing the tunics on the students of the first year of the Metropolitan Theological Seminary in Wrocław.

In 1997, the St. Hedwig of Silesia Caritas Care Home was established as a votive offering for the 46th International Eucharistic Congress, which took place in Wrocław. In 2002, on the initiative of Cardinal Henryk Gulbinowicz, the Blessed Edmund Bojanowski Catholic High School (KLO) was founded in the monastery as a private school for boys with the rights of a public school and intended primarily for young people from poor rural families. After a complete renovation, the old, ruined infirmary of the monastery was turned into a dormitory for KLO. In 2004 archbishop Marian Gołębiewski, the new metropolitan of Wrocław, continued to take care of the monastery. In 2005 in part of the buildings a new Therapy Workshops were created, named after John Paul II and run by the diocesan Caritas.

== Monuments ==
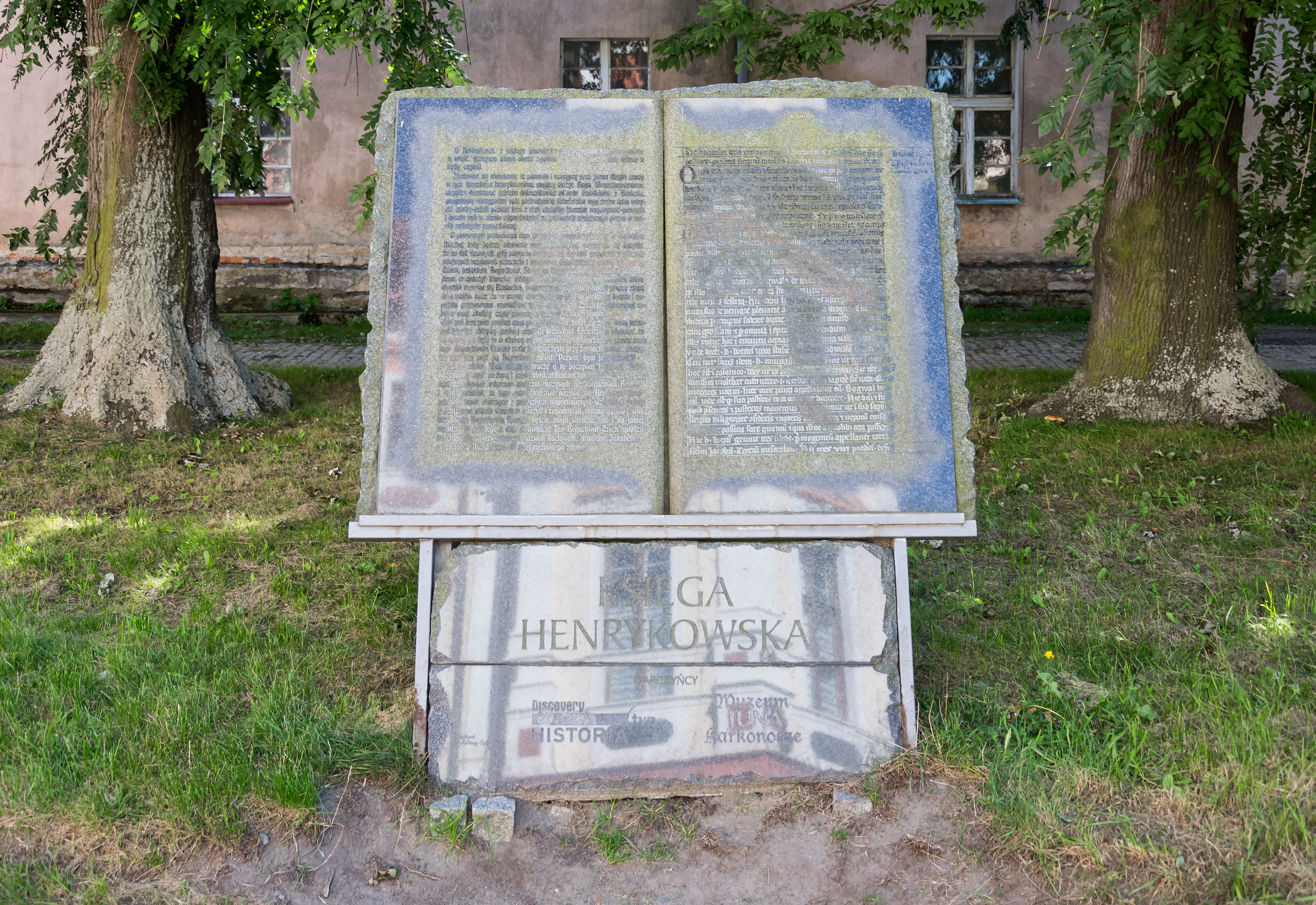
Monument to the Book of Henryków in the abbey courtyard

The Cistercian Abbey in Henryków is a unique complex of monuments entered in the register of monuments. According to this register, the historical complex includes several dozen buildings, the most important of which are:

- The parish church of Assumption of the Blessed Virgin Mary and John the Baptist, reg. no. A/1682/7272 of 25 November 1949
- Piast Mausoleum (the chapel of Mary Magdalene), reg. no. A/4151/335 of 6 November 1956
- Cistercian Monastery, now a monastery, seminary, middle school, residence, reg. no. A/ 1923/742/Wł from 30 April 1980
- Hospital building, now a junior high school dormitory, reg. no. A/4156/868/Wł from 21 September 1981
- Latin school, now a residential house, reg. no. A/4152/864/Wł from 21 September 1981
- Officials apartments, now housing the Caritas nursing home, reg. no. A/4153/865/Wł from 21 September 1981
- Stable with living quarters, reg. no. A/4154/866/Wł of 21 September 1981
- Coach house, reg. no. A/4155/867/Wł of 21 September 1981
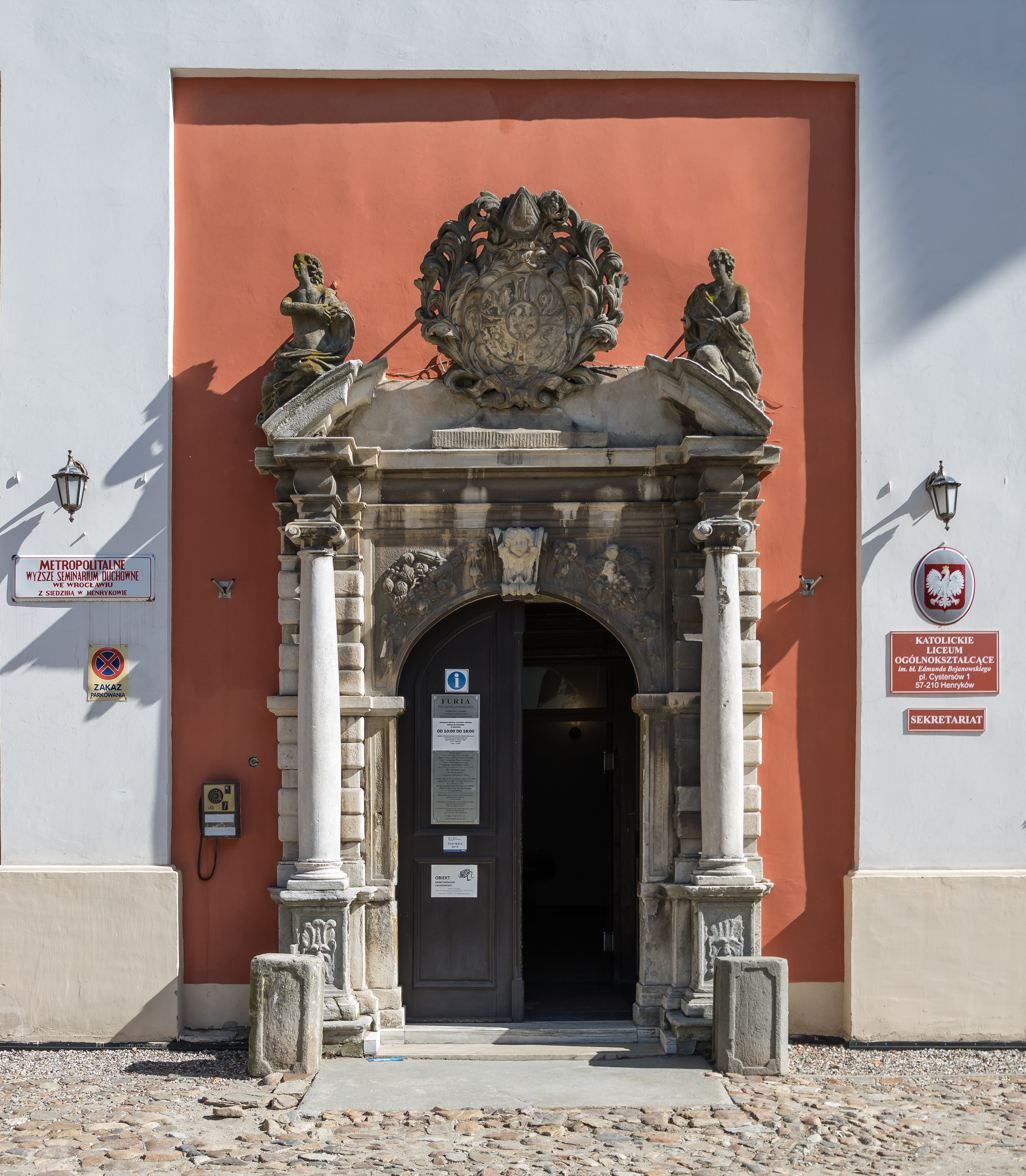
- Portal in the monastery building
  Building of the upper gate, the main entrance to the abbey, reg. no. A/4162/874/Wł of 21 September 1981
- The abbey park gate building, reg. no. A/4160/872/Wł of 21 September 1981
- Orangery I, now a gymnasium, reg. no. A/4158/870/Wł of 21 September 1981
- Orangery II
- Garden pavilion, reg. no. A/4157/869/Wł of 21 September 1981
- Gardener's house, reg. no. A/4165/1014/Wł of 21 September 1981
- Monastery gardens and park, reg. no. A/4166/293 of 1 February 1952
- St. Andrew's Auxiliary Church, reg. no. A/1931/1047/Wł from 30 November 1984

=== Church ===
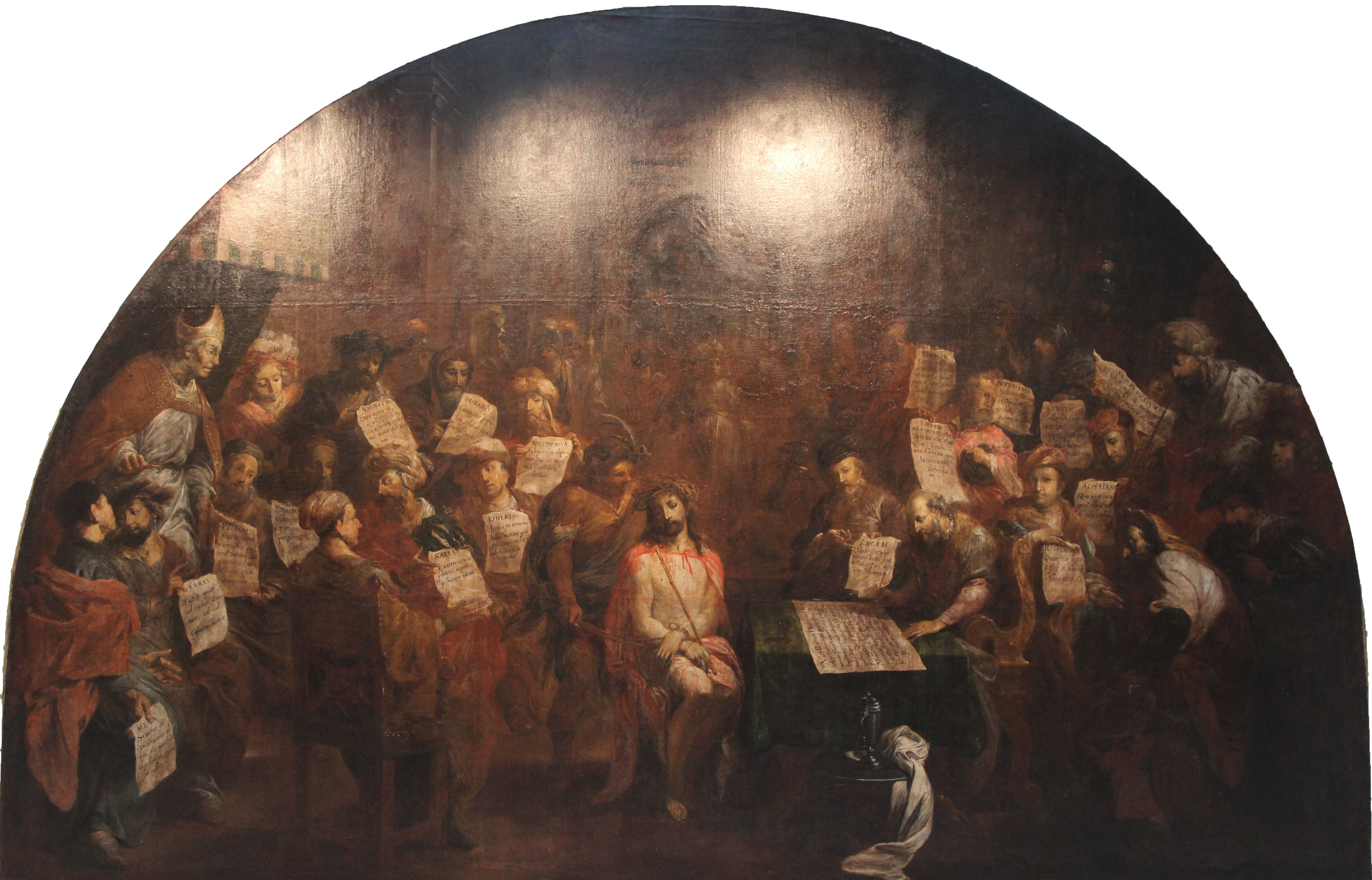
Michael Willman, The Trial of Christ (c. 1678)

The monastery church of the Assumption of the Blessed Virgin Mary and St. John the Baptist, now a basilica minor serving as a parish church, is the oldest and most valuable monument of the abbey. Its construction started in 1241 with a late Gothic presbytery and transept. In the middle of the 14th century the construction of the Gothic nave was completed. At the beginning of the 16th century two late Gothic chapels, the Holy Cross and the Holy Sepulchre, were added to the presbytery from the northeast. In 1608 a tower was erected on the west side. In the seventeenth century the church was rebuilt in the Baroque style, adding two more chapels, of St. Joseph and the Holy Trinity, and a façade with a chapel as a vestibule. In 1753 the chapel of St. Mary Magdalene, now the Piast mausoleum, was built. There is a Gothic tombstone of Duke Bolko and his wife Jutta in the mausoleum, one of the oldest double tombstones in Poland.

The main altar, the work of Georg Schroetter, was created between 1681 and 1684 and is decorated with two paintings by Michael Willmann, the large one depicting the Nativity as seen by St Bernard, and the upper one, the Saviour of the World. The large painting is surrounded on the left by statues of St. Benedict, St. John the Baptist and St. Peter, and on the right by statues of St. Bernard, St. John the Evangelist and St. Paul. There is a statue of Mother of God with Child in the side altar, called the Mother of the Polish Language. In 1952 she was crowned with bishop's crowns.

Baroque stalls are a feature of the church. They are a work of Silesian woodcarving. The oak, Renaissance stall shaft dates from 1567, the decoration is richly carved with acanthus and shells. The backrests, decorated with 36 reliefs depicting scenes from the life of Christ, were made of linden wood. After 1700, the abbot's and prior's boxes were added, and the entire structure was enriched with four pairs of free-standing statues of St. Gregory the Great, Eugene III, St. Jerome, Conrad de Poitiers, St. Benedict and St. Bernard.

The organ, the work of masters from Świdnica, comes from the mid 17th century and is the oldest in Silesia. The organ is complemented by 14 Baroque paintings depicting the life and legend of St. Bernard, located in the upper part of the nave.

=== Monastery complex ===
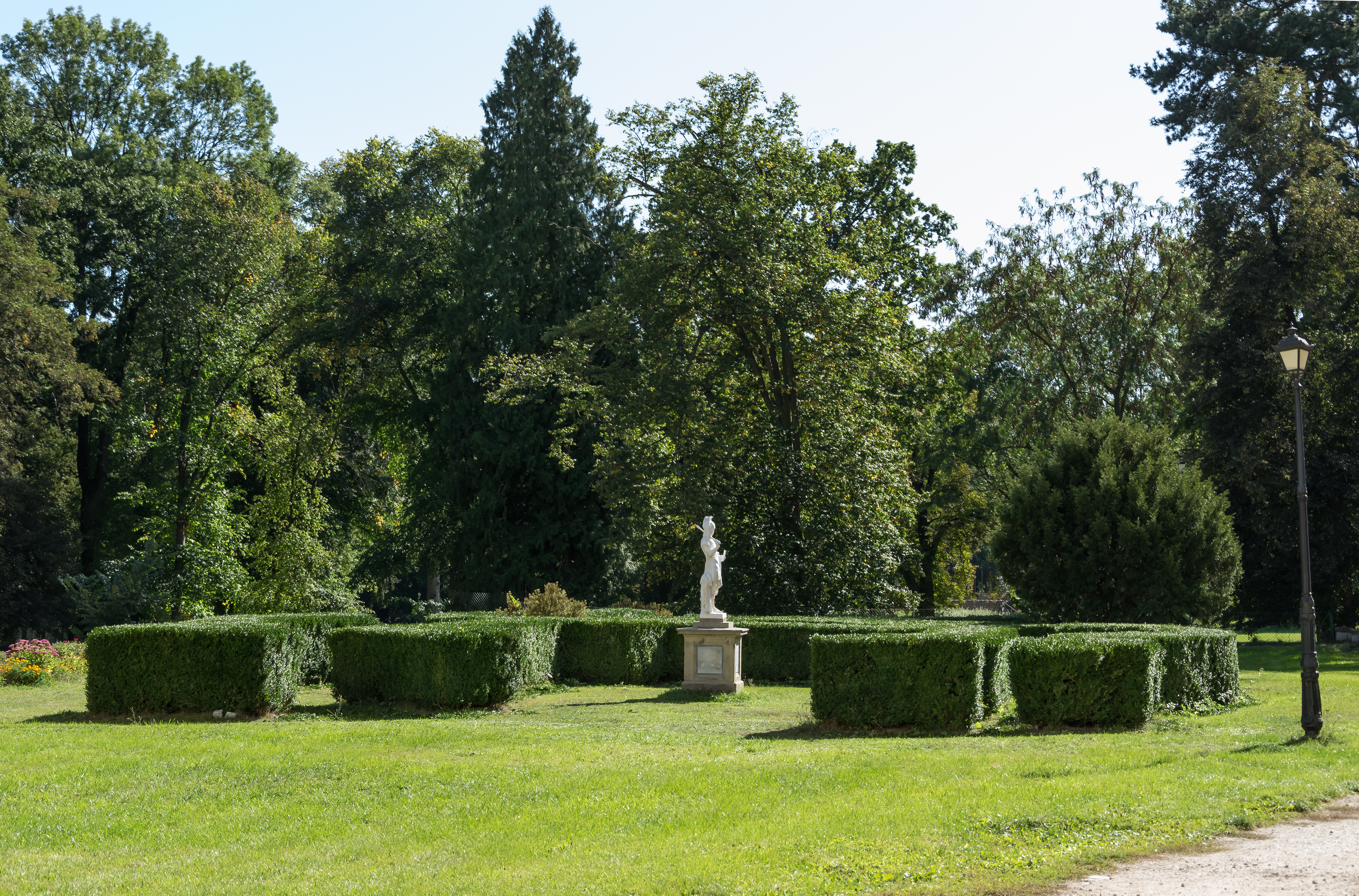
Monastery gardens

A baroque monastery building was constructed in 1681–1702, rebuilt in the second half of the 19th century into a quadrangle. Built around a rectangular courtyard with a protruding southern wing. Three Baroque portals lead to the interior, which has about 300 rooms: the court portal with the figure of Temida, the monastery portal with St. Benedict, and the abbey portal with the abbot's coat of arms. The ground floor contains a baroque refectory, the first floor holds representative rooms: Prince, Purple, Oak and Papal. The Oak Room has a richly inlaid parquet floor and wood panelling decorated with floral and fruit garlands (all made by Henryków woodcarvers). The Purple Room, intended as a place for the reception of distinguished guests, has purple walls and furniture upholstery and a marble fireplace. It contains six paintings by Willmann depicting the founders of the abbey. The refectory has a decorative, multicolored rococo stove (each tile painted by hand) and oak benches from the eighteenth century. The seminary chapel is decorated with Renaissance panelling.

The monastery courtyard is surrounded by residential buildings and farm buildings. Surrounding the monastery is a baroque park with an abbots' garden preserved in its original form. There is a building in its center – the former summer dining room of the abbots. A monument was erected next to the monastery, commemorating the writing of the Book of Henryków, which is as famous a historical object as the abbey itself.

The third oldest yew tree in Poland grows in the monastery park.

== Bibliography ==
- Adam Dylewski: Piękna Polska. Śląsk. Warszawa: Świat Książki, 2008. ISBN 978-83-247-0498-9
- Maria i Przemysław Pilich: Polska. Przewodnik ilustrowany. Warszawa: Sport i Turystyka. Muza SA, 2007. ISBN 978-83-7495-094-7
