= Book of Henryków =

13th-century chronicle from Poland

- Księga henrykowska
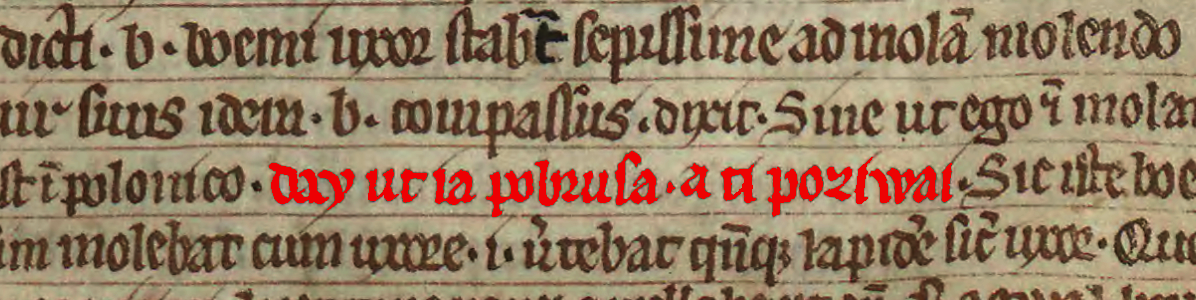
- The oldest known Old Polish sentence, highlighted in red
- Language: medieval Latin, Old Polish
- Date: 1268–1310
- Provenance: Cistercian Monastery in Henryków
- Genre: Chronicle
- Period covered: 1227–1310

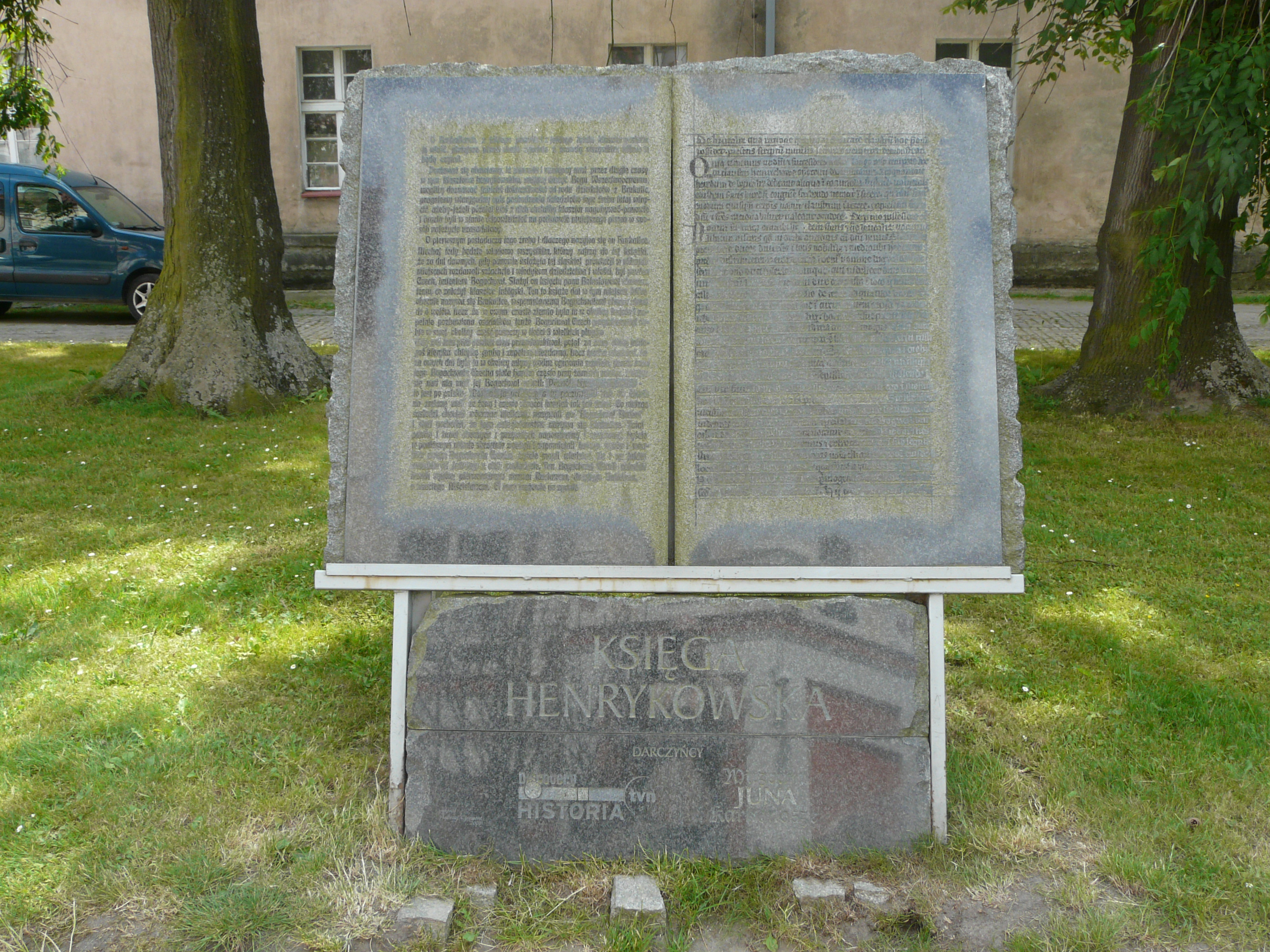
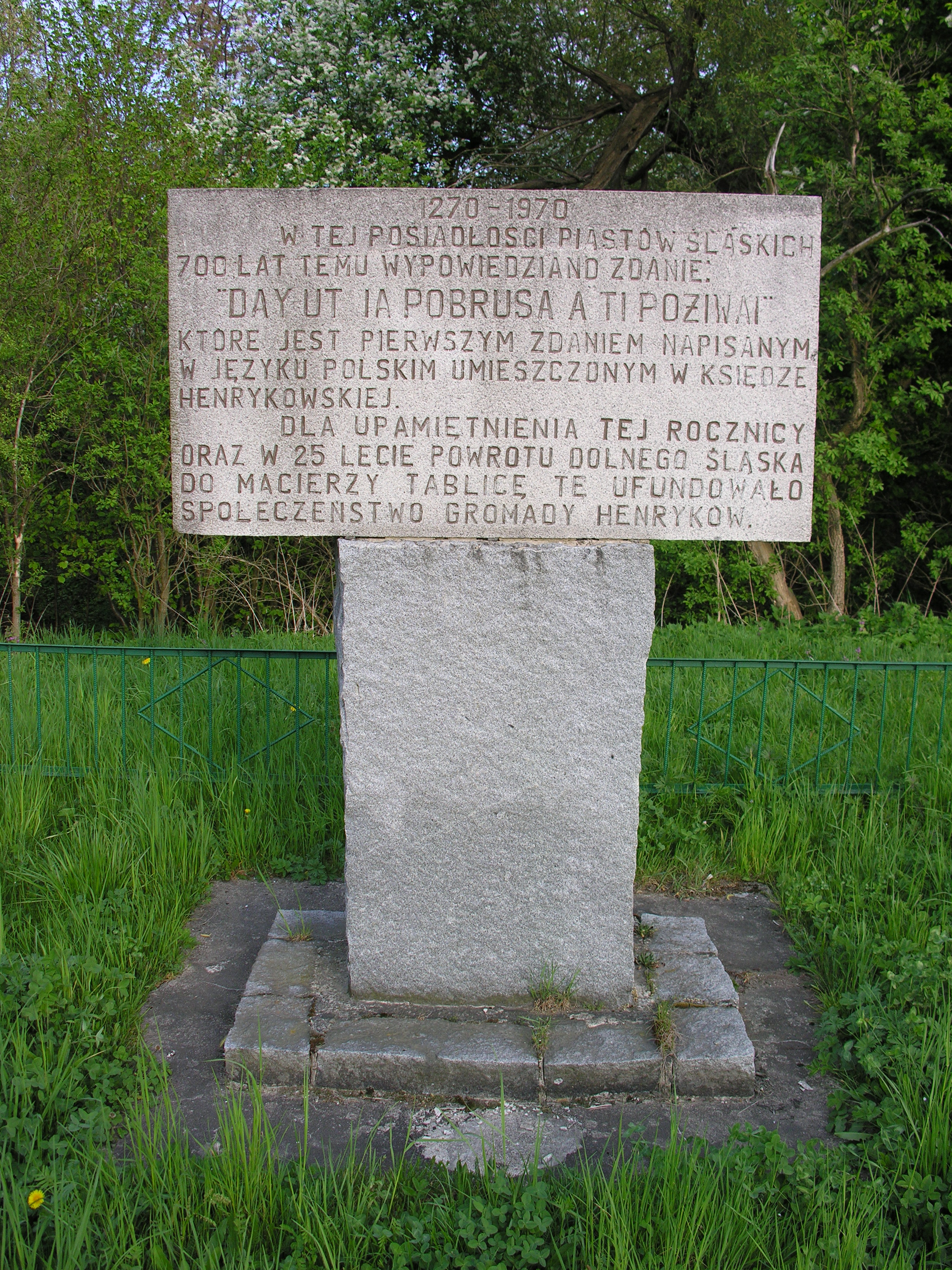
Book of Henryków memorials in Henryków and Brukalice

The Book of Henryków (Polish: Księga henrykowska, Latin: Liber fundationis claustri Sanctae Mariae Virginis in Heinrichow) is a Latin chronicle of the Cistercian abbey in Henryków in Lower Silesia, Poland. Originally created as a registry of belongings looted during the first Mongol invasion of Poland of 1241, with time it was extended to include the history of the monastery. It is notable as the oldest known document to include an entire sentence written in early Polish language. What can be interpreted as Old Polish language is described in the text itself as polonico and converted to latin. Currently the book is on exhibition in the Archdiocesan Museum in Wrocław. On October 9, 2015 the Book of Henryków was listed in UNESCO's "Memory of the World Programme".

The first part of the 100-page-long book is devoted to the early history of the abbey, from its foundation by Henry the Bearded in 1227 until 1259. The second part includes the later history until 1310. In the record for 1270, a settler from the nearby village is reported to have said to his wife "Day, ut ia pobrusa, a ti poziwai", which could be roughly translated as "Let me, I shall grind, and you take a rest".

The circumstances under which this sentence was written closely reflected the cultural and literary conditions in Poland in the first centuries of its national existence. It appeared in a Latin chronicle, written by a German abbot. The man who reportedly uttered the sentence almost one hundred years earlier was Bogwal, a Czech (Bogwalus Boemus), a local settler, and subject of Bolesław the Tall, as he felt compassion for his wife, who "very often stood grinding by the quern-stone". The local village, Brukalice, came to be named after him.

== The Old Polish sentence ==
The medieval recorder of this phrase, the Cistercian monk Peter of the Henryków monastery, noted "Hoc est in polonico" ("This is in Polish") before quoting it.

"Unde dicti B[ogwali] Boemi uxor stab[a]t sepissime ad mola[m] molendo. Cui vir suus idem B[ogwalus], compassus dixit: Sine, ut ego etiam molam. Hoc est i[n] polonico: Day, ut ia pobrusa, a ti poziwai." - Book of Henryków (Liber fundationis claustri Sanctae Mariae Virginis in Henrichow), 1270

== See also ==
- Hortulus Animae

== Bibliography ==
- Elżbieta Olinkiewicz; Katarzyna Radzymińska; Halina Styś (1999). Słownik Encyklopedyczny - Język polski (in Polish). Europa. ISBN 83-87977-20-9. Archived from the original on 2006-06-27.
- (in English and Polish) Michał Jacek Mikoś (1999). "Middle Ages: Literary background". Polish Literature from the Middle Ages to the End of the Eighteenth Century. A Bilingual Anthology. Warsaw: Constans. p. 683. ISBN 83-901014-3-2.
