= Ząbkowice County =

Coordinates: 50°35′N 16°49′E

Ząbkowice County Powiat ząbkowicki
- County
- Flag Coat of arms

- Location within the voivodeship

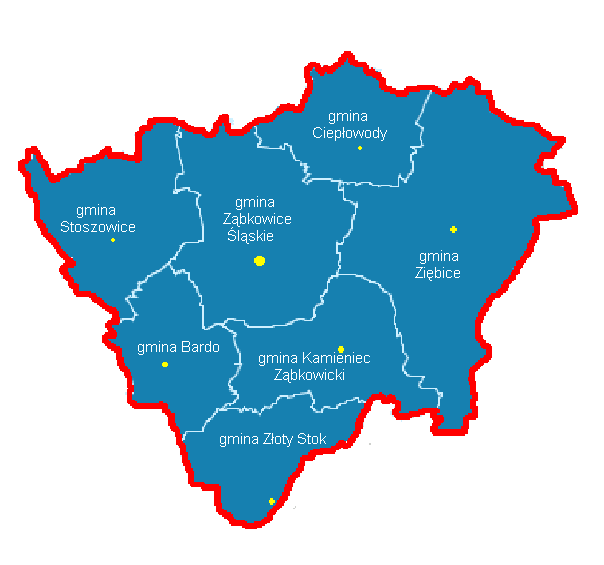
- Division into gminas
- Country: Poland
- Voivodeship: Lower Silesian
- Seat: Ząbkowice Śląskie
- Gminas: Total 7: Gmina Bardo; Gmina Ciepłowody; Gmina Kamieniec Ząbkowicki; Gmina Stoszowice; Gmina Ząbkowice Śląskie; Gmina Ziębice; Gmina Złoty Stok

Area
  - Total: 801.75 km^{2} (309.56 sq mi)

Population (2019-06-30)
  - Total: 65,104
  - Density: 81.202/km^{2} (210.31/sq mi)
  - Urban: 29,032
  - Rural: 36,072
- Car plates: DZA
- Website: www.ziemiazabkowicka.eu

Ząbkowice County (Polish: powiat ząbkowicki) is a unit of territorial administration and local government (powiat) in Lower Silesian Voivodeship, south-western Poland. It came into being on January 1, 1999, as a result of the Polish local government reforms passed in 1998. The county covers an area of 801.75 square kilometres (309.6 sq mi). Its administrative seat is Ząbkowice Śląskie, and it also contains the towns of Ziębice, Złoty Stok and Bardo.

As of 2019 the total population of the county is 65,104. The most populated towns are Ząbkowice Śląskie with 15,004 inhabitants and Ziębice with 8,708 inhabitants.

== Neighbouring counties ==
Ząbkowice County is bordered by Kłodzko County to the south-west, Dzierżoniów County to the north-west, Strzelin County to the north-east and Nysa County to the east. It also borders the Czech Republic to the south.

== Administrative divisions ==
The county is subdivided into seven gminas (four urban-rural and three rural). These are listed in the following table, in descending order of population.

Gmina	Type	Area (km^{2})	Population (2019)	Seat
Gmina Ząbkowice Śląskie	urban-rural	146.9	21,775	Ząbkowice Śląskie
Gmina Ziębice	urban-rural	222.2	17,001	Ziębice
Gmina Kamieniec Ząbkowicki	rural	96.2	8,137	Kamieniec Ząbkowicki
Gmina Stoszowice	rural	109.8	5,383	Stoszowice
Gmina Bardo	urban-rural	73.4	5,316	Bardo
Gmina Złoty Stok	urban-rural	75.6	4,476	Złoty Stok
Gmina Ciepłowody	rural	77.5	3,016	Ciepłowody
