= Nioboholtite =

General
- Category: Silicate mineral
- Formula: (Nb_{0.6}[]_{0.4})Al_{6}BSi_{3}O_{18}
- IMA symbol: Nhlt
- Crystal system: Orthorhombic
- Crystal class: Dipyramidal (mmm); H-M symbol: (2/m 2/m 2/m)
- Space group: Pnma
- Unit cell: a = 47.00, b = 11.83 c = 20.24 [Å] (approximated)

Identification
- Color: Creamy-white to brownish yellow, grey-yellow
- Streak: White
- Diaphaneity: Translucent
- Optical properties: Biaxal (-)
- Refractive index: nα=1.74-1.75, nβ~1.76, nγ~1.76 (approximated)

Nioboholtite is an extremely rare mineral with the formula (Nb_{0.6}[]_{0.4})Al_{6}BSi_{3}O_{18}. It is the niobium-rich member of the dumortierite supergroup, and the niobium analogue of holtite of the holtite group. It is one of three quite recently found minerals of this group, the other two being titanoholtite and szklaryite, all coming from the Szklary village near Ząbkowice Śląskie in Poland. They occur in a unique pegmatite. Nioboholtite and schiavinatoite are both minerals with essential niobium and boron.

== Association ==
Nioboholtite is mainly associated with holtite and a number of other minerals (see szklaryite).

== Notes on chemistry ==
Main impurities in nioboholtite are antimony and arsenic, with trace or minor aluminium iron, tantalum, titanium, phosphorus and hydroxyl groups.
