= Titanoholtite =

Rare silicate mineral

General
- Category: Silicate mineral
- Formula: (Ti_{0.75}[]_{0.25})Al_{6}BSi_{3}O_{18}
- IMA symbol: Thlt
- Crystal system: Orthorhombic
- Crystal class: Dipyramidal (mmm); H-M symbol: (2/m 2/m 2/m)
- Space group: Pbcm
- Unit cell: a = 47.00 Å, b = 11.83 Å c = 20.24 Å

Identification

Titanoholtite is an extremely rare mineral with the formula (Ti_{0.75}[]_{0.25})Al_{6}BSi_{3}O_{18}. It is titanium-rich member of dumortierite supergroup, and titanium-analogue of holtite of the holtite group. It is one of three quite recently found minerals of this group, the other two being nioboholtite and szklaryite, all coming from the Szklary village near Ząbkowice Śląskie in Poland. They occur in a unique pegmatite of probable anatectic origin.

== Association ==
Titanoholtite is closely associated with holtite and nioboholtite; its further association is very rich (see szklaryite).

== Notes on chemistry ==
Impurities in titanoholtite are mainly antimony and arsenic, with trace niobium, tantalum, titanium, and iron.
