= Szklaryite =

General
- Category: Arsenate
- Formula: []Al_{6}BAs_{3}^{3+}O_{15}
- IMA symbol: Sky
- Crystal system: Orthorhombic
- Crystal class: Dipyramidal (mmm); H-M symbol: (2/m 2/m 2/m)
- Space group: Pbcm
- Unit cell: a = 47.00 Å, b = 11.83 Å c = 20.24 Å (approximated)

Identification
- Crystal habit: tiny patch

Szklaryite is an extremely rare mineral with the formula []Al_{6}BAs_{3}^{3+}O_{15}. It is essentially vacant ("[]"), arsenic-dominant member of dumortierite supergroup, giving a name of szklaryite group. It is one of three quite recently found minerals of this group, the other two being nioboholtite and titanoholtite, all coming from the Szklary village near Ząbkowice Śląskie in Poland. They occur in a unique pegmatite of probable anatectic origin.

== Occurrence and association ==
Szklaryite was detected as a tiny patch ca. 2 μm in size, in arsenic- and antimony-bearing dumortierite. Such a small size precluded determination of many of its properties. Szklaryite is associated with a wide variety of minerals including: nioboholtite, titanoholtite, fersmite, holtite, alluaudite, native antimony, manganese-bearing minerals of the apatite group (F-, OH- and Cl-rich apatite), native arsenic, beusite, native bismuth, cheralite, chrysoberyl, columbite-(Fe), columbite-(Mn), ernienickelite, native gold, gorceixite, hollandite, microcline, mitridatite, monazite-(Ce), muscovite, natrophilite, nontronite, various representatives of the betafite, microlite and pyrochlore groups; paradocrasite, phosphohedyphane, plumbogummite, pollucite, purpurite, quartz, ranciéite, romanèchite, saponite, spessartine, stibarsen, stibiocolumbite, stibiotantalite, tantalite-(Mn), thorutite, uraninite, xenotime-(Y), and zircon.

== Notes on chemistry ==
An important admixture in szklaryite is antimony, while titanium, iron, and aluminium occur in trace amounts.
