= Olbrachcice Wielkie =

- Village
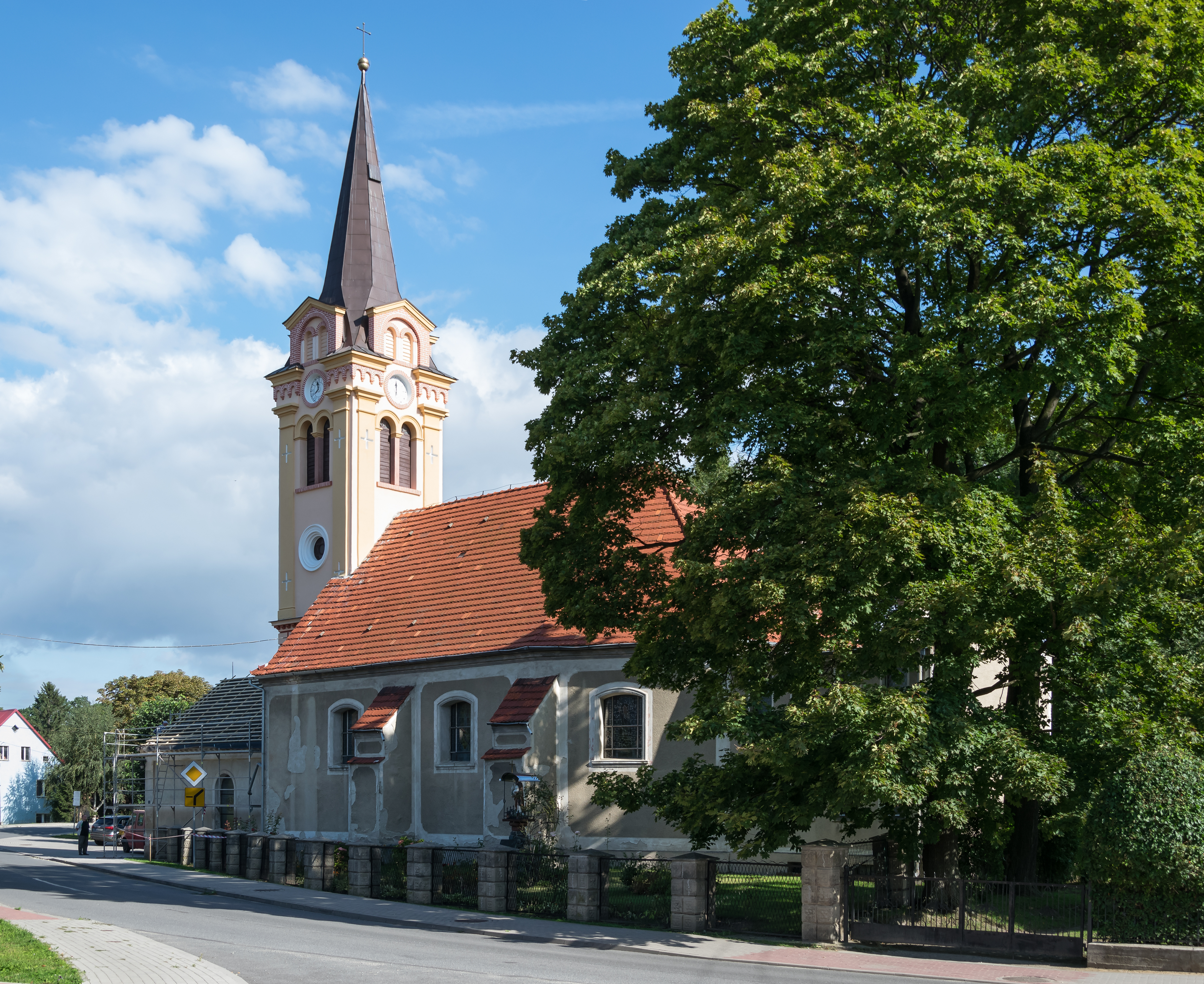
- Catholic church

- Location within Poland
- Coordinates: 50°36′N 16°46′E
- Country: Poland
- Voivodeship: Lower Silesian
- County: Ząbkowice
- Gmina: Ząbkowice Śląskie

Olbrachcice Wielkie [ɔlbraxˈt͡ɕit͡sɛ ˈvjɛlkʲɛ] is a village in the administrative district of Gmina Ząbkowice Śląskie, within Ząbkowice County, Lower Silesian Voivodeship, in south-western Poland.

== History ==
In 1742, the Silesian region was annexed from Austria by Prussian King Frederick the Great. The area nearby also experienced a period of French occupation during the Napoleonic Wars (1805 - 1815) after the Kingdom of Prussia's defeat during the War of the Fourth Coalition (1806 - 1807). After the 1871, the region was part of the German Empire.

Prior to 1945, the village was known in German as Groß Olbersdorf and was a part of the Silesian territory Kreis Frankenstein (the former German name for the city of Ząbkowice Śląskie).
