= Bobolice (disambiguation) =

Bobolice is a town in West Pomeranian Voivodeship, north-west Poland.

Bobolice may also refer to the following villages:

- Bobolice, Lower Silesian Voivodeship (south-west Poland)
- Bobolice, Silesian Voivodeship (south Poland)
