= Szklary-Huta =

- Village
- Location within Poland
- Coordinates: 50°39′05″N 16°49′37″E
- Country: Poland
- Voivodeship: Lower Silesian
- County: Ząbkowice
- Gmina: Ząbkowice Śląskie

Szklary-Huta [ˈʂklarɨ ˈxuta] is a village in the administrative district of Gmina Ząbkowice Śląskie, within Ząbkowice County, Lower Silesian Voivodeship, in south-western Poland.
