= Sulisławice, Ząbkowice County =

Sulisławice
- Village
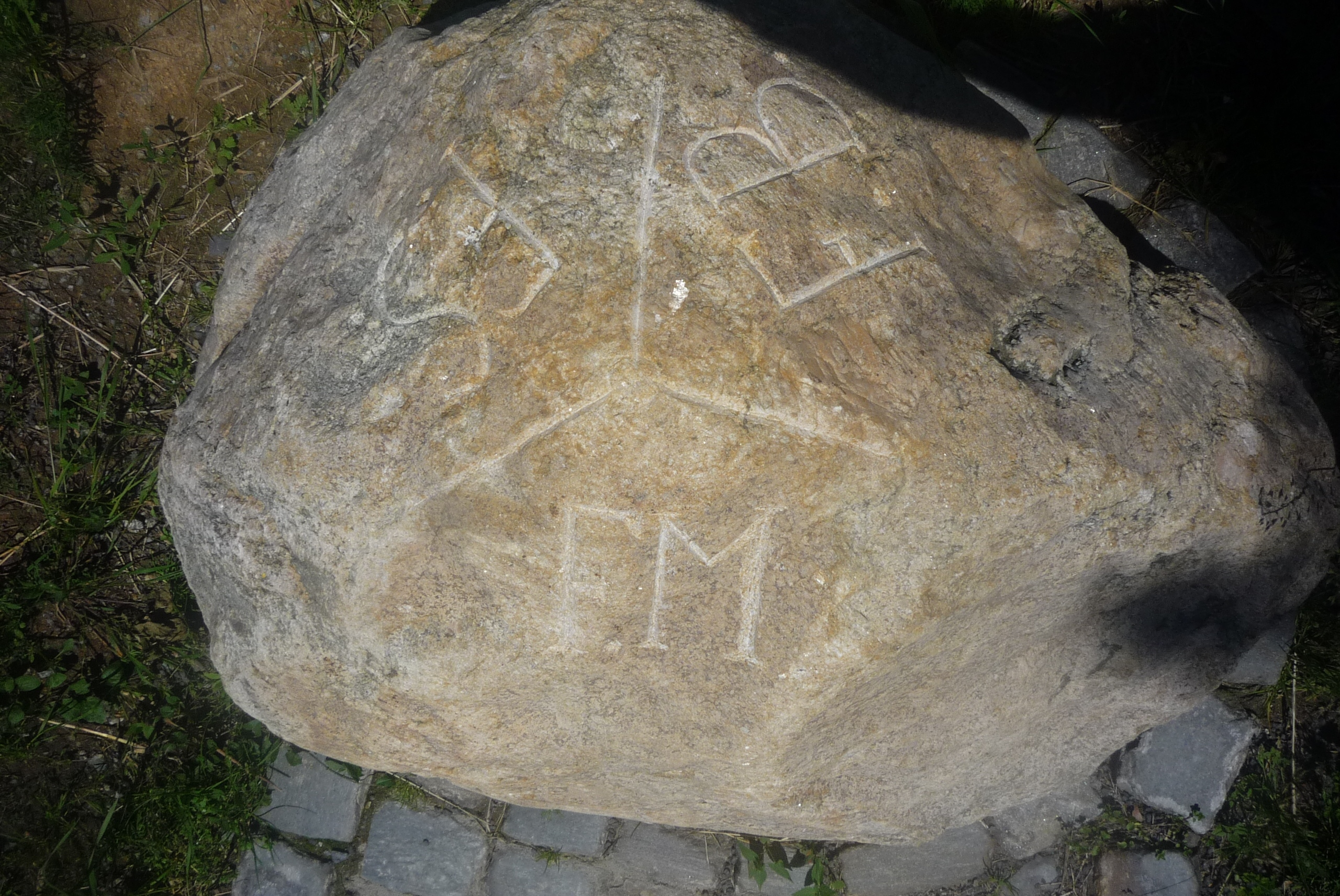

- Location within Poland
- Coordinates: 50°39′17″N 16°48′46″E
- Country: Poland
- Voivodeship: Lower Silesian
- County: Ząbkowice
- Gmina: Ząbkowice Śląskie
- Population: 310

Sulisławice [suliswaˈvit͡sɛ] is a village in the administrative district of Gmina Ząbkowice Śląskie, within Ząbkowice County, Lower Silesian Voivodeship, in south-western Poland.
