= Pawłowice, Lower Silesian Voivodeship =

Pawłowice
- Village
- Location within Poland
- Coordinates: 50°32′46″N 16°49′35″E
- Country: Poland
- Voivodeship: Lower Silesian
- County: Ząbkowice
- Gmina: Ząbkowice Śląskie

Pawłowice [pavwɔˈvit͡sɛ] is a village in the administrative district of Gmina Ząbkowice Śląskie, within Ząbkowice County, Lower Silesian Voivodeship, in south-western Poland.
