= Strąkowa =

- Village
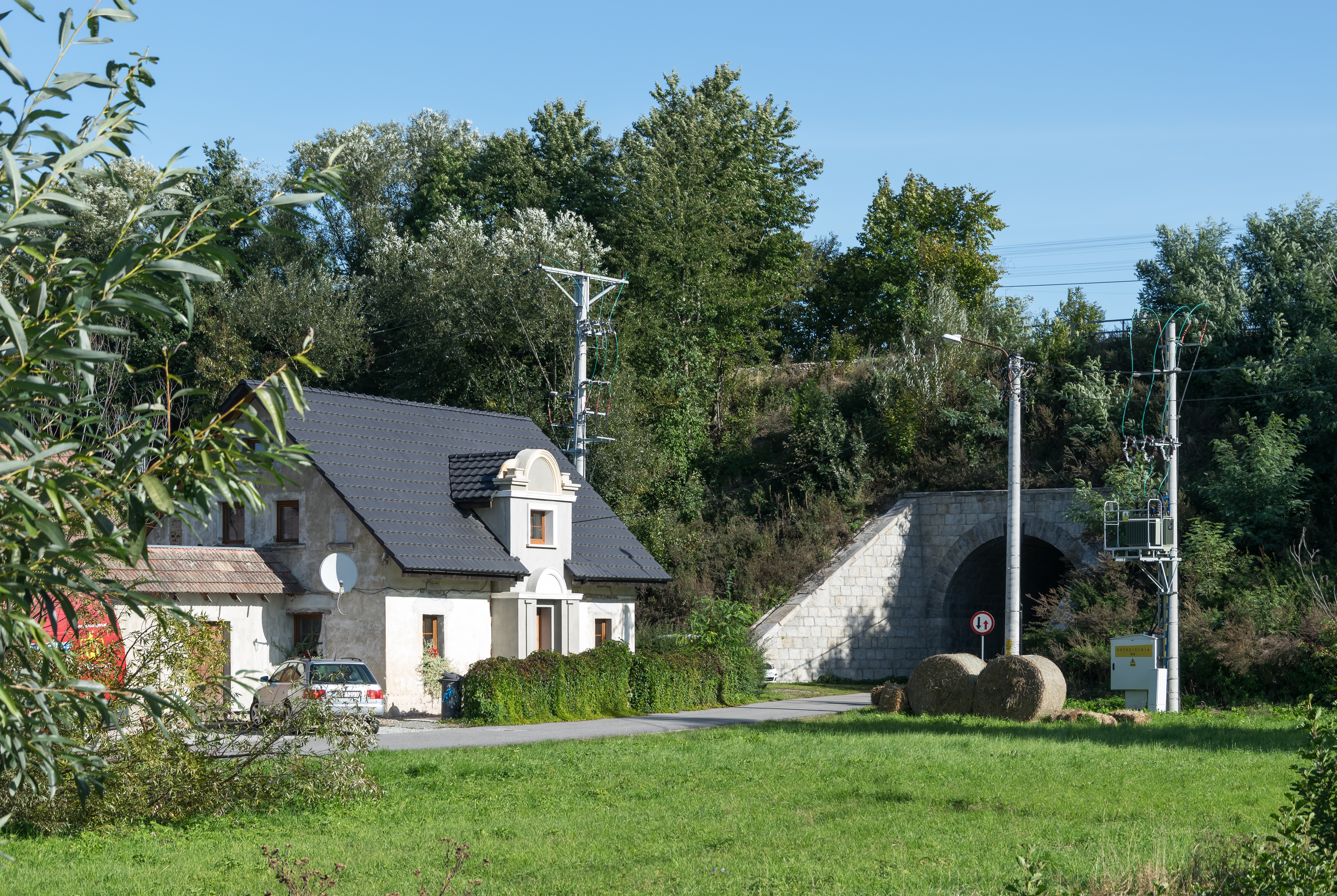

- Location within Poland
- Coordinates: 50°34′N 16°51′E
- Country: Poland
- Voivodeship: Lower Silesian
- County: Ząbkowice
- Gmina: Ząbkowice Śląskie

Strąkowa [strɔŋˈkɔva] is a village in the administrative district of Gmina Ząbkowice Śląskie, within Ząbkowice County, Lower Silesian Voivodeship, in south-western Poland.
