= Gmina Ząbkowice Śląskie =

Gmina Ząbkowice Śląskie Ząbkowice Śląskie Commune
- Gmina
- Coat of arms
- Interactive map of Gmina Ząbkowice Śląskie
- Coordinates (Ząbkowice Śląskie): 50°35′N 16°49′E
- Country: Poland
- Voivodeship: Lower Silesian
- County: Ząbkowice
- Seat: Ząbkowice Śląskie
- Sołectwos: Bobolice, Braszowice, Brodziszów, Grochowiska, Jaworek, Kluczowa, Koziniec, Olbrachcice Wielkie, Pawłowice, Rakowice, Sadlno, Sieroszów, Siodłowice, Stolec, Strąkowa, Sulisławice, Szklary, Szklary-Huta, Tarnów, Zwrócona

Area
  - Total: 146.88 km^{2} (56.71 sq mi)

Population (2019-06-30)
  - Total: 21,775
  - Density: 148.25/km^{2} (383.97/sq mi)
  - Urban: 15,004
  - Rural: 6,771
- Website: http://www.zabkowiceslaskie.pl

Gmina Ząbkowice Śląskie is an urban-rural gmina (administrative district) in Ząbkowice County, Lower Silesian Voivodeship, in south-western Poland. Its seat is the town of Ząbkowice Śląskie, which lies approximately 63 kilometres (39 mi) south of the regional capital Wrocław.

The gmina covers an area of 146.88 square kilometres (56.7 sq mi), and as of 2019 its total population is 21,775.

== Neighbouring gminas ==
Gmina Ząbkowice Śląskie is bordered by the town of Piława Górna and the gminas of Bardo, Ciepłowody, Kamieniec Ząbkowicki, Niemcza, Stoszowice and Ziębice.

== Villages ==
Apart from the town of Ząbkowice Śląskie, the gmina contains the villages of Bobolice, Braszowice, Brodziszów, Grochowiska, Jaworek, Kluczowa, Koziniec, Olbrachcice Wielkie, Pawłowice, Rakowice, Sadlno, Sieroszów, Siodłowice, Stolec, Strąkowa, Sulisławice, Szklary, Szklary-Huta, Tarnów and Zwrócona.

== Twin towns – sister cities ==
Gmina Ząbkowice Śląskie is twinned with:

- Bran, Romania
- Červený Kostelec, Czech Republic
- Fontenay-aux-Roses, France
- Sławno, Poland
- Uchte, Germany
- Wiesloch, Germany
