= Braszowice =

- Village
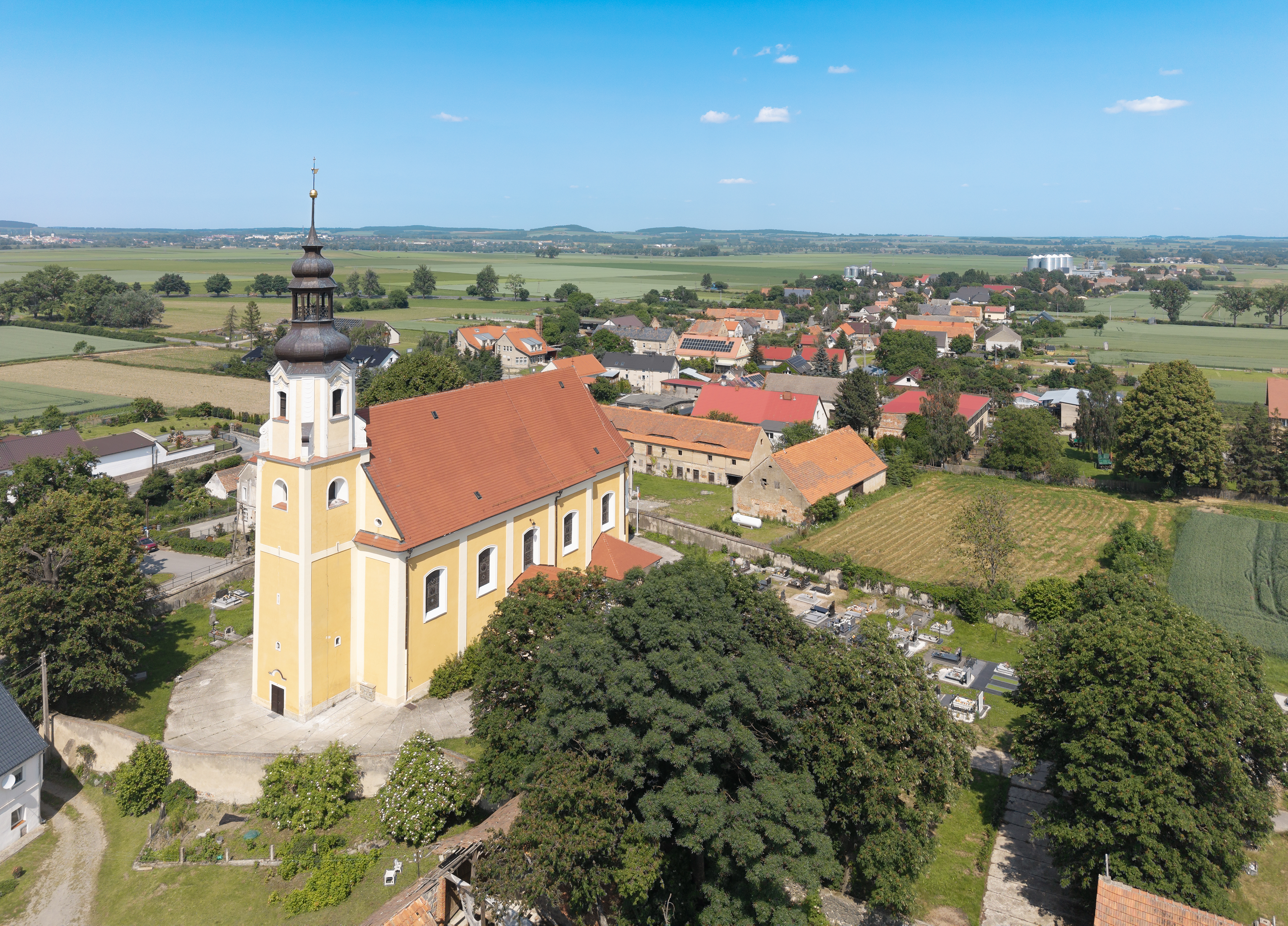
- Church of Saint Lawrence

- Location within Poland
- Coordinates: 50°33′N 16°47′E
- Country: Poland
- Voivodeship: Lower Silesian
- County: Ząbkowice
- Gmina: Ząbkowice Śląskie

Braszowice [braʂɔˈvit͡sɛ] is a village in the administrative district of Gmina Ząbkowice Śląskie, within Ząbkowice County, Lower Silesian Voivodeship, in south-western Poland.
