= Grochowiska, Lower Silesian Voivodeship =

Grochowiska
- Village
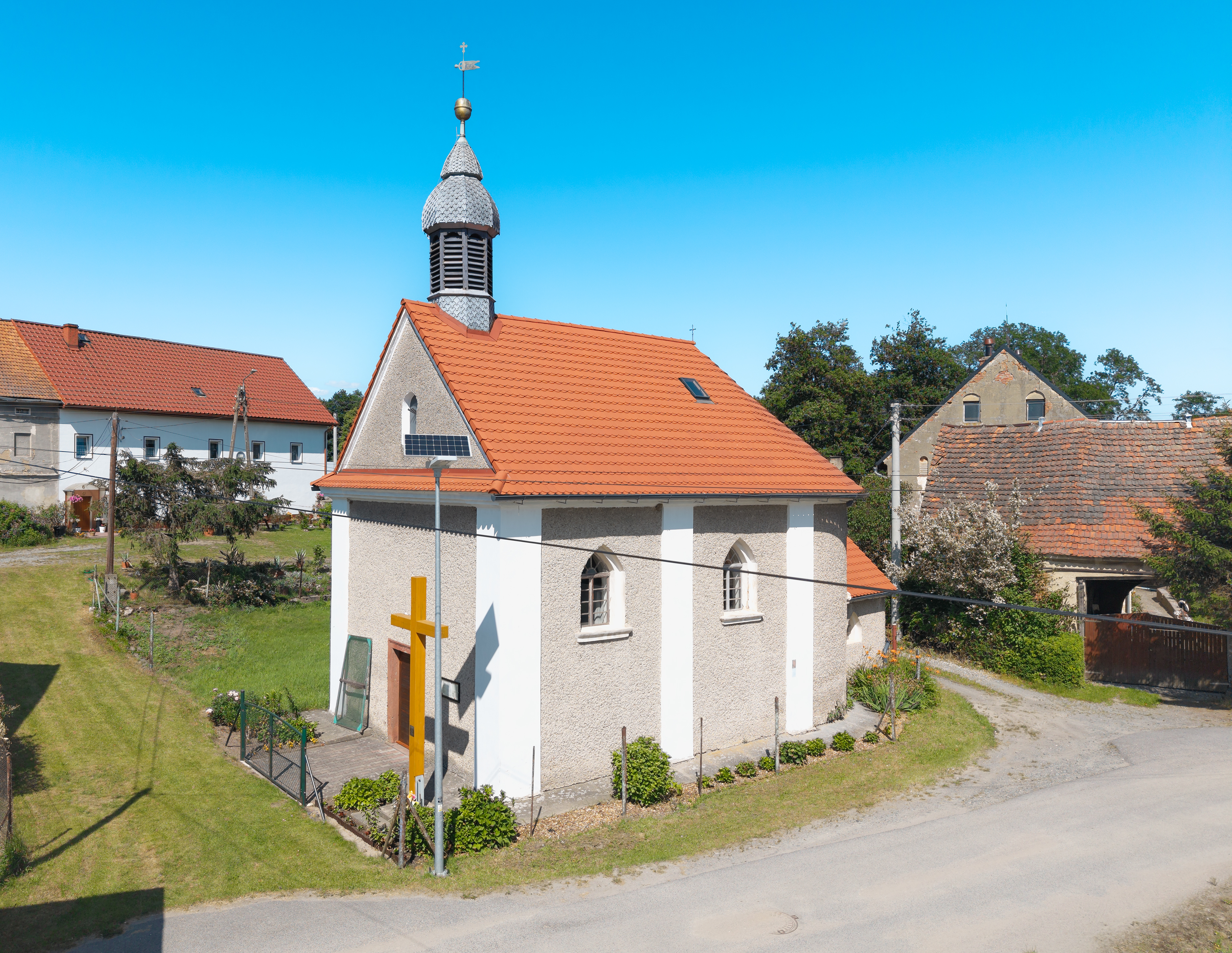

- Location within Poland
- Coordinates: 50°33′13″N 16°49′52″E
- Country: Poland
- Voivodeship: Lower Silesian
- County: Ząbkowice
- Gmina: Ząbkowice Śląskie

Grochowiska [ɡrɔxɔˈviska] is a village in the administrative district of Gmina Ząbkowice Śląskie, within Ząbkowice County, Lower Silesian Voivodeship, in south-western Poland.
