= Rakowice, Ząbkowice County =

Rakowice
- Village
- Location within Poland
- Coordinates: 50°38′44″N 16°51′41″E
- Country: Poland
- Voivodeship: Lower Silesian
- County: Ząbkowice
- Gmina: Ząbkowice Śląskie

Population
  - Total: 60
- Time zone: UTC+1 (CET)
  - Summer (DST): UTC+2 (CEST)
- Vehicle registration: DZA

Rakowice [rakɔˈvit͡sɛ] is a village in the administrative district of Gmina Ząbkowice Śląskie, within Ząbkowice County, Lower Silesian Voivodeship, in south-western Poland.

The name of the village is of Polish origin and comes from the word rak, which means "crayfish".
