= Brodziszów =

- Village
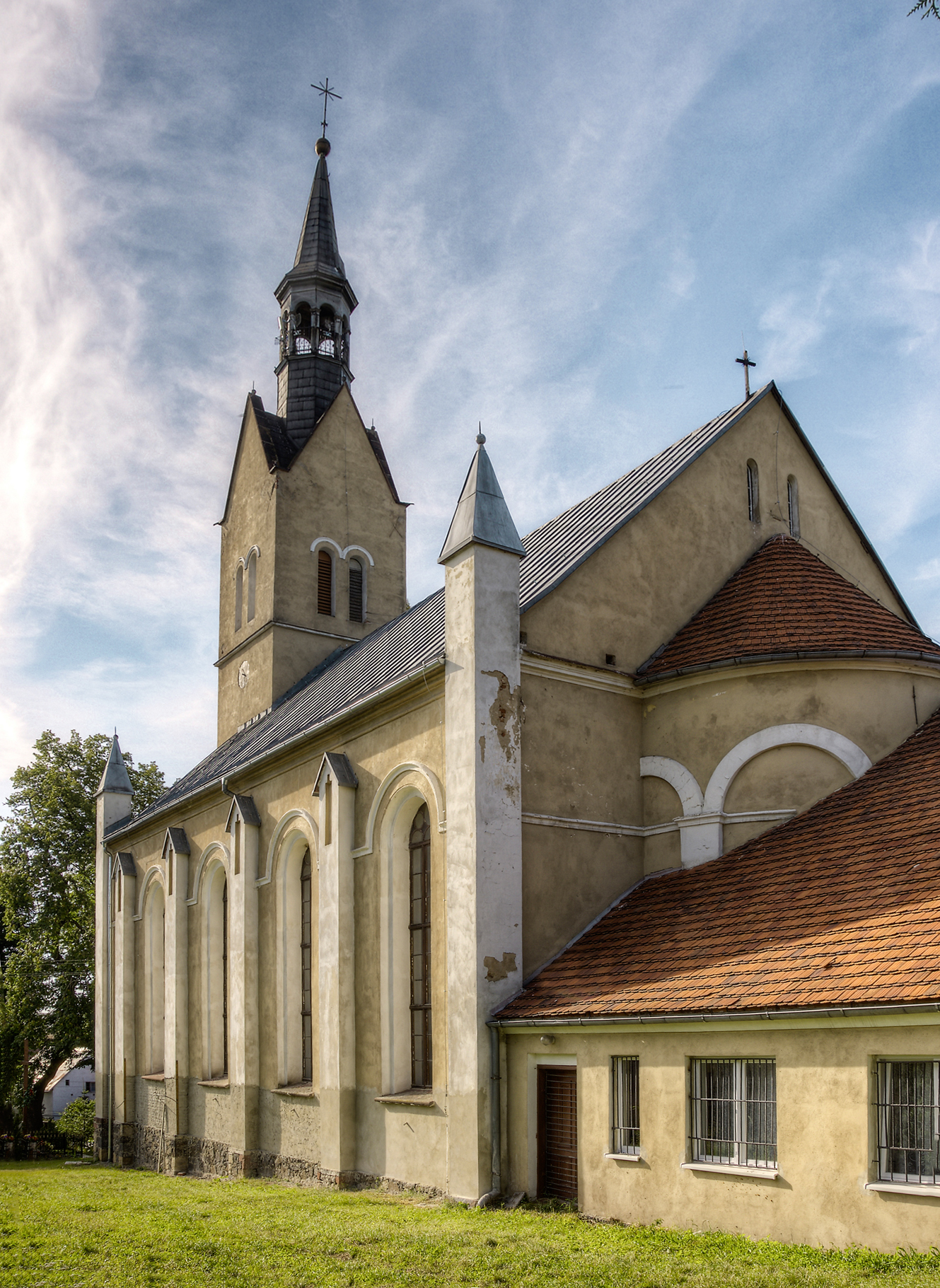
- Church of the Virgin Mary Queen of Poland

- Location within Poland
- Coordinates: 50°38′N 16°47′E
- Country: Poland
- Voivodeship: Lower Silesian
- County: Ząbkowice
- Gmina: Ząbkowice Śląskie

Brodziszów [brɔˈd͡ʑiʂuf] (German: Dittmannsdorf) is a village in the administrative district of Gmina Ząbkowice Śląskie, within Ząbkowice County, Lower Silesian Voivodeship, in south-western Poland.
