= Kluczowa =

- Village
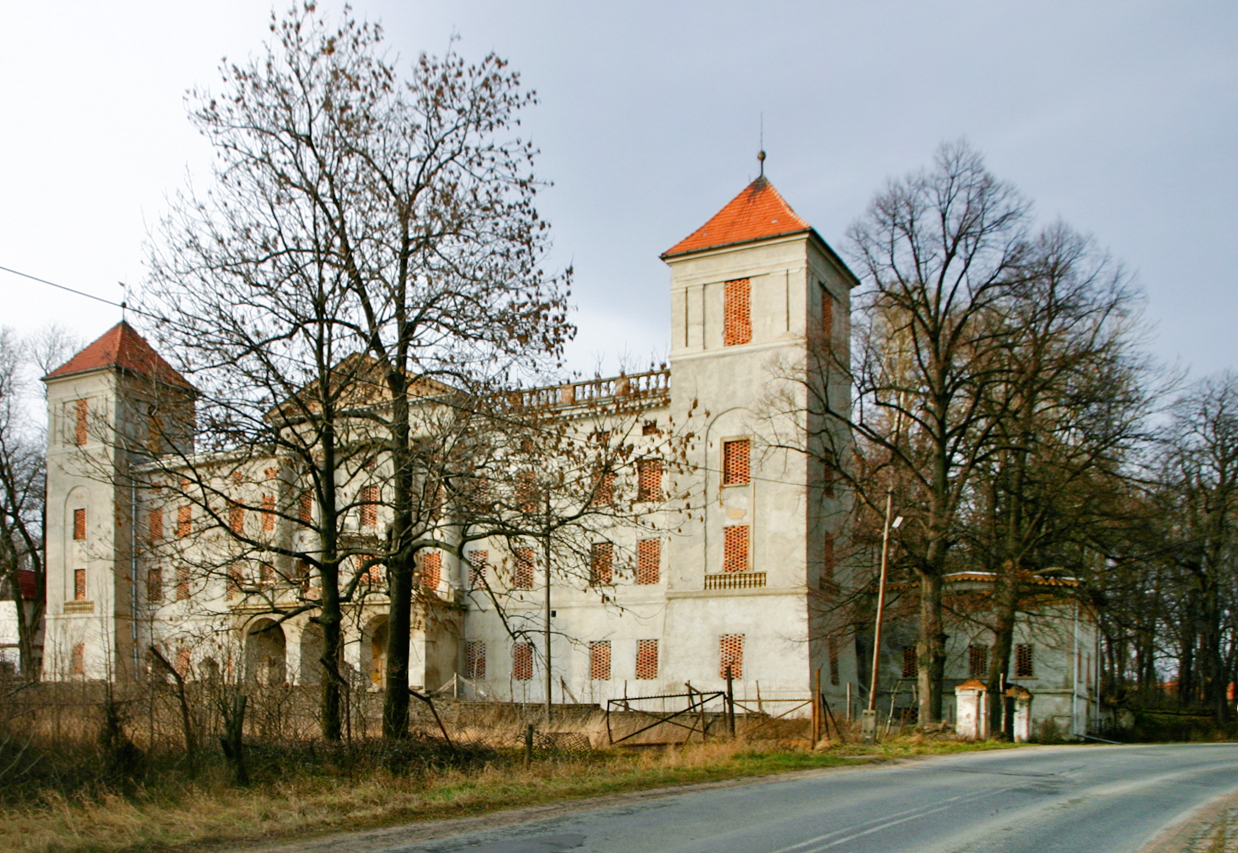
- Kluczowa Palace

- Location within Poland
- Coordinates: 50°39′10″N 16°45′35″E
- Country: Poland
- Voivodeship: Lower Silesian
- County: Ząbkowice
- Gmina: Ząbkowice Śląskie
- Time zone: UTC+1 (CET)
  - Summer (DST): UTC+2 (CEST)
- Vehicle registration: DZA

Kluczowa [kluˈt͡ʂɔva] is a village in the administrative district of Gmina Ząbkowice Śląskie, within Ząbkowice County, Lower Silesian Voivodeship, in south-western Poland.
