= Siodłowice =

- Village
- Location within Poland
- Coordinates: 50°38′02″N 16°50′12″E
- Country: Poland
- Voivodeship: Lower Silesian
- County: Ząbkowice
- Gmina: Ząbkowice Śląskie
- Highest elevation: 330 m (1,080 ft)
- Lowest elevation: 320 m (1,050 ft)
- Population: 60

Siodłowice [ɕɔdwɔˈvit͡sɛ] is a village in the administrative district of Gmina Ząbkowice Śląskie, within Ząbkowice County, Lower Silesian Voivodeship, in south-western Poland.
