= Marcin Gwóźdź =

Polish politician

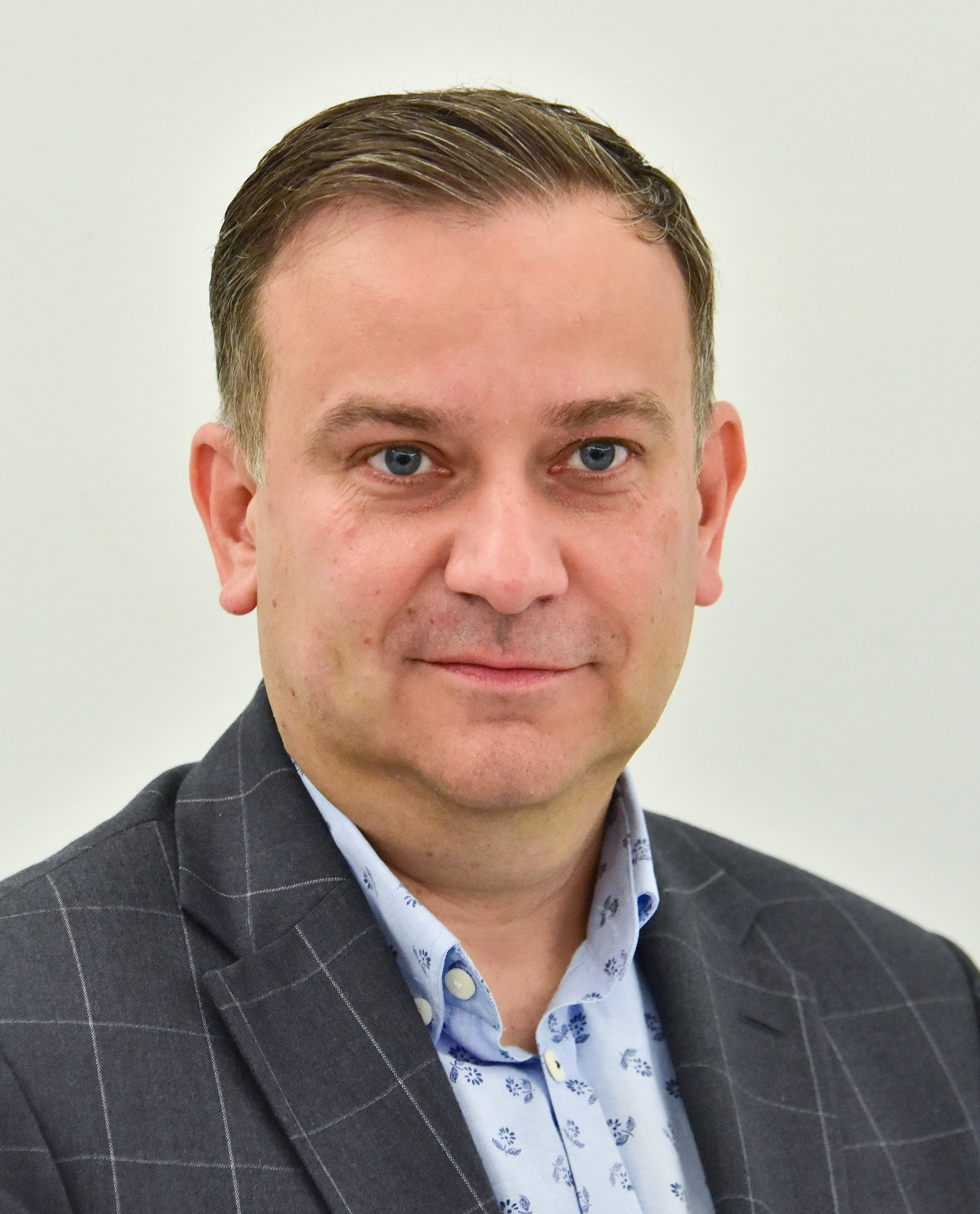
- Born: December 14, 1977 (age 48); Ząbkowice Śląskie
- Education: Poznań University of Technology
- Occupations: local government official, manager, engineer
- Office: Deputy Marshal of the Lower Silesian Voivodeship (2018–2019), Member of the Sejm of the 9th and 10th term (since 2019)
- Political party: Law and Justice

Marcin Piotr Gwóźdź (born December 14, 1977 in Ząbkowice Śląskie) is a Polish manager, engineer, and politician. From 2018 to 2019, he served as Deputy Marshal of the Lower Silesian Voivodeship, and has been a member of the Sejm for the 9th and 10th terms.

== Biography ==
Marcin Gwóźdź completed officer cadet school and graduated with an engineering degree in mechanics and machine construction from the Wrocław University of Science and Technology in 2000 and a master's degree in management and production engineering from the Poznań University of Technology in 2007. He also completed postgraduate studies in banking and finance at the Wrocław University of Economics. Additionally, he passed the exam to become a member of the supervisory boards of State Treasury companies and obtained restructuring advisor qualifications.

For several years, he worked as an engineer and manager, starting as a designer and technologist in construction plants. From 2007 to 2016, he was the president of the board of the Delfin Water and Sewage Company in Ząbkowice Śląskie. He then headed the Kłodzko Health Resorts until 2018. In April 2018, he became vice-president and a board member of the joint-stock company KGHM TFI.

He became involved in the activities of the Law and Justice party. In the 2010 and 2014 local elections, he was elected as a councilor of the Ząbkowice County from its list (he did not run again in 2018). On November 19, 2018, he was appointed Deputy Marshal of the Lower Silesian Voivodeship.

In the 2019 elections, he obtained a mandate as a member of the 9th term of the Sejm, running in the Wałbrzych constituency and receiving 8049 votes. In the 2023 elections, he was re-elected, obtaining 23,434 votes.
