= Frankenstein gravediggers scandal =

1606 event in Czech Silesia

The Frankenstein town gravediggers scandal
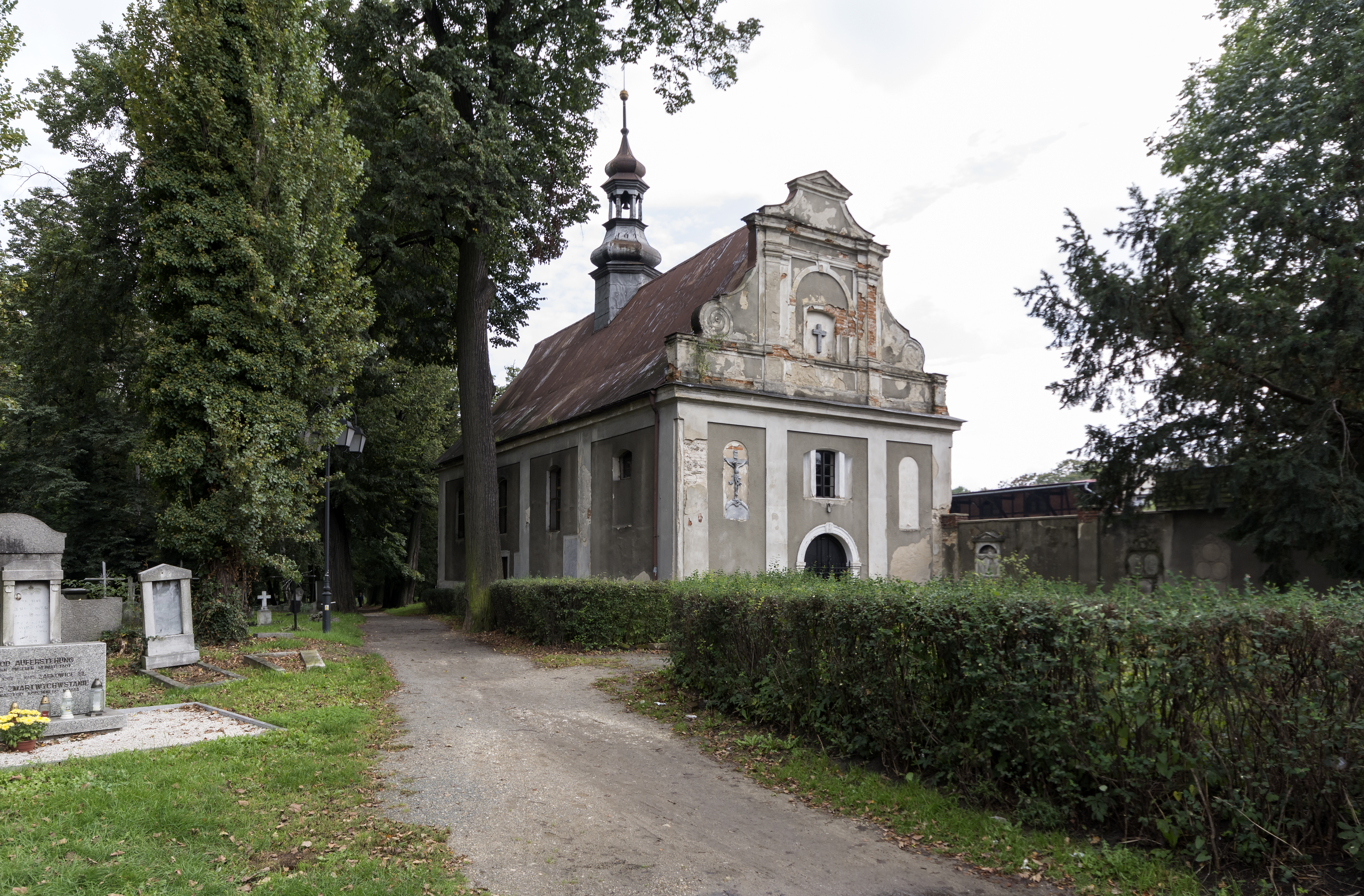
- Chapel of St. Nicholas in Ząbkowice Śląskie
- Duration: 20 September 1606 - 13 February 1607
- Location: Ząbkowice Śląskie, Poland; 50°35′33.9″N 16°48′46.7″E
- Convicted: A total of 17 people were executed in this case, by mutilation and burning at the stake

The Frankenstein town gravediggers scandal is the case of the capture and sentencing in 1606 of gravediggers from the town of Frankenstein in Silesia in the Bohemian Crown (now Ząbkowice Śląskie in Lower Silesia, Poland) who were accused of witchcraft, desecrating corpses and bringing plague. These events are related to the small chapel of St. Nicholas that still exists today, standing on the site of the old cemetery founded in 1552 at today's ul. 1 Maja in Ząbkowice Śląskie.

== History ==
In 1606, there was a plague in the city. Eight gravediggers were accused of causing it (three women and five men): Wenzel Förster, a gravedigger for 28 years, and his assistant Georg Freidiger from Strzegom – for the mixing and preparation of poisons. Both were outed by the farmhand Förster. In total, eight people were arrested.

During the investigation, the suspects were subjected to torture, during which they admitted that they had prepared poisonous powder from the corpses. They scattered this powder several times in various houses and on their doorsteps. They also smeared it on door handles and knockers, which caused many people to get poisoned and die. Moreover, they stole money from houses and robbed corpses, taking cloaks from them. They were also supposed to cut open the bellies of dead pregnant women to extract the fetuses, and eat the hearts of small children raw. They admitted to robbing local churches of altar cloths and two wind-up clocks, which they also powdered to use in witchcraft. One of them, was also supposed to defile the body of a young girl.

The trial took place on September 20, 1606. The accused were found guilty and sentenced to death by mutilation and burning at the stake. On October 5 of the same year, the trial of the accomplices whom the gravediggers identified under torture was still underway. They were also sentenced to death. The last execution took place on February 13, 1607. A total of 17 people were executed in this case.

== Echoes of the scandal ==
These events were famous throughout Europe, as evidenced by, among others, publication of sermons in Leipzig. It is also known that it was then covered by the newspaper Newe Zeytung published in Augsburg.

English writer Mary Shelley may have been alluding to this story when she named Victor Frankenstein, the protagonist of her famous 1818 novel about a scientist who creates a monster out of the human corpses that he steals from cemeteries.

== Bibliography ==
- Paweł Kaptur, Rethinking Inspirations for Mary Shelley's Frankenstein: A New Look at the Case of the Silesian Gravediggers’ Scandal of 1606
- F. Toenniges 700 Jahre Frankenstein Schlesien 1286–1986, Eine Sammlung zeitgenössischer Documente, Kürten 1986, p. 19
