= Jaworek, Ząbkowice County =

Jaworek
- Village
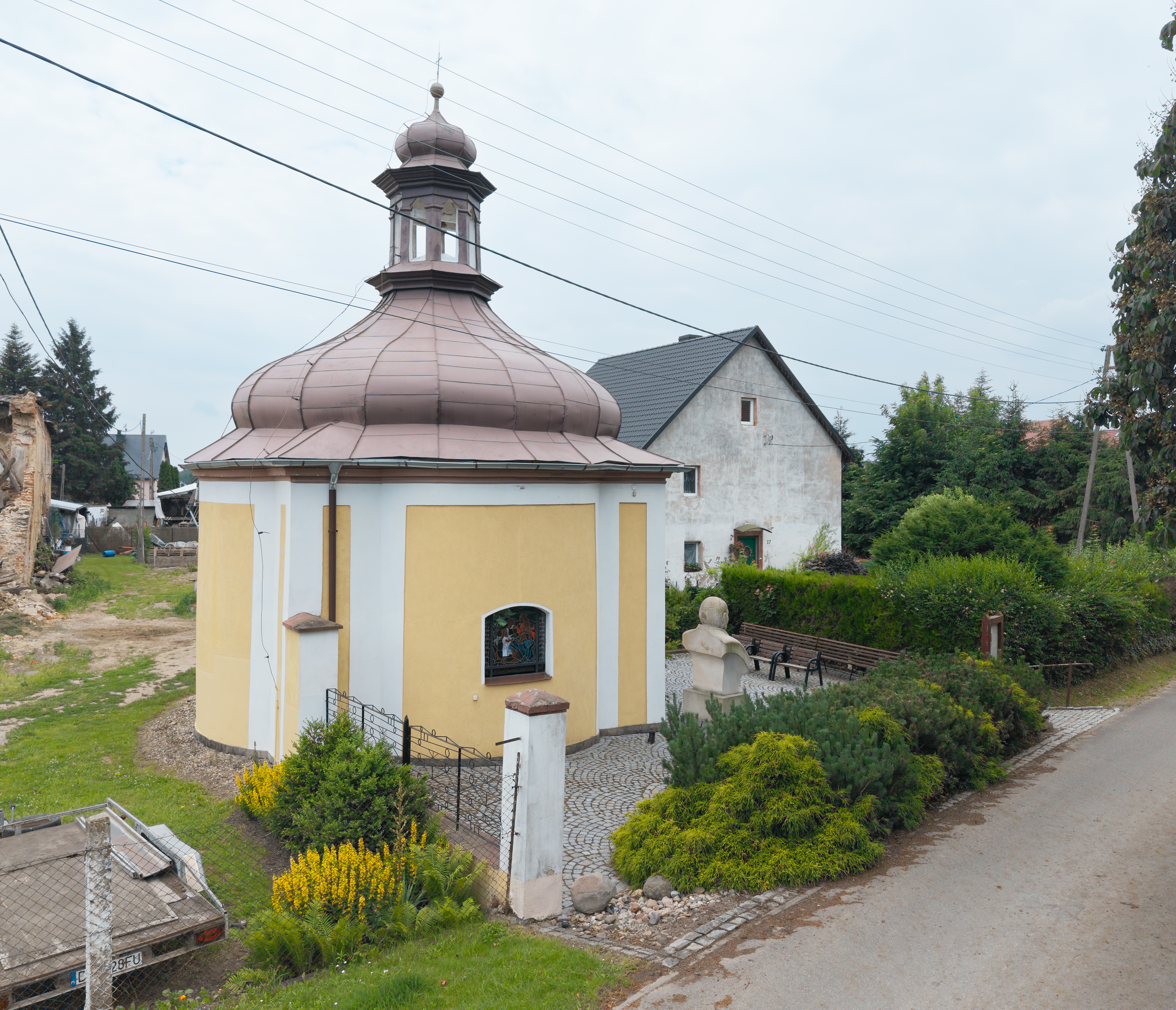
- Saint John the Baptist church in Jaworek

- Location within Poland
- Coordinates: 50°35′55″N 16°50′09″E
- Country: Poland
- Voivodeship: Lower Silesian
- County: Ząbkowice
- Gmina: Ząbkowice Śląskie
- Time zone: UTC+1 (CET)
  - Summer (DST): UTC+2 (CEST)
- Vehicle registration: DZA

Jaworek [jaˈvɔrɛk] is a village in the administrative district of Gmina Ząbkowice Śląskie, within Ząbkowice County, Lower Silesian Voivodeship, in south-western Poland.

== Etymology ==
The name of the village is of Polish origin, and comes from word jawor ("sycamore maple").
