= Stolec, Lower Silesian Voivodeship =

Stolec
- Village
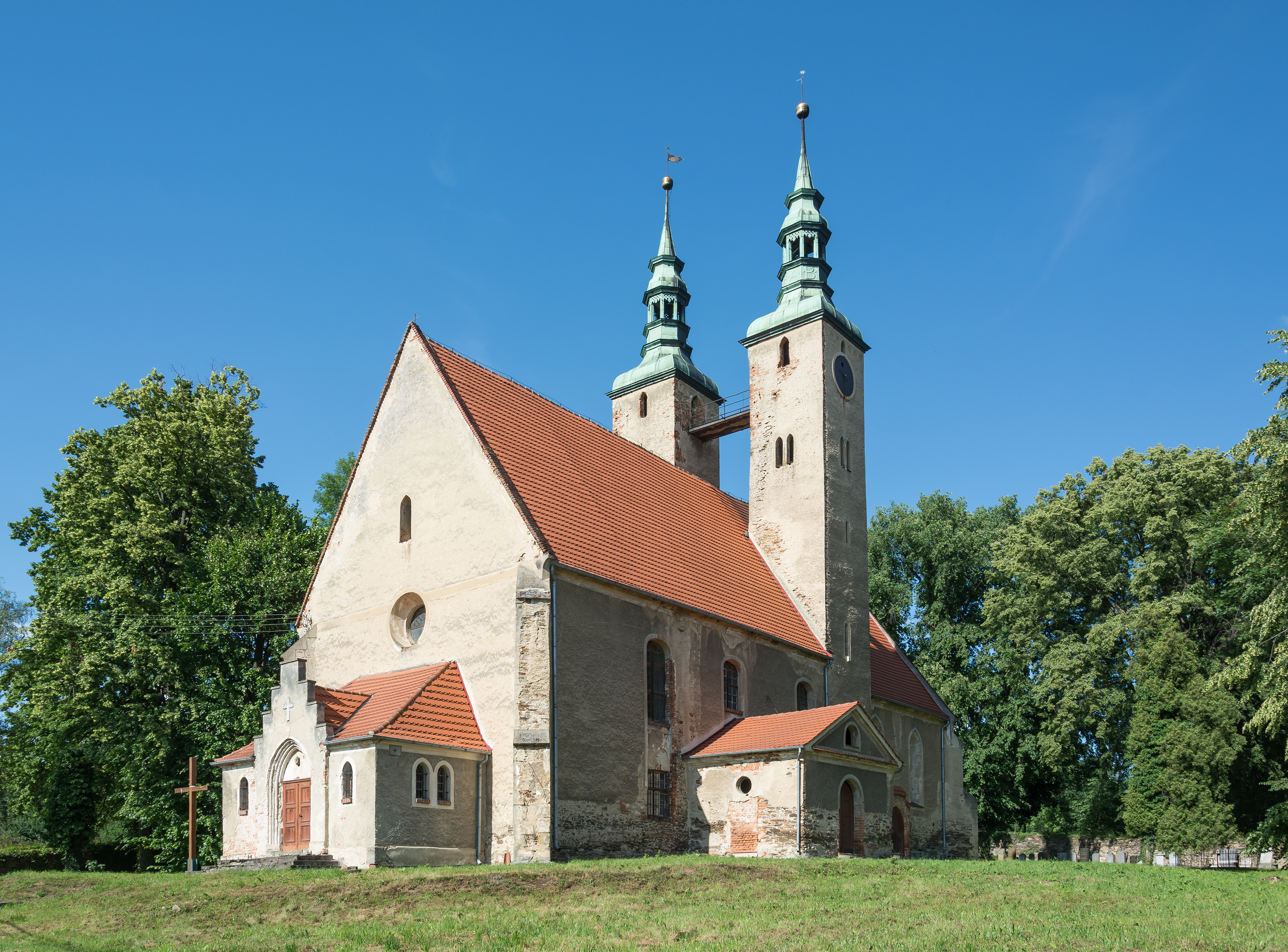

- Location within Poland
- Coordinates: 50°36′N 16°53′E
- Country: Poland
- Voivodeship: Lower Silesian
- County: Ząbkowice
- Gmina: Ząbkowice Śląskie
- Population (approx.): 1,200

Stolec [ˈstɔlɛt͡s] (translation: stool) is a village in the administrative district of Gmina Ząbkowice Śląskie, within Ząbkowice County, Lower Silesian Voivodeship, in south-western Poland.
