= Sadlno, Lower Silesian Voivodeship =

Sadlno
- Neighbourhood of Ząbkowice Śląskie
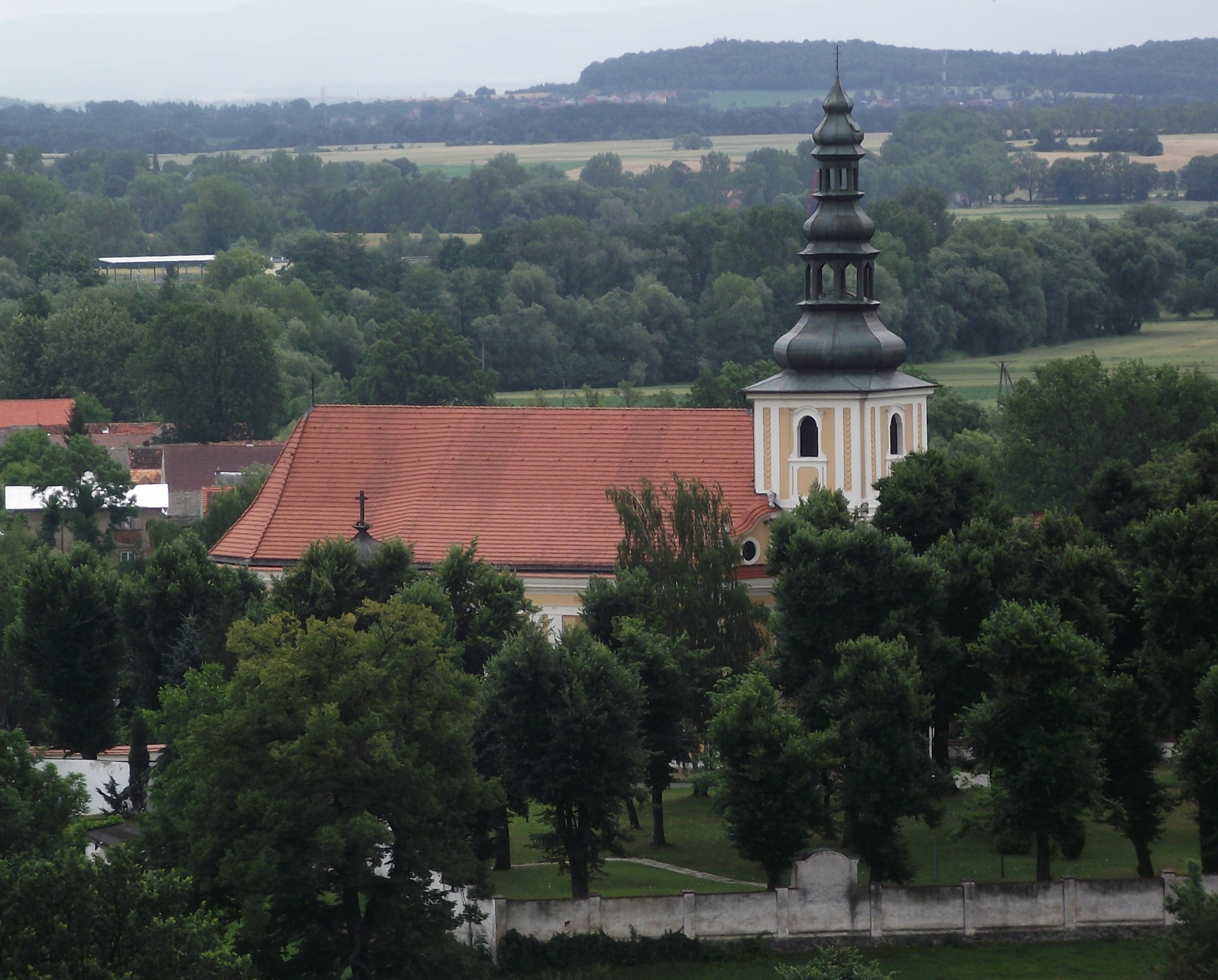
- Saint Hedwig church

- Location within Poland
- Coordinates: 50°34′29″N 16°50′09″E
- Country: Poland
- Voivodeship: Lower Silesian
- County: Ząbkowice
- Gmina: Ząbkowice Śląskie
- Town: Ząbkowice Śląskie
- Within town limits: 1973
- Time zone: UTC+1 (CET)
  - Summer (DST): UTC+2 (CEST)
- Vehicle registration: DZA

Sadlno [ˈsadlnɔ] is a neighbourhood of Ząbkowice Śląskie, Poland, bearing the status of sołectwo, located in the south-eastern part of the town.

== History ==
At its origin, Sadlno was a Slavic trading settlement located on the Amber Road and mentioned in records as early as in 1207. Later, Ząbkowice Śląskie were founded next to Sadlno.

In 1973, it was included within the town limits of Ząbkowice Śląskie.

== Sights ==
Its most prominent monument is the baroque Saint Hedwig of Andechs Church.
