= Ewa Sonnenberg =

Polish poet (born 1967)

- Born: 30 March 1967 (age 59); Ząbkowice Śląskie, Poland
- Education: Wrocław Academy of Music; Jagiellonian University
- Occupations: Poet; academic; essayist; pianist
- Writing career
- Language: Polish
- Years active: 1990–present
- Notable work: Hazard (a collection of poems)
- Notable awards: Georg Trakl Award, 1995; Four columns award, 2012

Ewa Sonnenberg (born 30 March 1967) is a Polish poet, pianist, essayist and academic who has won several awards for her work. A lesbian, she is best known for her volume entitled Hazard.

== Early life and career ==
Sonnenberg was born on 30 March 1967 in Ząbkowice Śląskie in south-western Poland. For a time, she lived with her grandparents near Srebrna Góra at the foothills of the Owl Mountains, which she explored as a child. She went to school in Lubin and then graduated from the Wrocław Academy of Music, having studied the piano with Grzegorz Kurzyński. In 1990, she was in a car accident in which her hands were badly damaged, raising doubts about her ability to pursue a career as a pianist at a high level. Having written prize-winning poetry at high school she returned to writing while studying to be one of the first master's graduates in literary and artistic studies at the Institute of Polish Philology of the Jagiellonian University in Kraków, later becoming a lecturer at the same institute. Sonnenberg made her home in Wrocław and organized cultural evenings in which she would play the piano and recite her poetry, later inviting other performers to join her. She belongs to the Perfokarta group of cybernetic and experimental poets. Sonnenberg is openly lesbian: her poems are always addressed to women and have been described as "masculine".

== Publications ==
Her works include the following volumes of poetry: Hazard (1995), The Land of a Thousand Notebooks (1997), Planeta (1997), Smycz (2000), Płonący tram (2001), A lesson in insight (2005), Written on sand (2007), Collected poems (2014), Hologramy (2015), and Poems for one man (2017); the prose poem Obca (2015) and the book of essays, My paper loves (2016). She has also published Page of the Queen. A Fairy Tale for Lovers (2006) and Encyclopedia of the madman (2006). Her poems have been translated from Polish into English, French, Spanish, German, Swedish, Turkish, Russian, Hungarian, Slovenian, Slovak, Czech, Serbian, Macedonian, Bosnian, Italian and Ukrainian.

== Awards and recognition ==
For her volume Hazard, Sonnenberg received the Georg Trakl Award in 1995, granted by a jury chaired by Maciej Słomczyński. She was Best Poet at the 9th International Literary Ilinden Festival in North Macedonia in 2008 and received the Four Columns Literary Award for lifetime achievement (2012). In 2016 she was a finalist of the Orpheus Poetry Award for the volume Hologramy and in 2018 she was nominated for this award for the volume Wiersze dla jeden Człowiek (Poems for one man). She has been a scholarship recipient from the Fund for Assistance to Independent Polish Literature and Science (Paris - 1998) and has twice received a scholarship from the Ministry of Culture and National Heritage (2001, 2008).

In 2014, 50 of the benches in Planty Park in Kraków had a name plate added to them of an author who either came from or was connected with Kraków. A further 50 were added a year later. Next to the name was a QR code, which enabled people to access brief information about the author and read an excerpt from their work. This was one of the activities associated with the Kraków UNESCO City of Literature celebrations of that year. Sonnenberg was one of those recognised in this way.

Her original manuscripts are held by the National Library of Poland in Warsaw. Her poems have been included in a wide variety of anthologies published throughout Europe and in the US and India.
