= Bobolice, Lower Silesian Voivodeship =

Bobolice
- Village
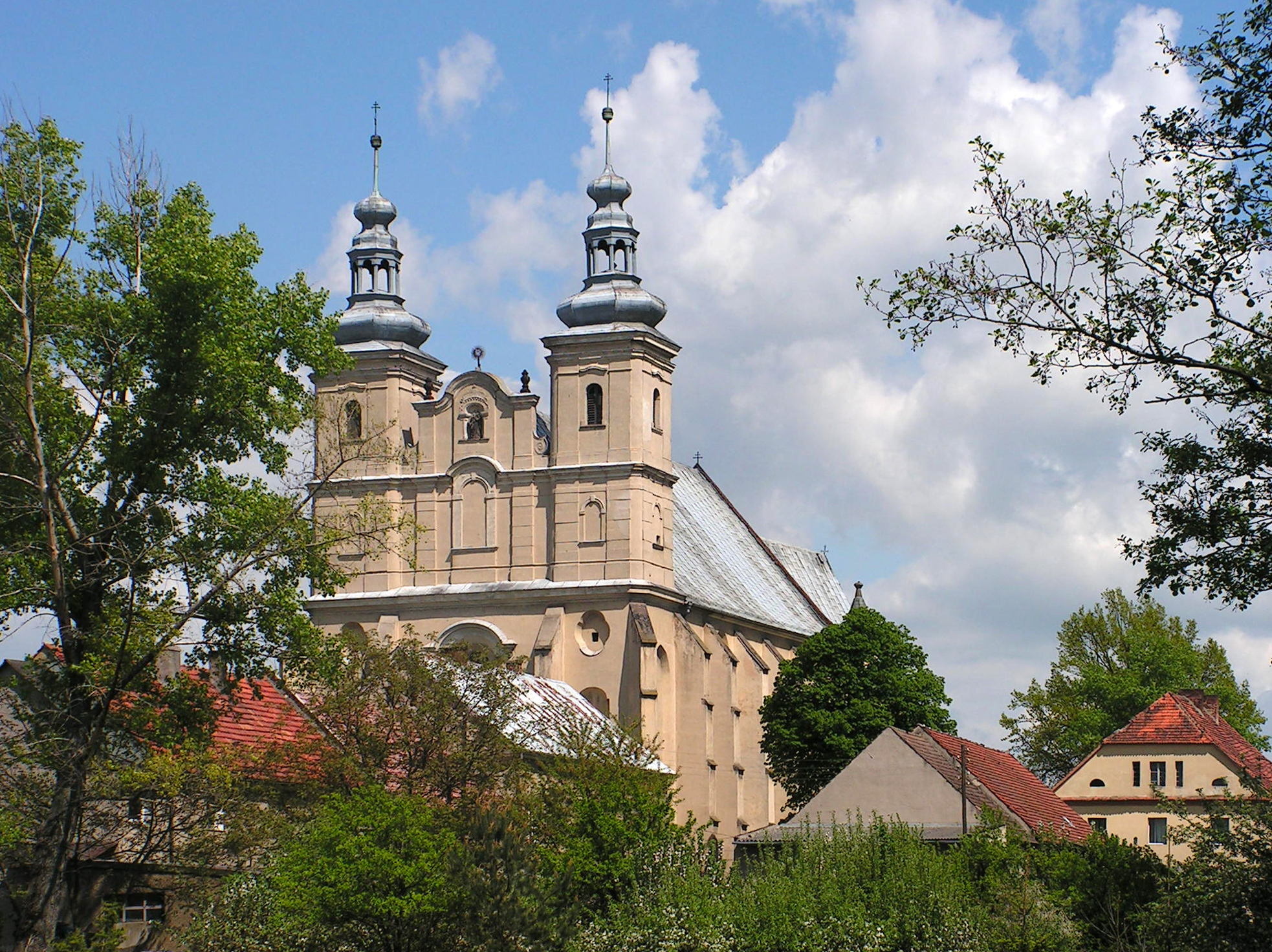
- Church of the Virgin Mary

- Location within Poland
- Coordinates: 50°37′24″N 16°51′45″E
- Country: Poland
- Voivodeship: Lower Silesian
- County: Ząbkowice
- Gmina: Ząbkowice Śląskie
- Website: http://www.twojebobolice.abc.pl

Bobolice [bɔbɔˈlit͡sɛ] is a village in the administrative district of Gmina Ząbkowice Śląskie, within Ząbkowice County, Lower Silesian Voivodeship, in south-western Poland.
