= Koziniec, Lower Silesian Voivodeship =

Koziniec
- Village
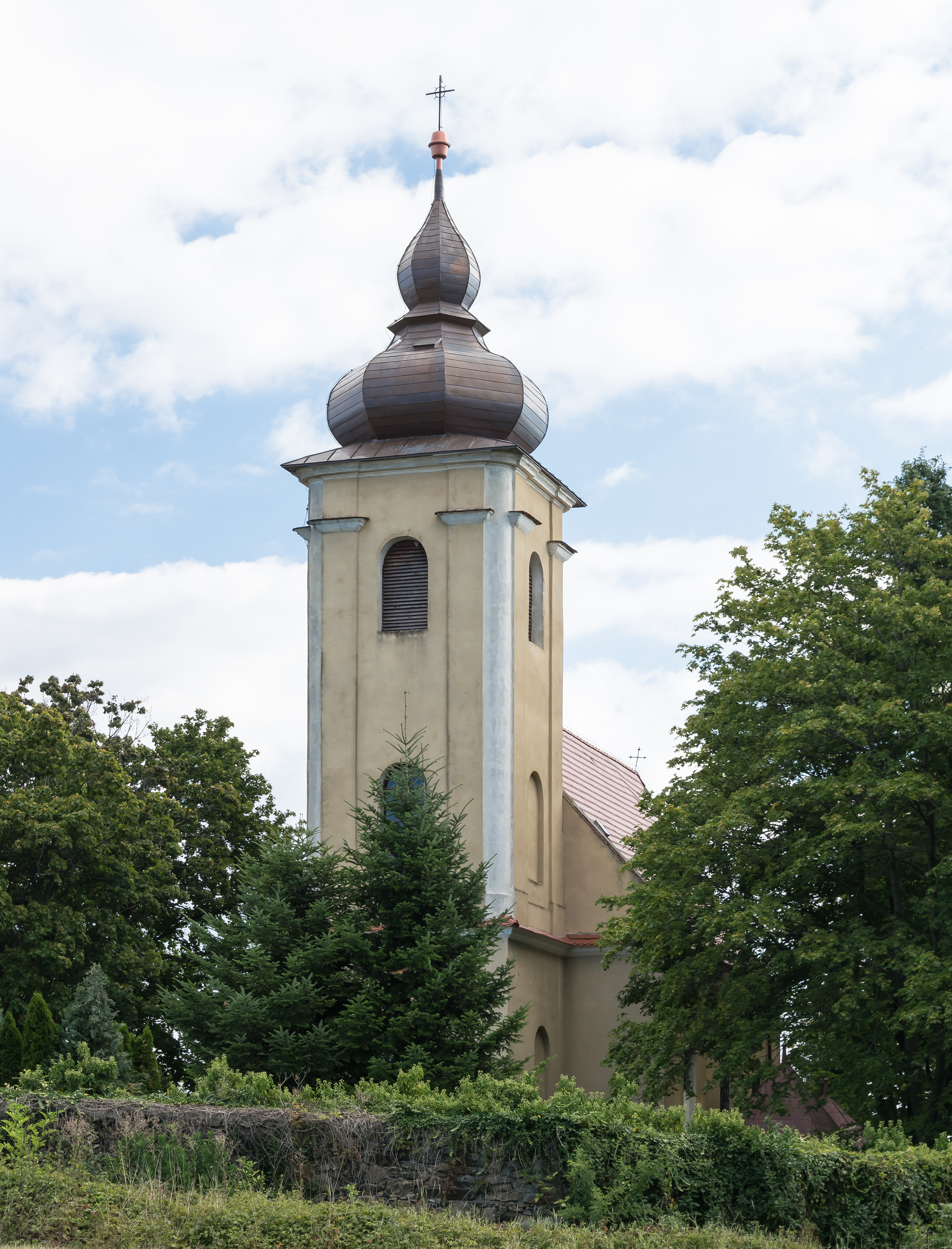
- 2019 Kościół św. Jakuba Apostoła w Kozińcu

- Location within Poland
- Coordinates: 50°37′N 16°45′E
- Country: Poland
- Voivodeship: Lower Silesian
- County: Ząbkowice
- Gmina: Ząbkowice Śląskie
- Time zone: UTC+1 (CET)
  - Summer (DST): UTC+2 (CEST)
- Vehicle registration: DZA

Koziniec [kɔˈʑiɲɛt͡s] is a village in the administrative district of Gmina Ząbkowice Śląskie, within Ząbkowice County, Lower Silesian Voivodeship, in south-western Poland.

Town rights were granted in 1244 and revoked before 1287.
