= Ząbkowice Śląskie =

Town in Lower Silesian Voivodeship, Poland

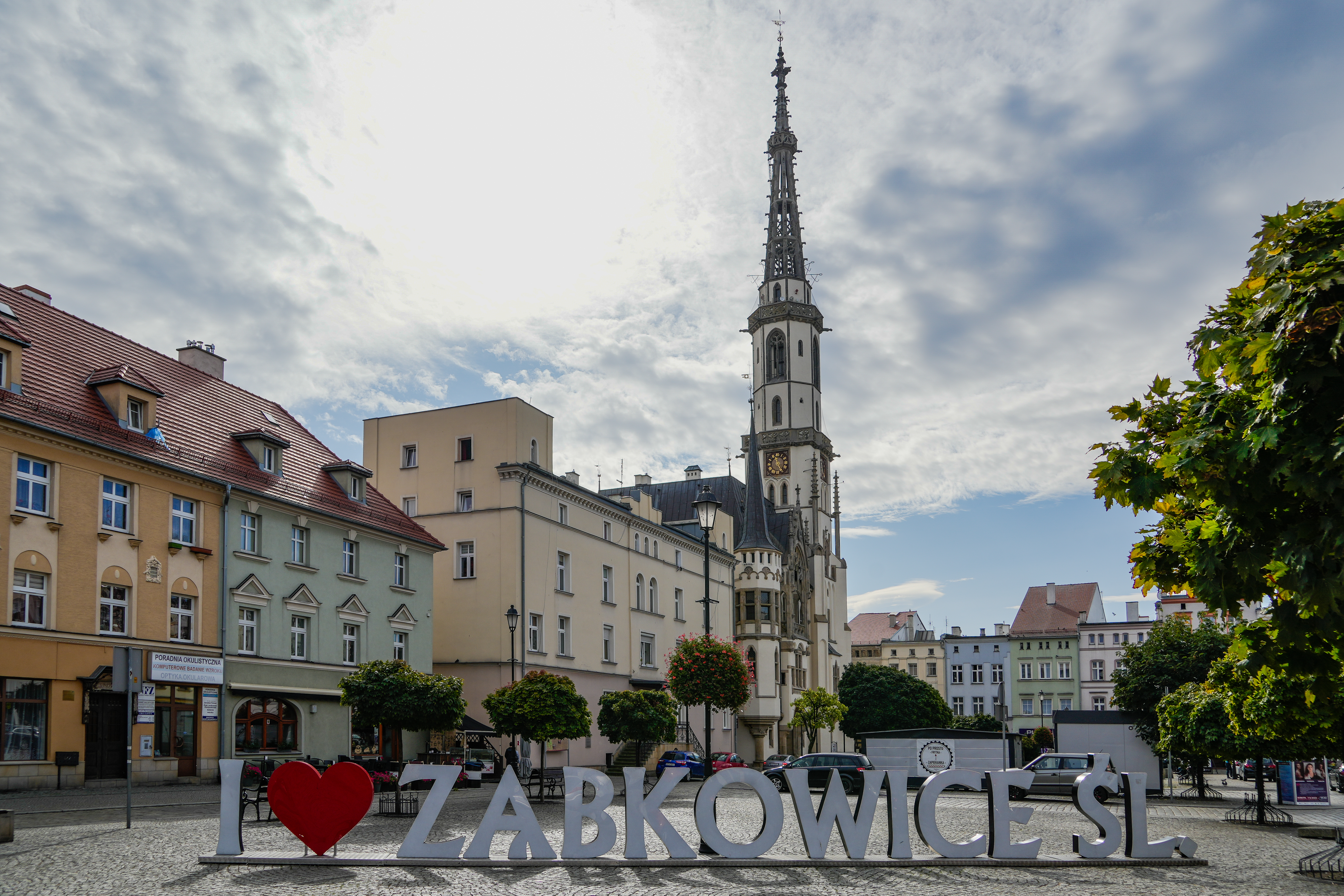
- Market Square and town hall

- Coat of arms

- Location within Poland
- Coordinates: 50°35′N 16°49′E
- Country: Poland
- Voivodeship: Lower Silesian
- County: Ząbkowice
- Gmina: Ząbkowice Śląskie

Government
  - Mayor: Marcin Orzeszek

Area
  - Total: 13.67 km^{2} (5.28 sq mi)
- Elevation: 280 m (920 ft)

Population (2019-06-30)
  - Total: 15,004
  - Density: 1,098/km^{2} (2,843/sq mi)
- Time zone: UTC+1 (CET)
  - Summer (DST): UTC+2 (CEST)
- Postal code: 57–200 and 57–201
- Vehicle registration: DZA
- Website: zabkowice.pl

Ząbkowice Śląskie (Zombkovitze [zɔmpkɔˈvit͡sɛ ˈɕlɔ̃skʲɛ]; German: Frankenstein in Schlesien) is a town in Lower Silesian Voivodeship, in south-western Poland. It is the seat of Ząbkowice County and of a local municipality called Gmina Ząbkowice Śląskie. The town lies approximately 63 kilometres (39 miles) south of the regional capital Wrocław. As of 2019, it had a population of 15,004.

== History ==
The town was established in Silesia as Frankenstein in the late 13th century by German settlers, during the reign of Henry IV Probus of the Piast dynasty, following the Mongol invasion of Poland. It was founded in the vicinity of the old Polish settlement of Sadlno, through which ran a trade route connecting Silesia and Bohemia. The town was sited on a piece of land that belonged partly to the episcopal lands of Zwrócona and partly to the monastery at Trzebnica. The town was located between the sites of two previously existing towns that had failed to attract enough settlers: Frankenberg (Przyłęk) and Löwenstein (Koziniec), and inherited its German name from both. Its positioning on the so-called "King's Road" between Prague and Wrocław, not too far from the commercially important city of Kłodzko, would favour the development of the town. The town received municipal rights around 1280, the first mention of civitas Frankenstein is dated 10 January 1287. In 1295, Duke Bolko I the Strict granted the town staple right for salt and lead. At the beginning of the 14th century, the first town hall and the castle were erected. The city remained under rule of the Polish Piast dynasty before it was sold to the Bohemian (Czech) king in 1351.

In 1428, the city was invaded by the Hussites. In 1456, Bohemian king Ladislaus the Posthumous gave the city in hereditary possession to the Czech noble Podiebrad family, to which it belonged until 1569. The city was heavily damaged in 1468, during the Bohemian–Hungarian War, and until 1490 it belonged to the Kingdom of Hungary, before becoming again part of Bohemia. In the 16th century, the castle and defensive walls were rebuilt. Trade and craft flourished. In the early 17th century, the plague killed about one third of the population, and it has been speculated that the Frankenstein gravediggers scandal at that time may have inspired the Frankenstein story. The Thirty Years' War (1618–1648) ended the town's prosperity. Austrian and Swedish troops marched through the city, which was severely damaged. Afterwards, until the late 19th century, it remained a small town. In 1742 it was annexed by Prussia. In 1826, Fryderyk Chopin travelled through the town.

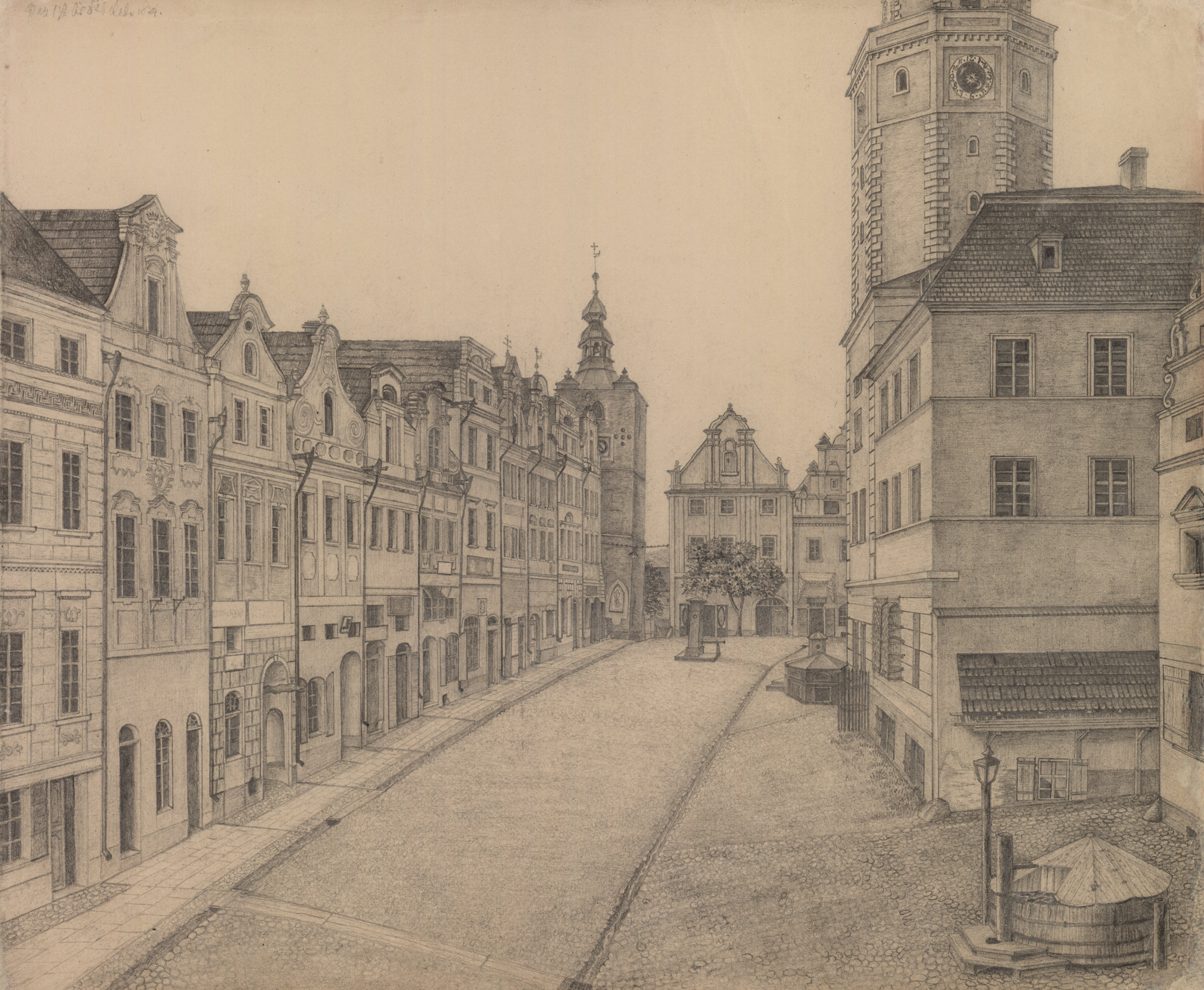
Mid-19th century view of the market square

In 1858, the town burned down and had to be rebuilt. On this occasion, the upper part of the 15th-century leaning tower was reconstructed in a straight manner. The town was a county seat from 1816 to 1945. From 1871 to 1918 it was part of the German Empire. In the final stages of World War II in 1945, a German-conducted death march of thousands of prisoners of several subcamps of the Auschwitz concentration camp passed through the town towards the Gross-Rosen concentration camp, and additionally some prisoners from the Nazi prison in Kłodzko were moved to the town. The town was not destroyed during the war. After Germany's defeat, the town again became part of Poland, and was renamed to its historic Polish name Ząbkowice, with the addition of the adjective Śląskie in 1946. The totality of its population was was expelled. Ząbkowice Śląskie was repopulated by Poles expelled from former Eastern Poland, annexed by the Soviet Union, as well as those arriving from central Poland.

== Sights ==
Ząbkowice Śląskie is often called the Silesian Pisa as it is known for its Leaning Tower (Krzywa Wieża), which is one of the main attractions of the town. However, there are also tourist attractions such as the 13th-century fortifications and the ruins of a 14th-century castle.

- The Leaning Tower (Krzywa Wieża)
- 13th century fortifications
- Main Post Office
- Ruins of the Ducal Castle
- Saint Anne's Church
- Town Hall
- Church of the Nativity of Virgin Mary
- Saint Hedwig's Church
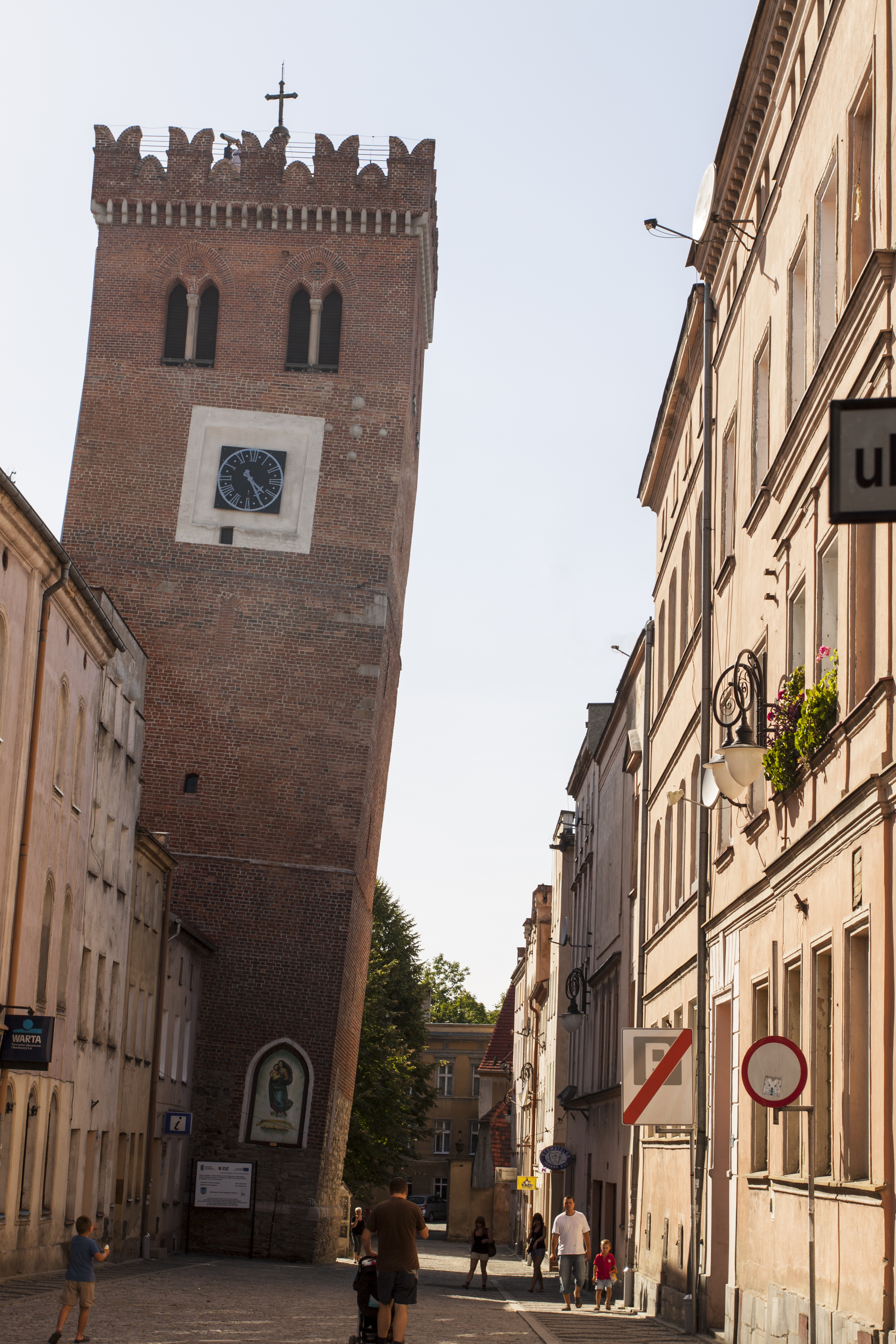
Leaning Tower

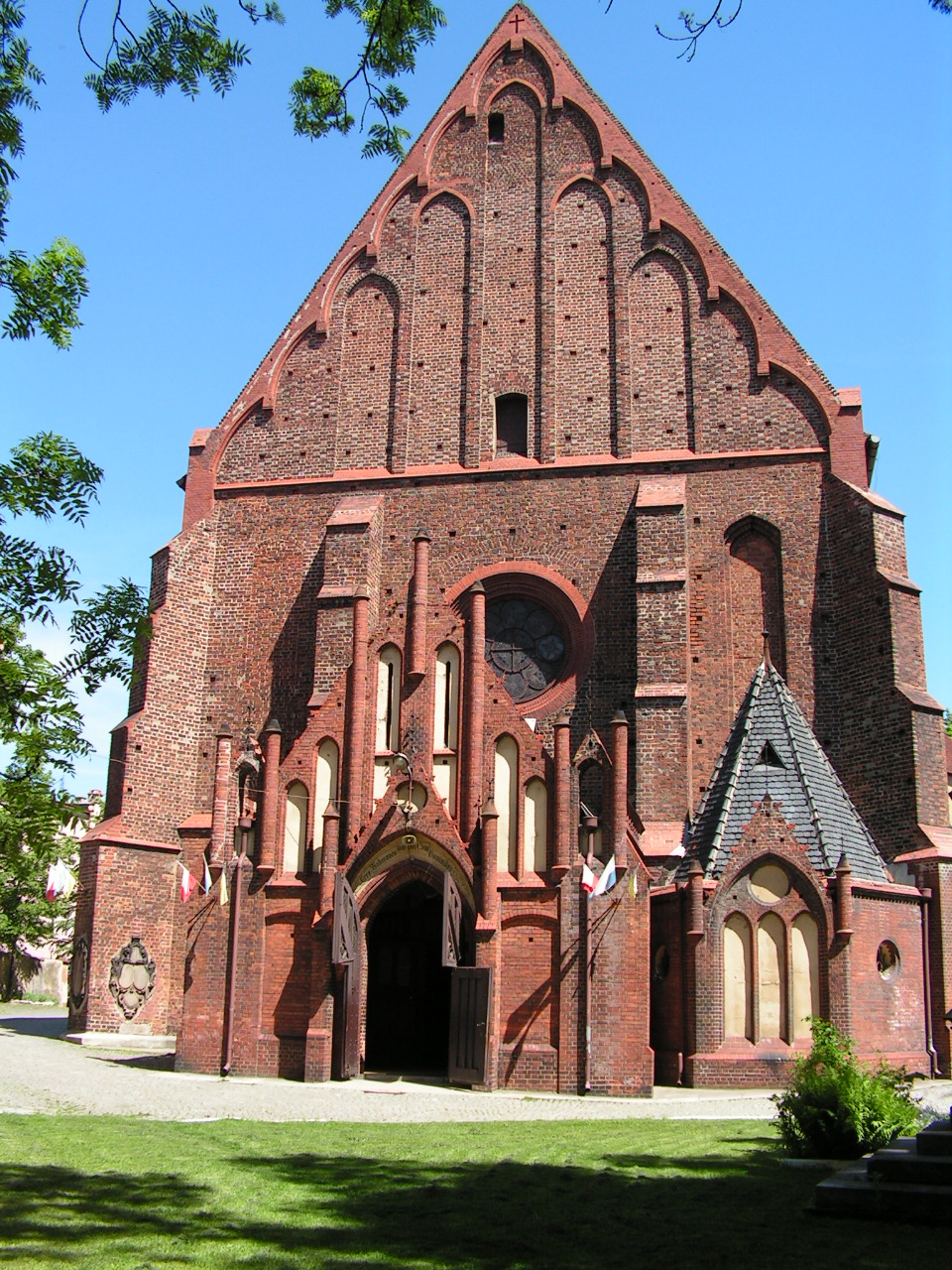
Saint Anne church

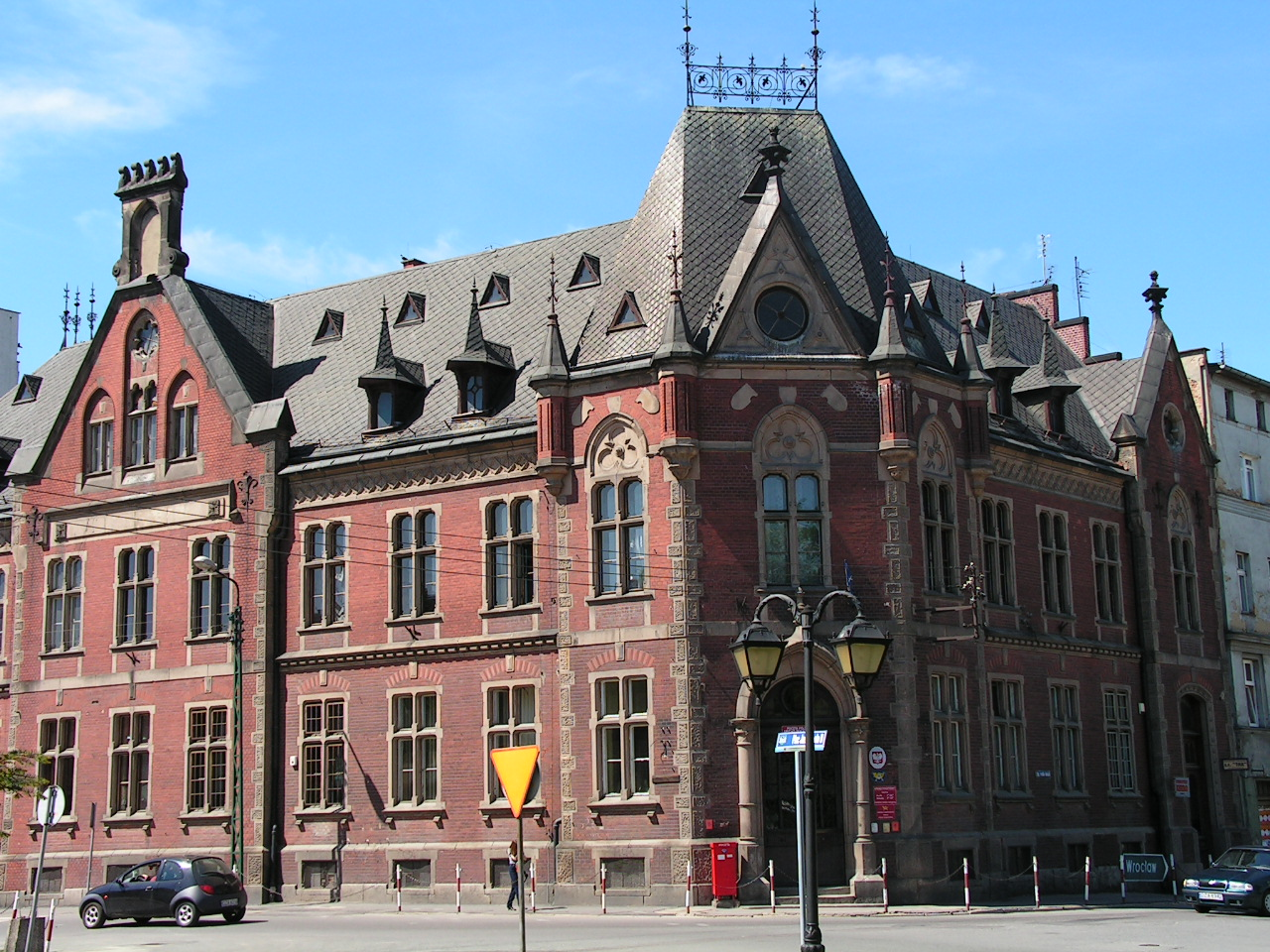
Main Post Office

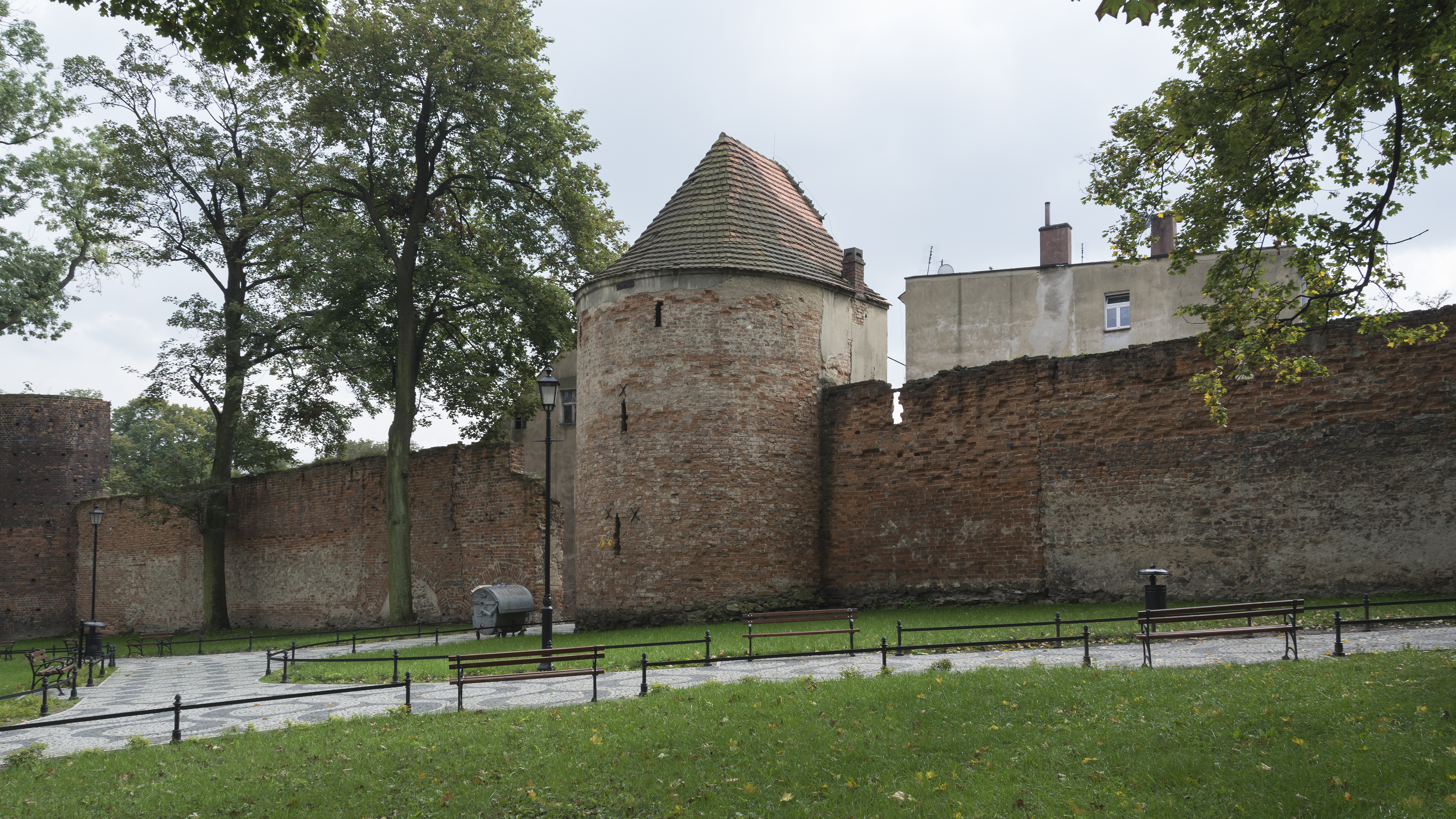
Town walls

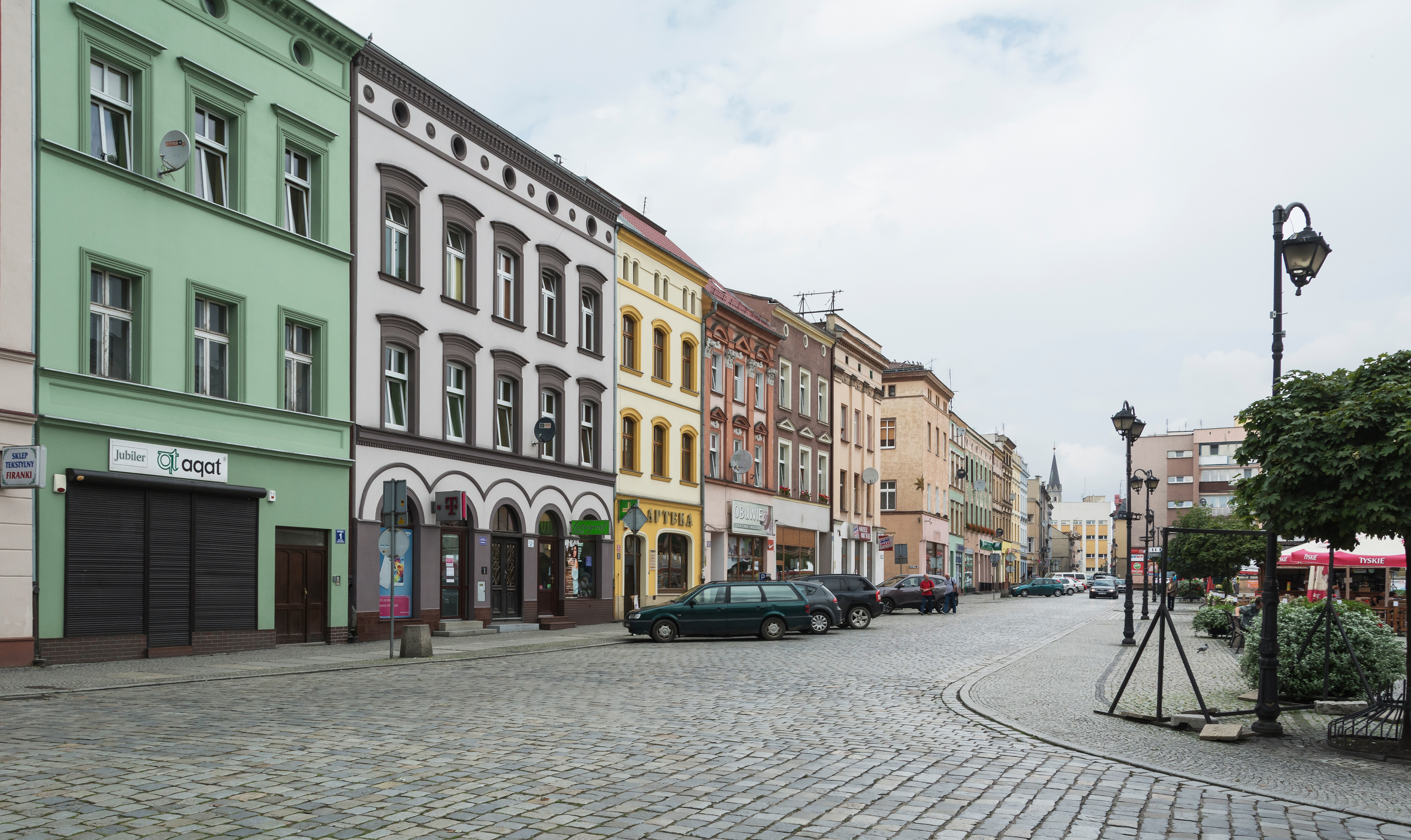
Preserved townhouses at the Market Square

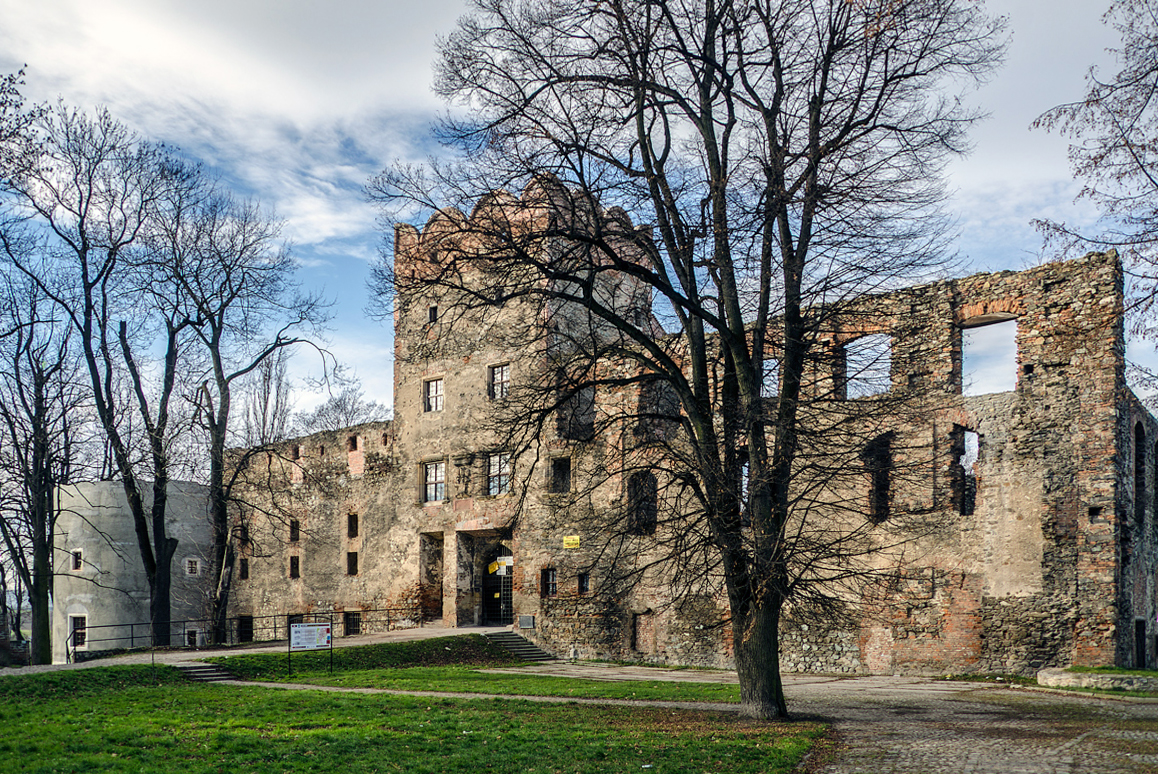
Ruins of the Ducal Castle

== Demographics ==
Historical population

Year	Pop.	±%
1871	7,330	—
1880	7,861	+7.2%
1890	8,140	+3.5%
1900	7,890	−3.1%
1910	8,737	+10.7%

Year	Pop.	±%
1925	10,093	+15.5%
1939	10,857	+7.6%
1950	7,450	−31.4%
1960	11,717	+57.3%
2010	15,830	+35.1%

== Notable people ==
- David Pareus (1548–1622), German Reformed Protestant theologian and reformer
- Karl von Strotha (1786–1870), Prussian officer and Minister of War
- Fritz Erler (1868–1940), German artist, born in Frankenstein
- Wilhelm Kroll (1869–1939), German classic philologist
- Günther Specht (1914–1945), Luftwaffe pilot
- Horst Hannig (1921–1943), Luftwaffe pilot
- Wiesław Kilian (1952–2019), Polish politician
- Ewa Sonnenberg (born 1967), Polish poet, pianist and essayist
- Marcin Gwóźdź (born 1977), Polish politician and engineer
- Piotr Zieliński (born 1994), Polish football player

== Twin towns – sister cities ==
See twin towns of Gmina Ząbkowice Śląskie.
