= Szklary, Ząbkowice County =

Szklary
- Village
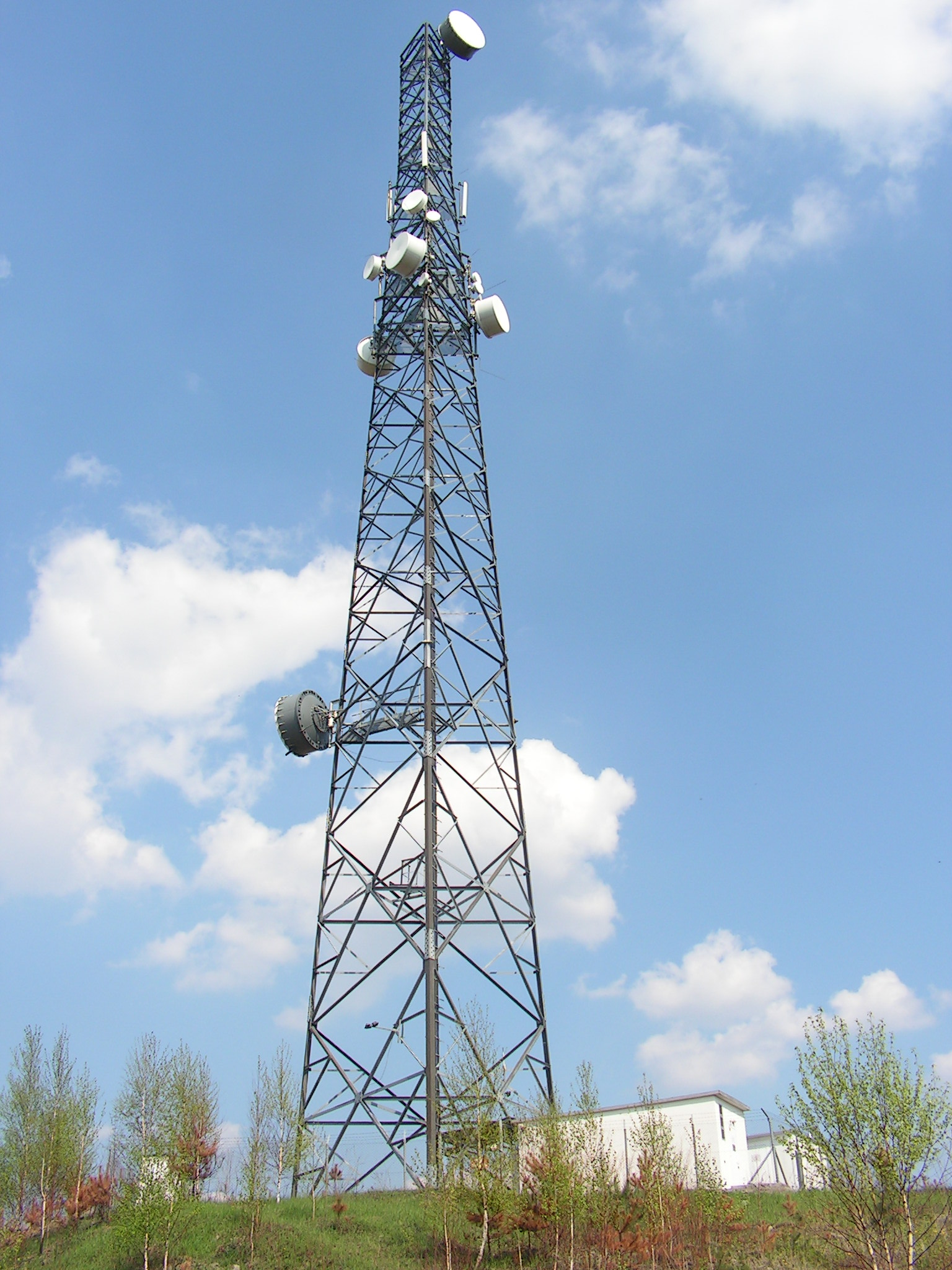

- Location within Poland
- Coordinates: 50°39′N 16°50′E
- Country: Poland
- Voivodeship: Lower Silesian
- County: Ząbkowice
- Gmina: Ząbkowice Śląskie
- Time zone: UTC+1 (CET)
  - Summer (DST): UTC+2 (CEST)
- Vehicle registration: DZA

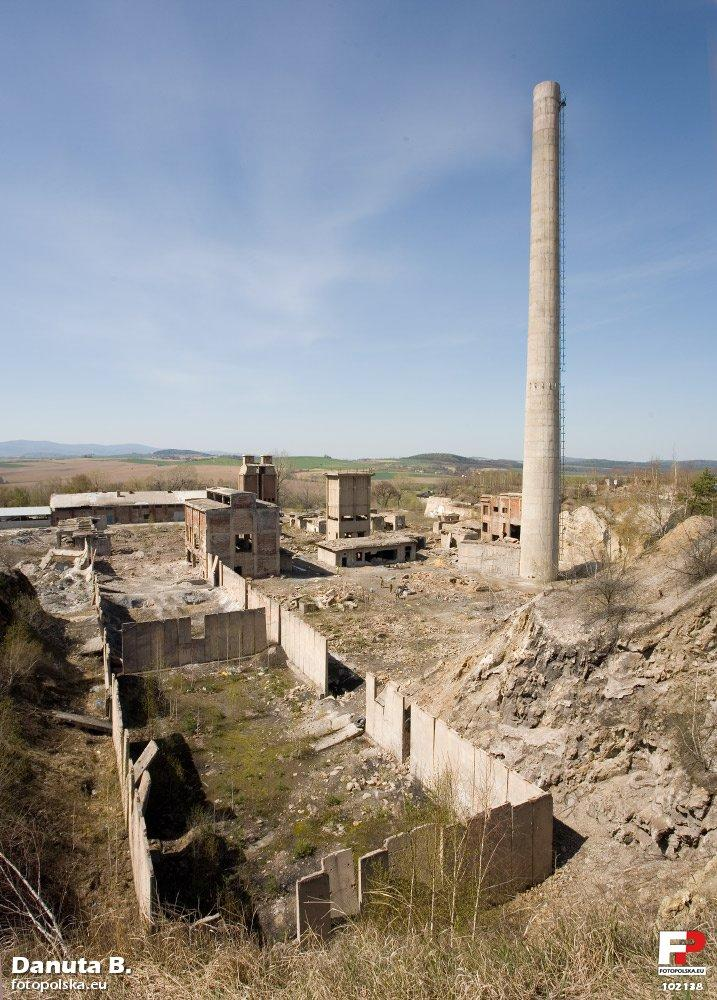
Szklary-Huta

Szklary [ˈʂklarɨ] is a village in the administrative district of Gmina Ząbkowice Śląskie, within Ząbkowice County, Lower Silesian Voivodeship, in south-western Poland.

The only nickel ore mine in Poland was located here until 1984 when it was closed due to the depletion of the deposits. There was also a nickel foundry for processing mined ore. Excellent samples of chrysoprase were found in Szklary. Quite recently, a new mineral szklaryite was named after the village.

During World War I, the German administration operated a forced labour camp for Allied prisoners of war at the local nickel ore mine.
