= Dumortierite =

Aluminum boro-silicate mineral

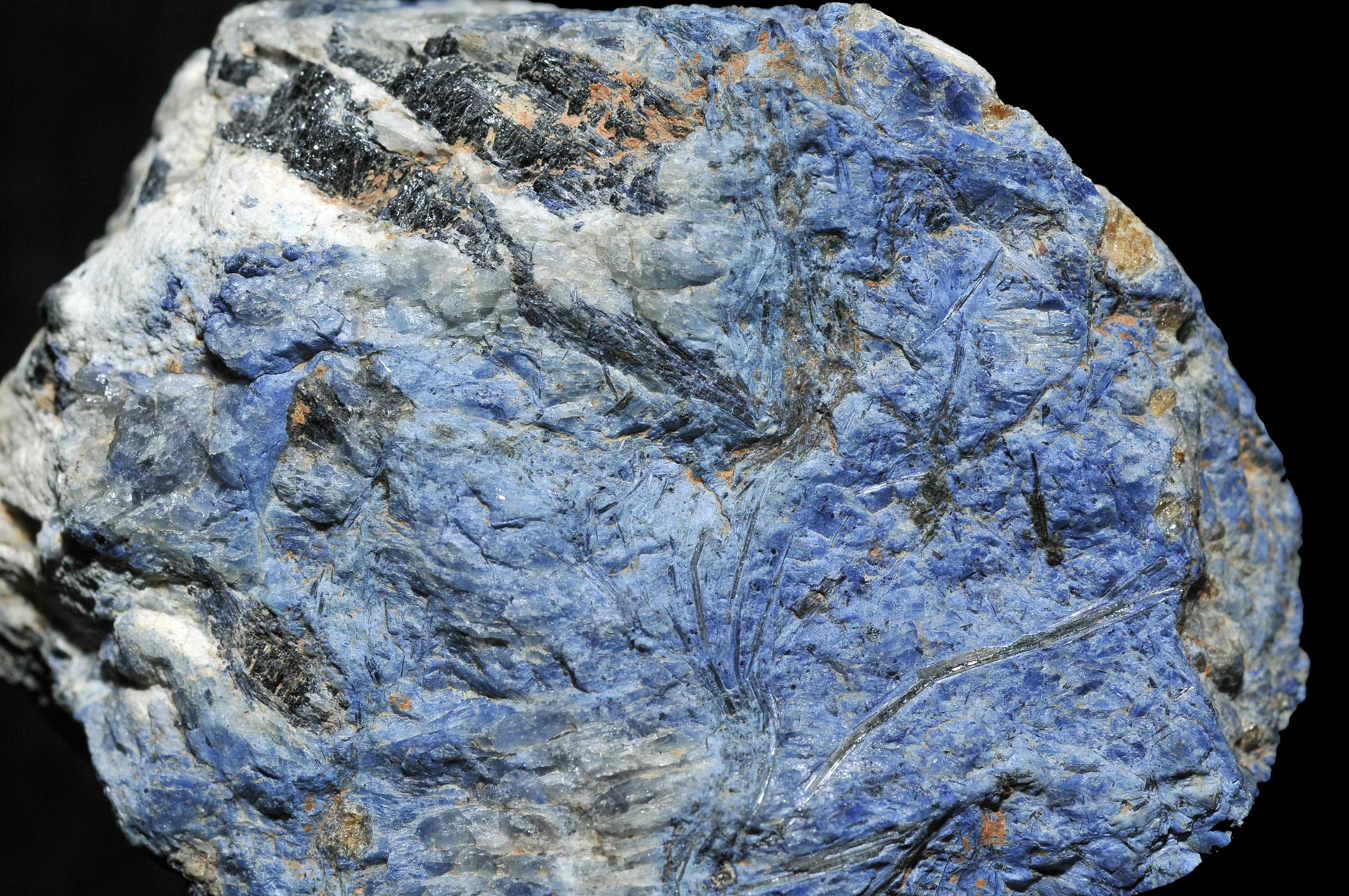
- Dumortierite from Tuléar Province (Toliara), Madagascar

General
- Category: Nesosilicate
- Formula: Al_{7}BO_{3}(SiO_{4})_{3}O_{3} or Al_{6.5-7}BO_{3}(SiO_{4})_{3}(O,OH)_{3}
- IMA symbol: Dum
- Strunz classification: 9.AJ.10
- Crystal system: Orthorhombic
- Crystal class: Dipyramidal (mmm); H-M symbol: (2/m 2/m 2/m)
- Space group: Pmcn (no. 62)
- Unit cell: a = 11.77 Å, b = 20.21 Å c = 4.71 Å; Z = 4

Identification
- Color: Blue, greenish-blue, violet-blue, pale blue, red
- Crystal habit: As fibrous or columnar crystals; coarsely crystalline to intimate parallel aggregates of needles; massive
- Twinning: Common on {110}, may produce trillings
- Cleavage: Distinct on {100}, poor on {110}; parting on {001}
- Fracture: Fibrous
- Mohs scale hardness: 7–8.5
- Luster: Vitreous to dull
- Streak: White
- Diaphaneity: Transparent to translucent
- Specific gravity: 3.3–3.4
- Optical properties: Biaxial (−)
- Refractive index: n_{α} = 1.659 – 1.678 n_{β} = 1.684 – 1.691 n_{γ} = 1.686 – 1.692
- Birefringence: δ = 0.027
- Pleochroism: Strong; X = deep blue or violet; Y = yellow to red-violet or nearly colorless; Z = colorless or very pale blue
- 2V angle: Measured: 20° to 52°, calculated: 30°
- Dispersion: r > v; strong

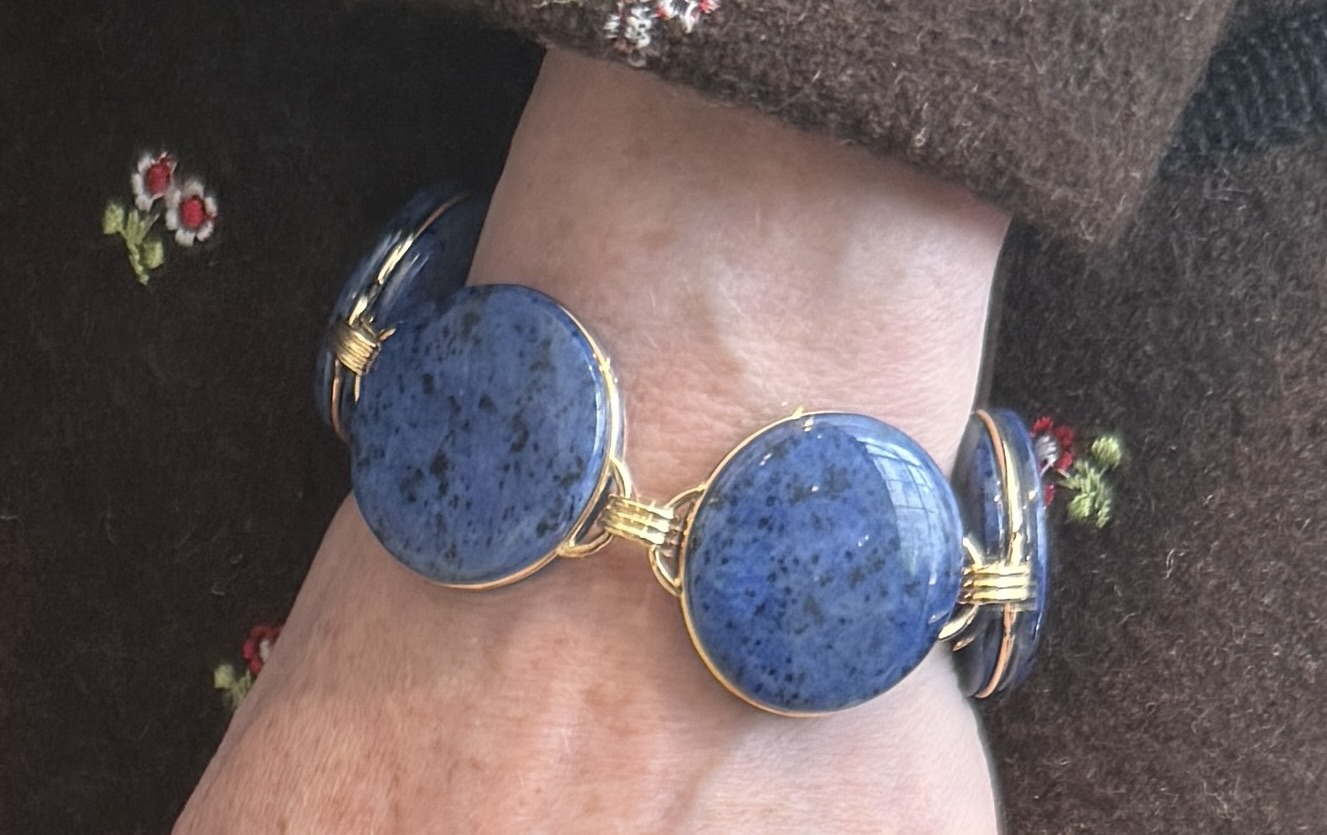
Spectacle bracelet in dumortierite and gold by Cora Sheibani

Dumortierite is a fibrous variably colored aluminium boro-silicate mineral, Al_{7}BO_{3}(SiO_{4})_{3}O_{3}. It crystallizes in the orthorhombic system typically forming fibrous aggregates of slender prismatic crystals. The crystals are vitreous and vary in color from brown, blue, and green to more rare violet and pink. Substitution of iron and other tri-valent elements for aluminium results in the color variations. It has a Mohs hardness of 7 and a specific gravity of 3.3 to 3.4. Crystals show pleochroism from red to blue to violet. Dumortierite quartz is blue colored crystal containing abundant dumortierite inclusions. Although sometimes called a quartz, Dumortierite is not truly a quartz.

Dumortierite was first described in 1881 for an occurrence in Chaponost, in the Rhône-Alps of France and named for the French paleontologist Eugène Dumortier (1803–1873). It typically occurs in high temperature aluminium rich regional metamorphic rocks, those resulting from contact metamorphism and also in boron rich pegmatites. The most extensive investigation on dumortierite was done on samples from the high grade metamorphic Gfohl unit in Austria by Fuchs et al. (2005).

It is used in the manufacture of high grade porcelain. It is sometimes mistaken for sodalite and has been used as imitation lapis lazuli.

Sources of dumortierite include Austria, Brazil, Canada, France, Italy, Madagascar, Namibia, Nevada, Norway, Peru, Poland, Russia, Indonesia, and Sri Lanka.

== See also ==
- List of minerals
- List of minerals named after people
