= Basilica of the Assumption of the Blessed Virgin Mary, Krzeszów =

Basilica of the Assumption of the Blessed Virgin Mary in Krzeszów
- Bazylika Wniebowzięcia Najświętszej Maryi Panny w Krzeszowie
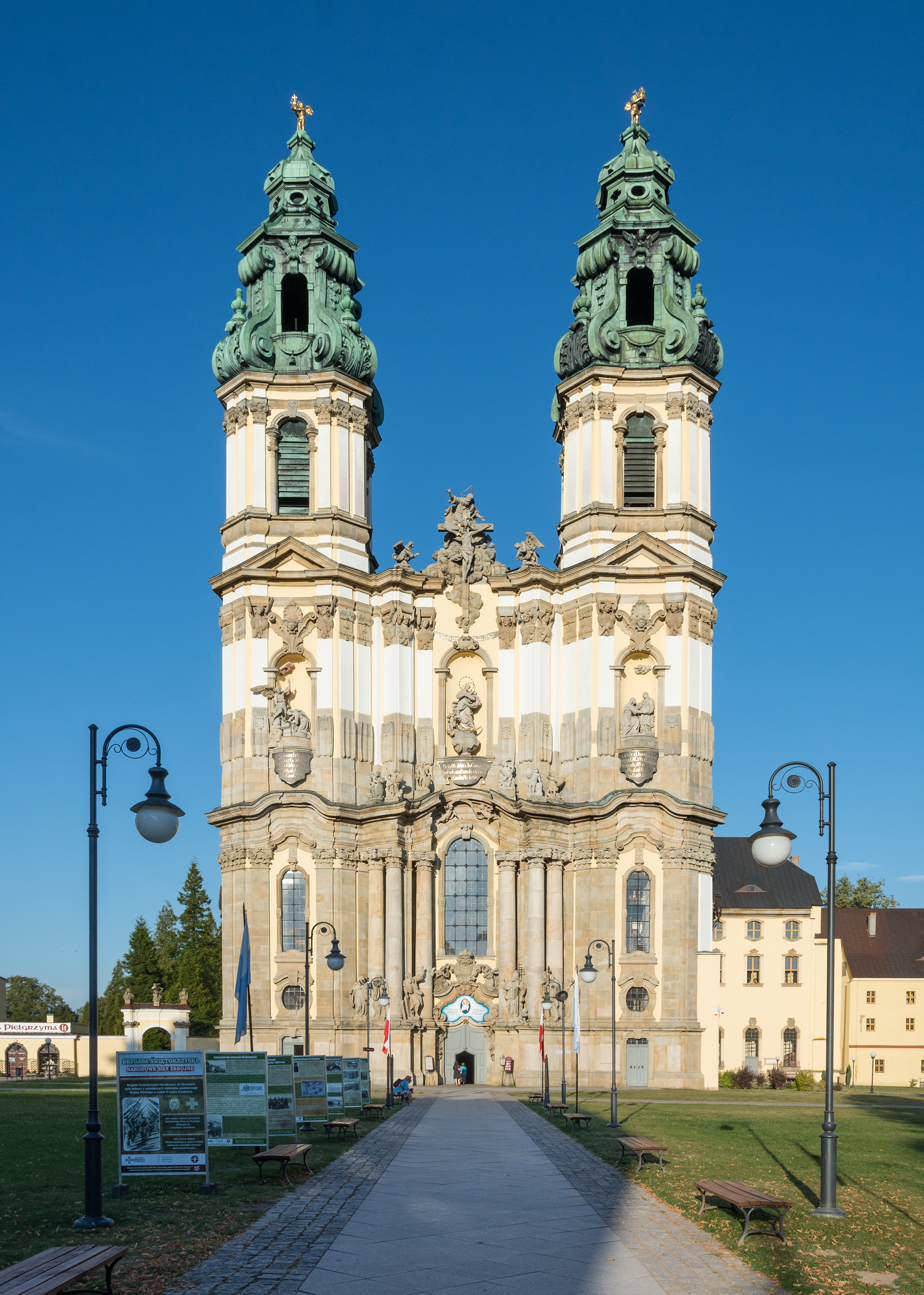

- 50°43′59″N 16°04′07″E
- Location: Krzeszów
- Country: Poland
- Language: Polish
- Denomination: Catholic

History
- Status: Basilica minor
- Dedication: Assumption of Mary

Architecture
- Functional status: Active
- Heritage designation: Historic Monument of Poland
- Designated: 14 April 2004
- Style: Baroque
- Years built: 1728–1735

Administration
- Diocese: Legnica
- Deanery: Kamienna Góra Wschód
- Parish: Assumption of Mary Parish in Krzeszów

Historic Monument of Poland
- Designated: 2004-04-14
- Part of: Krzeszów – Cistercian Abbey
- Reference no.: Dz. U. z 2004 r. Nr 102, poz. 1057

Basilica of the Assumption of the Blessed Virgin Mary in Krzeszów (Polish: Bazylika Wniebowzięcia NMP w Krzeszowie) is a Roman Catholic church located within the abbey of the Order of Saint Benedict in Krzeszów, Poland. Built in 1728–1735, it is a notable Baroque church in Lower Silesia and a shrine to the Virgin Mary, listed as a Historic Monument of Poland. It is a basilica since 1998.

== Interior ==
The church contains the icon of Our Lady, Mother of Grace from the late 12th or early 13th century, and is one of Poland's shrines to the Virgin Mary. The icon is the oldest icon of Mary in Poland, and one of the five oldest icons of Mary in Europe.

In one of the chapels there is a mausoleum of dukes of the Świdnica line of the Polish Piast dynasty: Bolko I the Strict and Bolko II the Small.

The church also contains Baroque sculptures by Ferdinand Brokoff and paintings by Michael Willmann.

== Gallery ==
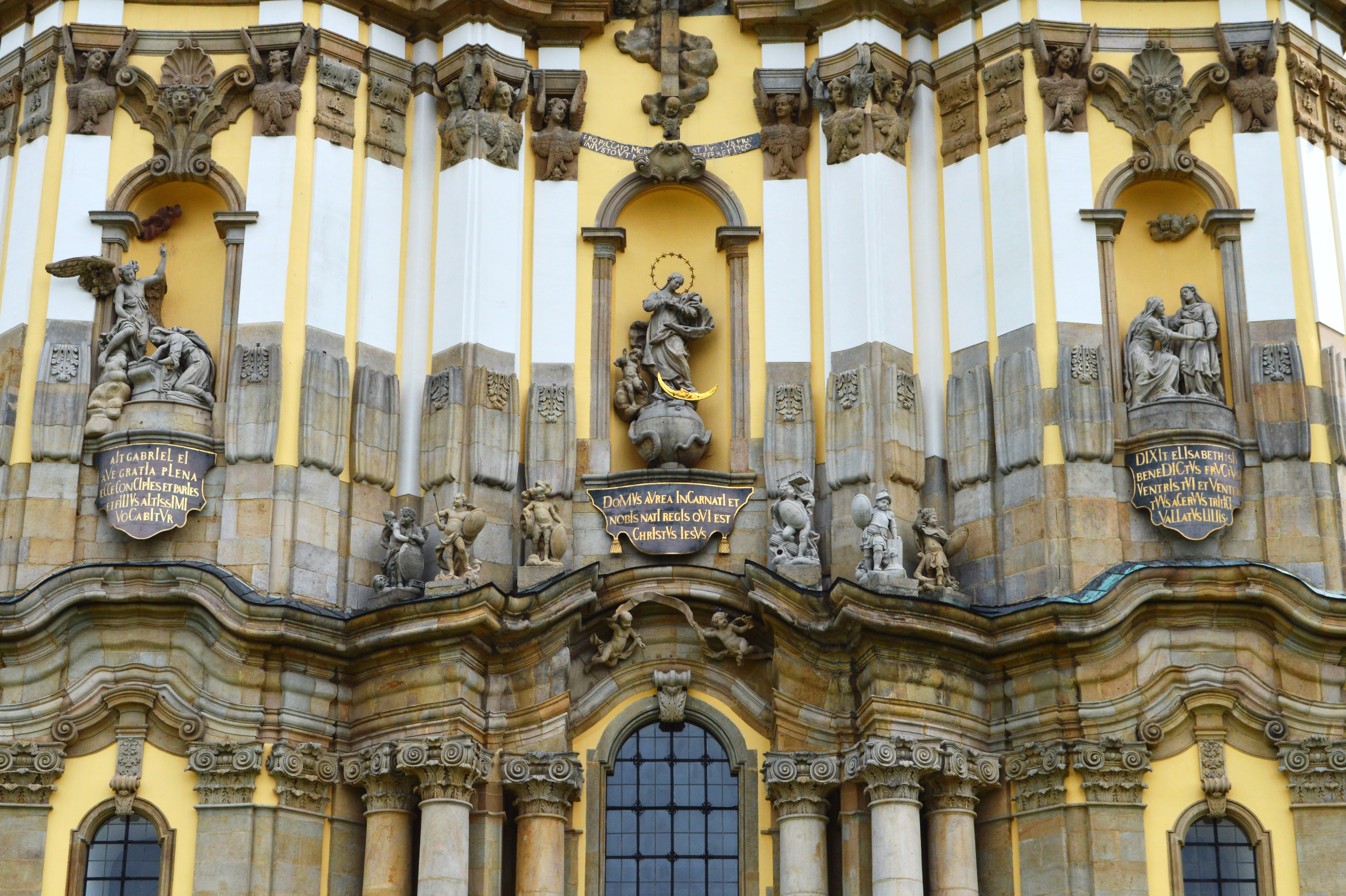
Façade

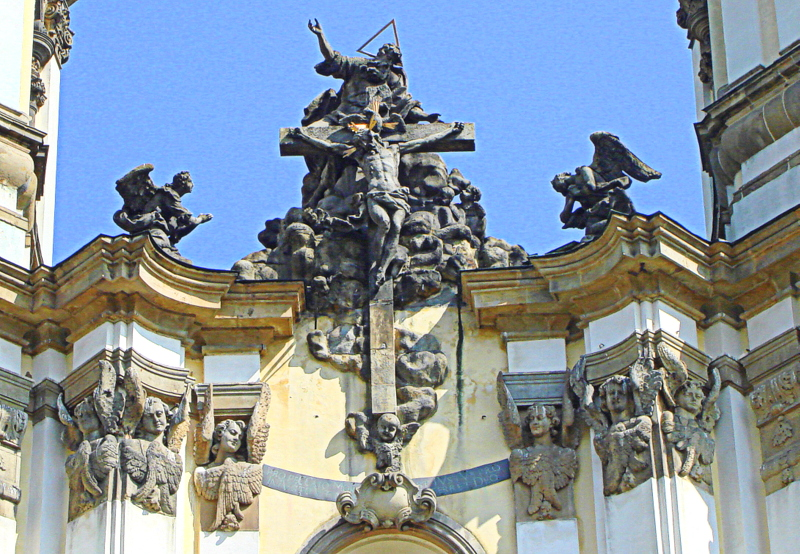
Throne of Grace crowning the façade

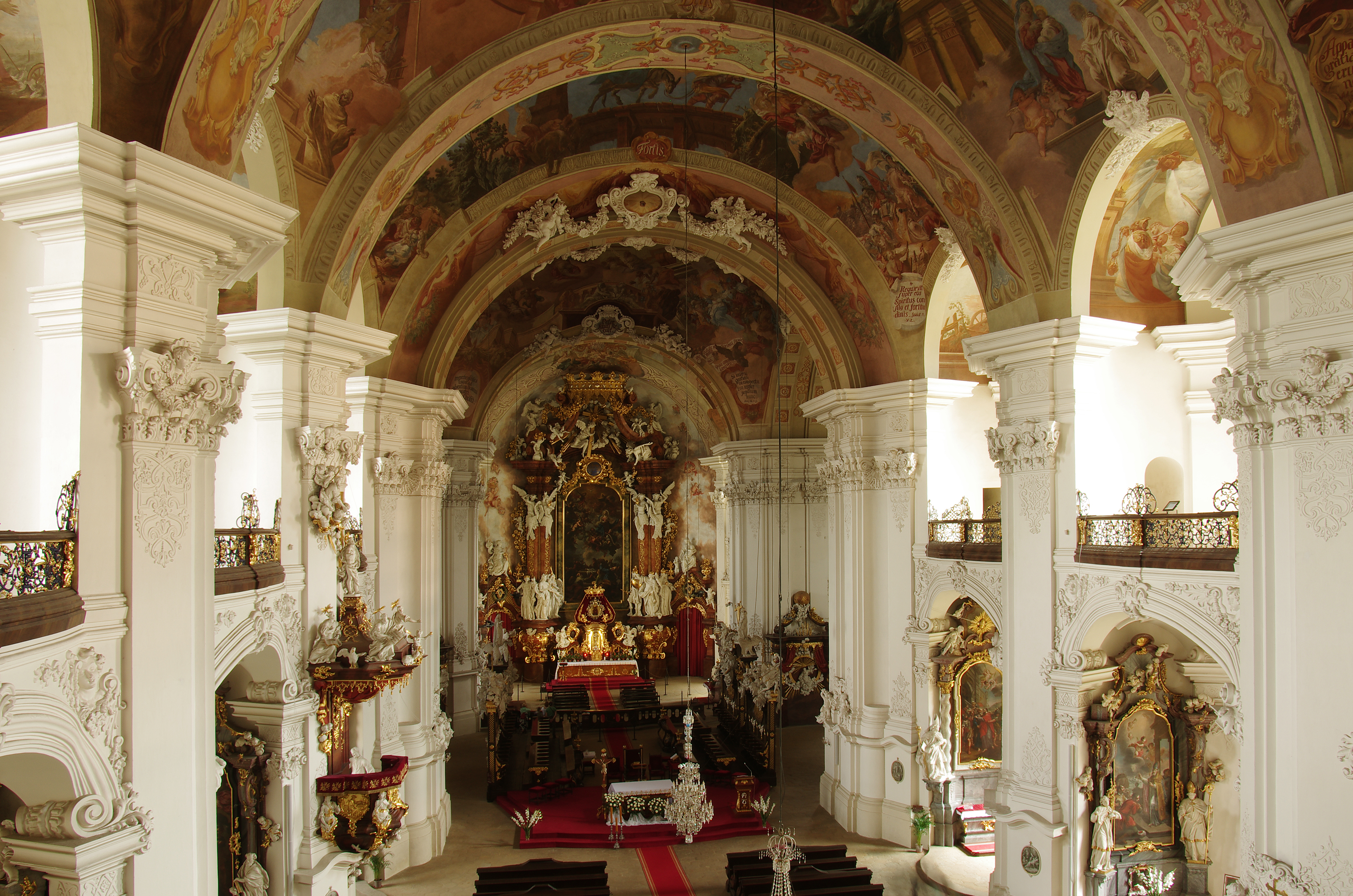
Interior

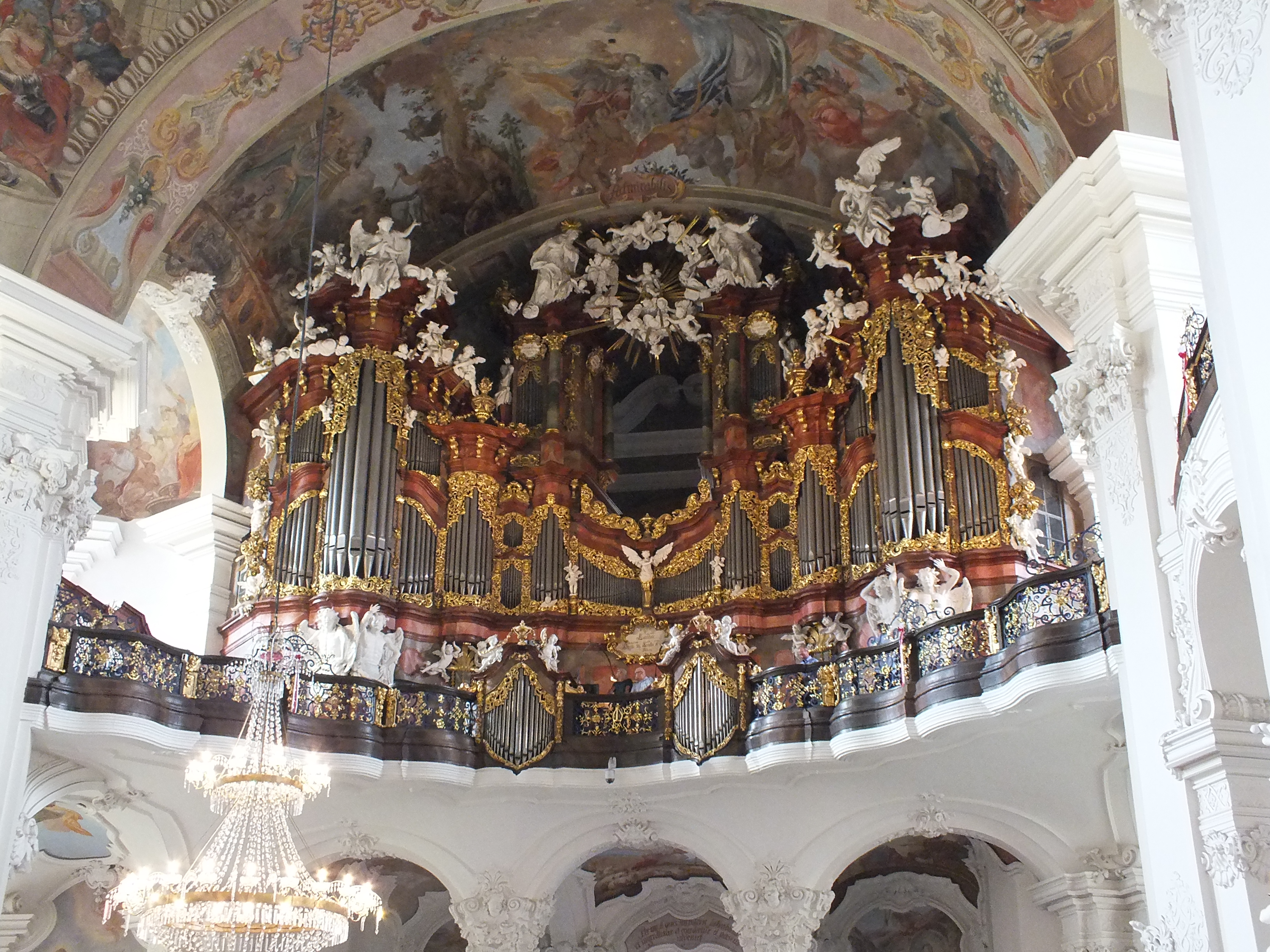
Pipe organs

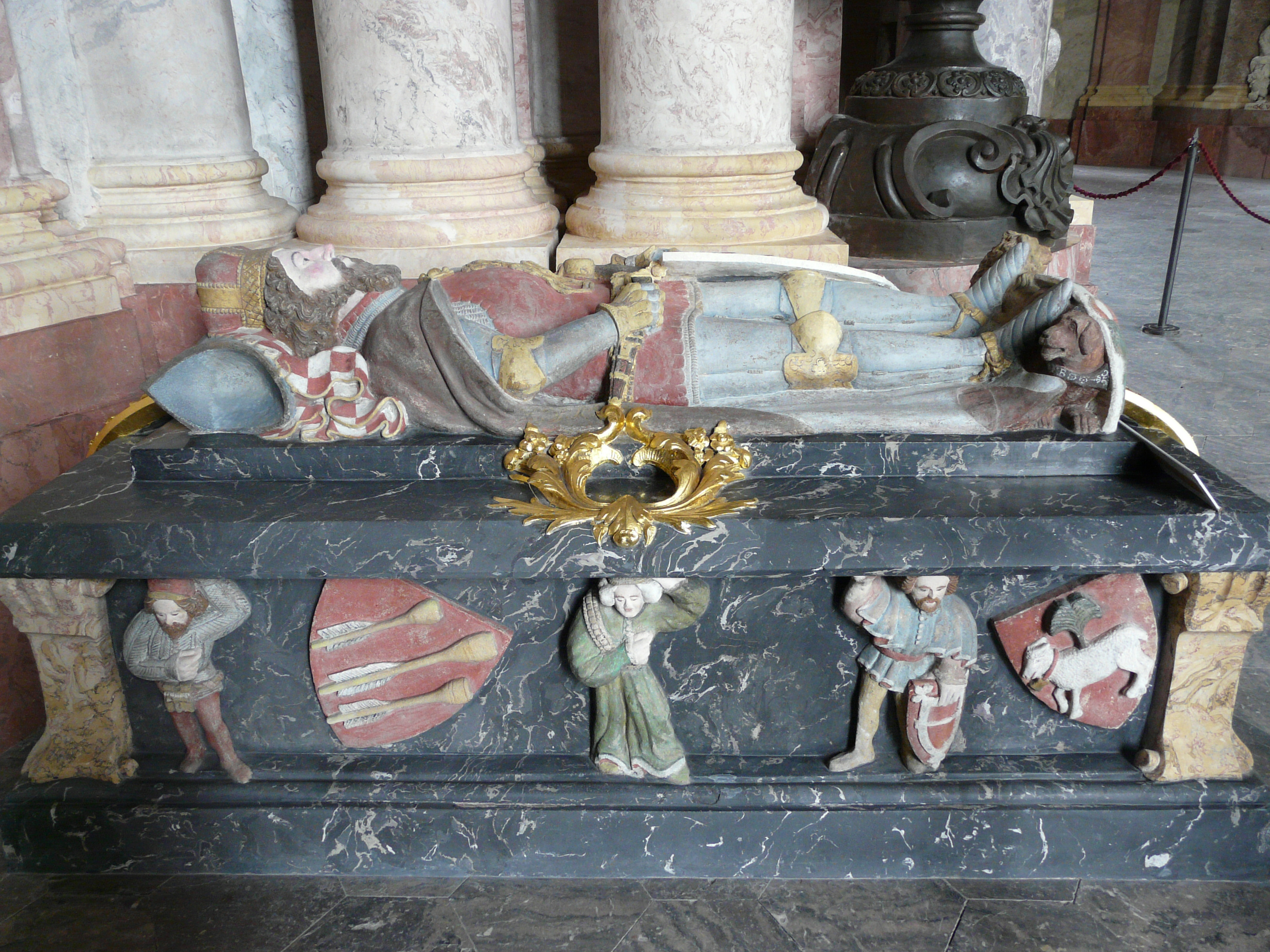
Tomb of Duke Bolko II the Small

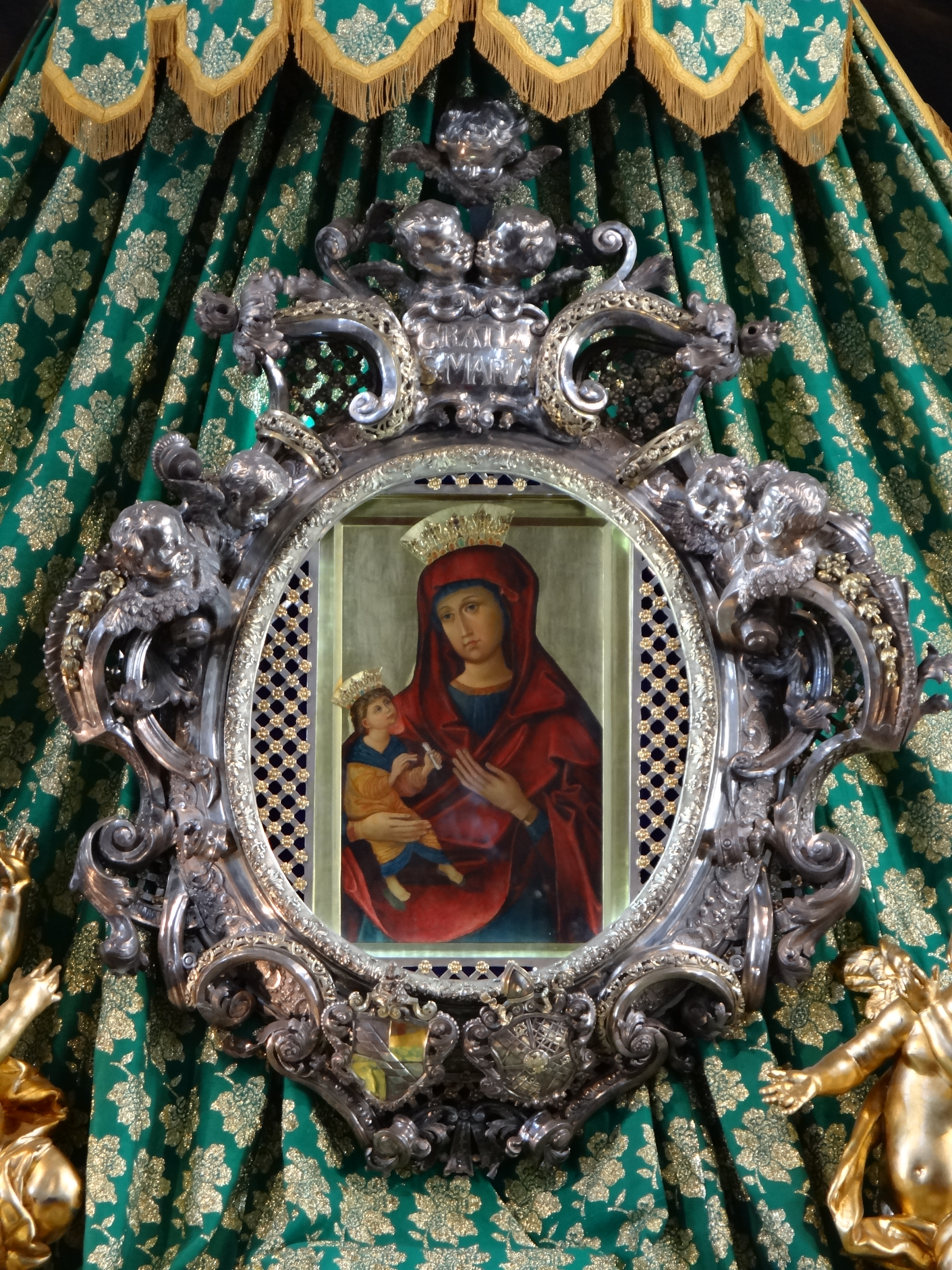
Icon of Our Lady, Mother of Grace

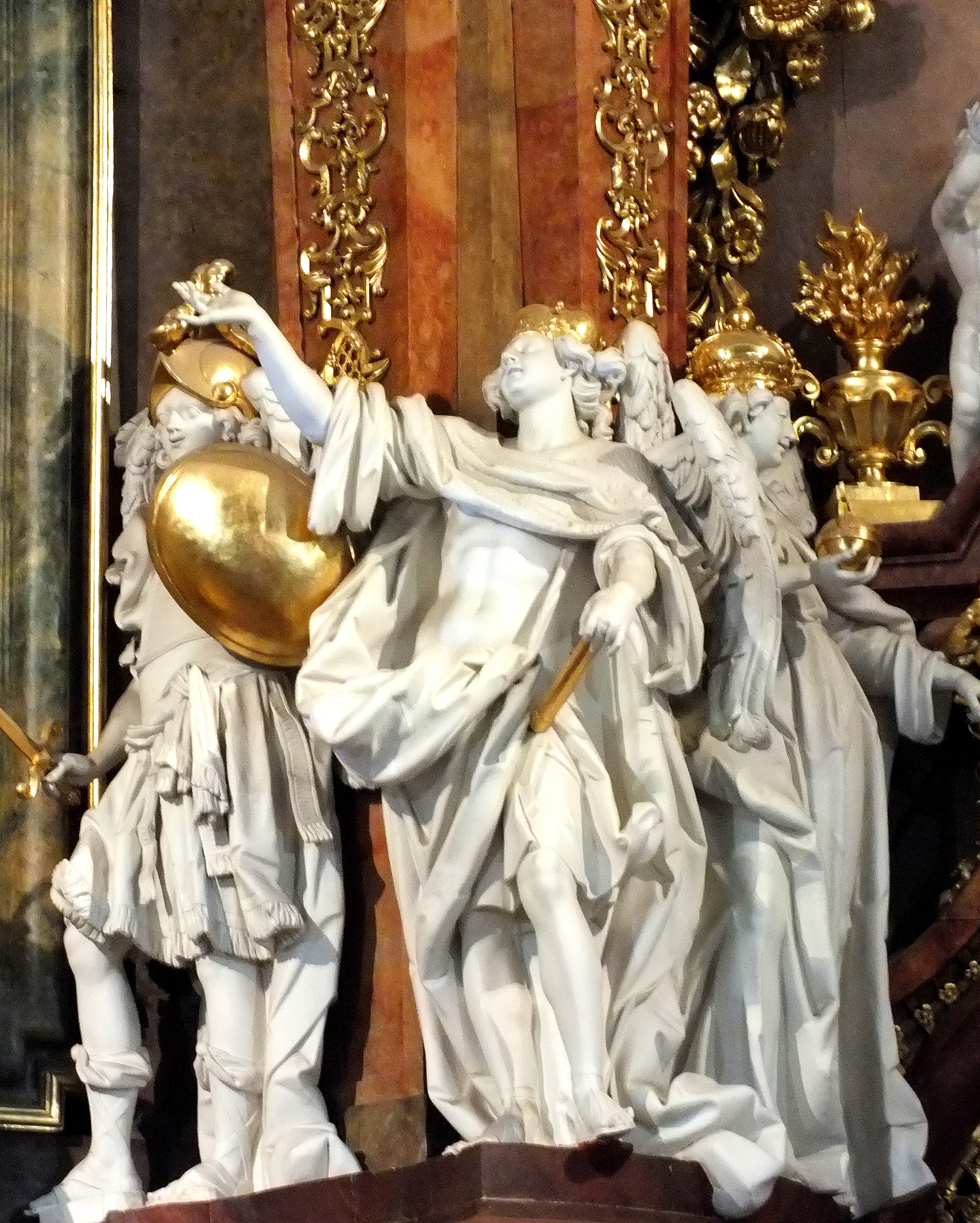
Baroque sculptures of angels, main altar
