= Krzeszów, Lower Silesian Voivodeship =

Krzeszów
- Village
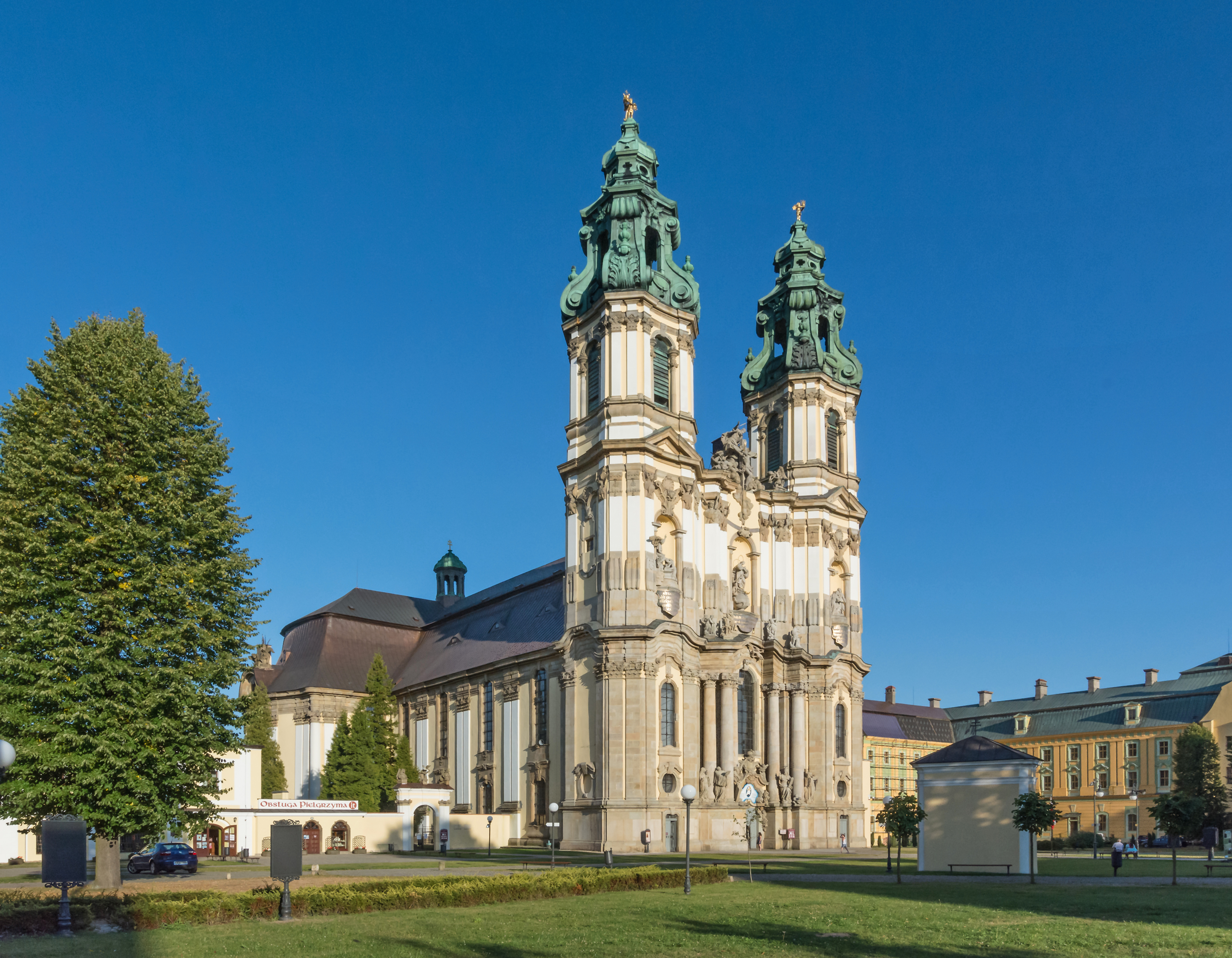
- Krzeszów Abbey

- Location within Poland
- Coordinates: 50°44′03″N 16°03′51″E
- Country: Poland
- Voivodeship: Lower Silesian
- County: Kamienna Góra
- Gmina: Kamienna Góra

Population
  - Total: 1,400
- Time zone: UTC+1 (CET)
  - Summer (DST): UTC+2 (CEST)
- Vehicle registration: DKA

Historic Monument of Poland
- Official name: Krzeszów – Cistercian Abbey
- Designated: 2004-04-14
- Reference no.: Dz. U., 2004, vol. 102, No. 1057

Krzeszów [ˈkʂɛʂuf] is a village in south-western Poland. It is part of the administrative district of Kamienna Góra County, Lower Silesian Voivodeship. Krzeszów boasts the Krzeszów Abbey, one of the most valuable relics of Baroque architecture in Poland and Europe, designated a Historic Monument of Poland.

The village is located in the Zadrna valley of the Central Sudetes, within the historic Lower Silesia region.

== History ==
The area became part of the emerging Polish state in the 10th century. Following the fragmentation of Poland into smaller duchies, it formed part of the duchies of Silesia and Świdnica. The Benedictine abbey of Grissobor was established on 8 May 1242 by Anne of Bohemia, widow of Polish monarch Henry II the Pious, who had been killed at the Battle of Legnica during the first Mongol invasion of Poland. It was located on the rim of the Silesian Przesieka, probably at neighbouring Krzeszówek. At first a filial of the Bohemian Opatovice monastery, the estates were acquired by the Silesian duke Bolko I the Strict of Świdnica–Jawor in 1292, himself a grandson of late Duke Henry II, who brought Cistercian monks from nearby Henryków and endowed them with suitable assets at Krzeszów.

The 14th century was marked as a period of impressive development and vast influence of Krzeszów Abbey. Its estates comprised about 40 villages and the towns of Lubawka and Chełmsko. Meanwhile, upon the death of Duke Bolko II the Small in 1368, the time of the Świdnica–Jawor Piast line's extinction started its decline. The duchy was inherited by the Bohemian Crown and during the Hussite invasions and again during the Thirty Years' War, the abbey was totally destroyed and plundered. However, after the 1648 Peace of Westphalia, a new prosperous period for the abbey began.

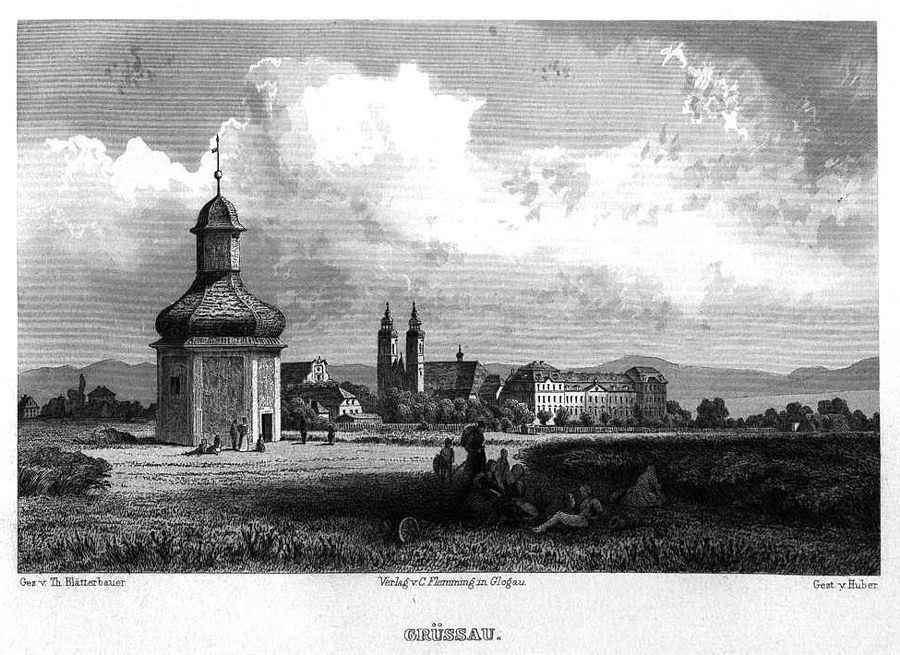
19th-century depiction

Upon the First Silesian War, Krzeszów, under its Germanized name Grüssau, was annexed by Prussia in 1742. In 1810 the estates were secularised and from 1815 were part of the Silesia Province. In 1945 it was conquered by the Red Army in the course of the Vistula–Oder Offensive, upon the Potsdam Agreement, Krzeszów became again part of Poland, although with a Soviet-installed communist regime, which stayed in power until the 1980s and the remaining German population was expelled. Krzeszów was repopulated by Poles expelled from Wiśniowce, Dolina and Majdan in pre-war south-eastern Poland annexed by the Soviet Union.

The abbey was resettled with Benedictine nuns, themselves expelled from Lwów (now Lviv) in former Polish Kresy, annexed by the Soviet Union. The buildings include the Basilica of the Assumption of the Blessed Virgin Mary, the mausoleum of the Świdnica-Jawor Piasts, the Church of St. Joseph, the abbey buildings, a guest house called the 'House of the Abbot', numerous calvary chapels and household buildings.

From 1975 to 1998, Krzeszów was administratively located in the Jelenia Góra Voivodeship.
