= Krzeszów Abbey =

Monastery in Lower Silesia, Poland

Krzeszów Abbey National Heritage of Poland
- Opactwo Cysterskie w Krzeszowie (Polish)
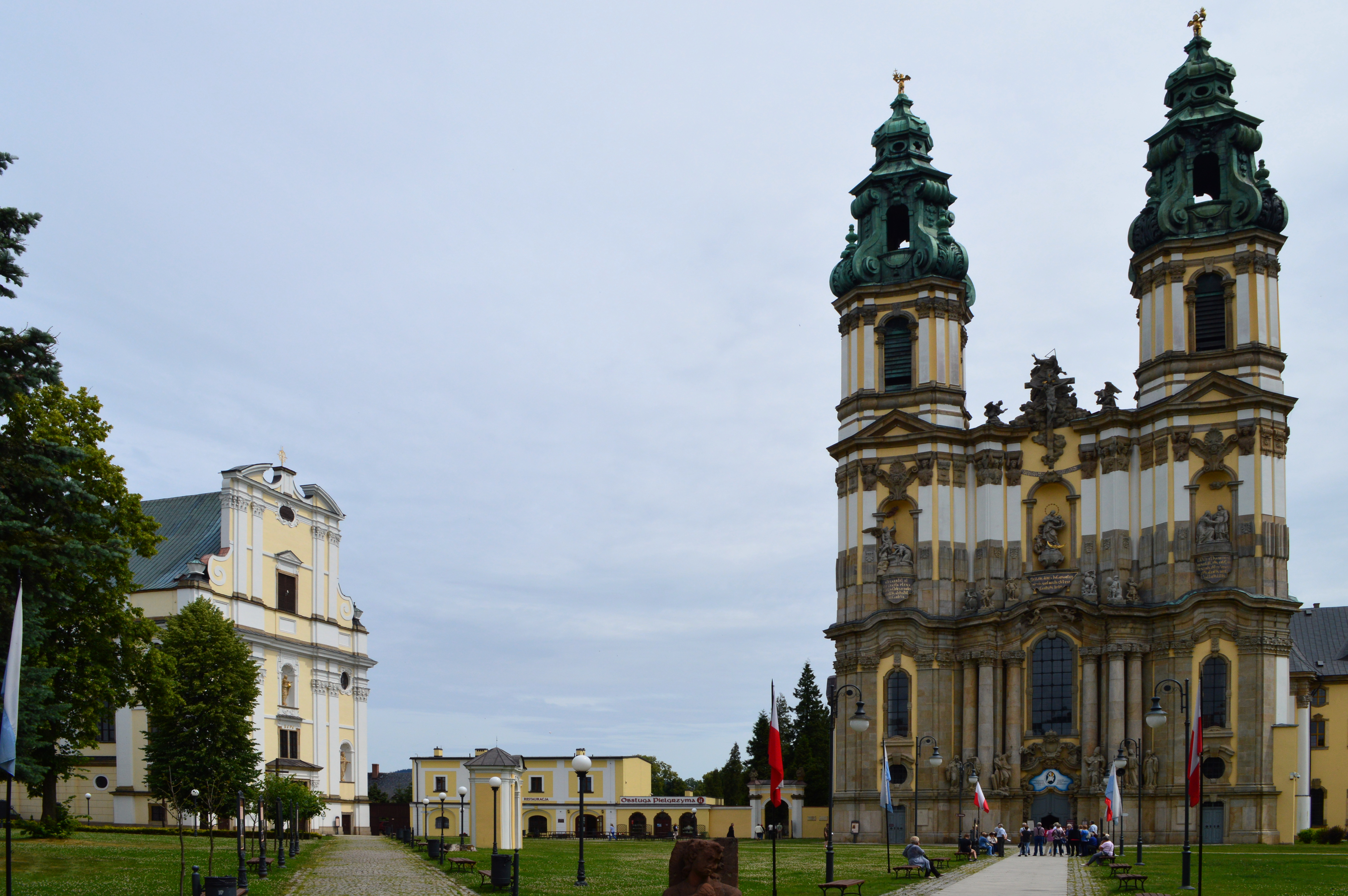
- Churches of the Krzeszów Abbey

- Location of Krzeszów Abbey in Poland
- 50°44′04″N 16°04′20″E
- Location: Krzeszów, Poland

Site notes
- Area: Europe
- Architectural style: Baroque

Historic Monument of Poland
- Designated: 2004-04-14
- Reference no.: Dz. U. z 2004 r. Nr 102, poz. 1057

Krzeszów Abbey (Polish: Klasztor w Krzeszowie, German: Kloster Grüssau) is a historical Baroque Cistercian monastery in Krzeszów, Lower Silesia, Poland.

The Abbey, a 1242 Benedictine foundation, from 1289 to 1810 was run by Cistercians, until it was secularized by the Prussian state. Since 1919, it was again run by Benedictines, exiles from Prague. The new location in post-war West Germany was referred to as Grüssau Abbey or Grüssau-Wimpfen. The site of the abbey in Krzeszów, Poland, is known as Krzeszów Abbey. The abbey's Basilica of the Assumption contains a mausoleum of dukes of the Świdnica line of the Polish Piast dynasty.

The name Grüssau Abbey refers to a house of the Benedictine Order founded in 1947 in the town of Bad Wimpfen in Baden-Württemberg, where the German Grüssau (Krzeszów) community moved, after Krzeszów became again part of Poland following World War II.

The original abbey is now one of Poland's official national Historic Monuments (Pomnik historii), as designated May 1, 2004, and tracked by the National Heritage Board of Poland.

== History ==
=== Silesia ===
On 8 May 1242, the monastery at Krzeszów in Lower Silesia in fragmented Poland was founded by Duchess Anna of Bohemia, widow of the High Duke of Poland Henry II the Pious, who had been killed at the Battle of Legnica during the first Mongol invasion of Poland. It was settled with Benedictine monks descending from the abbey of Opatovice in Bohemia. In 1289 Anna's grandson Duke Bolko I of Świdnica again acquired the abbey's lands and gave them to the Cistercians at Henryków, who consecrated the new Assumption of Mary Monastery Church in 1292. In 1392 the Silesian Duchy of Świdnica was incorporated into the Kingdom of Bohemia, an electorate of the Holy Roman Empire.

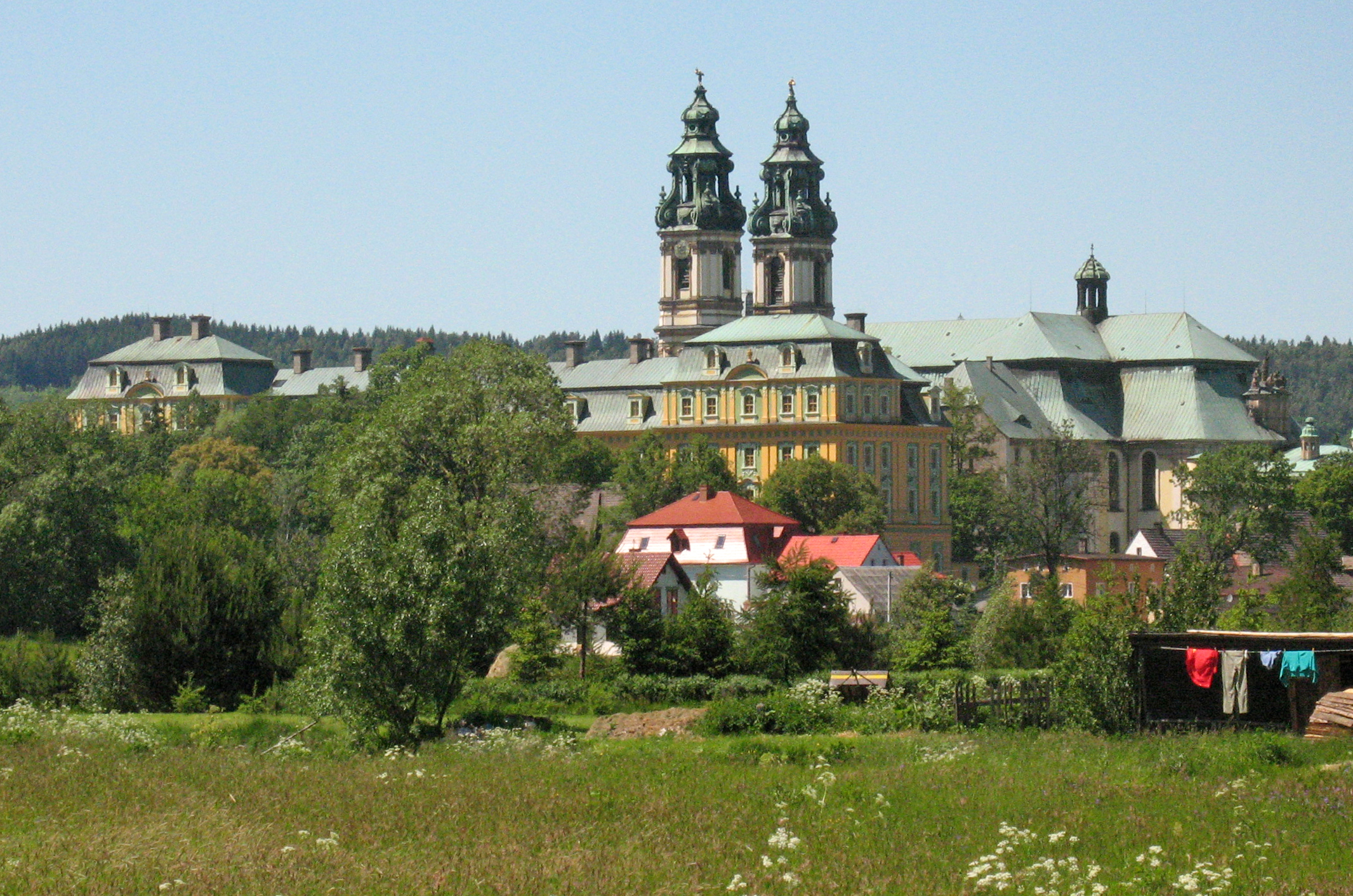
Krzeszów Abbey

The Abbey was destroyed during the Hussite Wars and again during the Thirty Years' War, and rebuilt on both occasions. It was particularly connected with the Silesian mystic Angelus Silesius. From 1728 on the abbey church was rebuilt in a Baroque style, including several sculptures by Ferdinand Brokoff as well as paintings by Petr Brandl and Michael Willmann. With most of Silesia, Grüssau was conquered by King Frederick II of Prussia in 1742 and finally secularised in 1810 during the Napoleonic Wars. The church became a parish church and the remaining premises were used for various governmental purposes within the Prussian Province of Silesia.

After World War I, when the German monks of the Emmaus Abbey in Prague, Czechoslovakia were obliged to leave the city, they resettled in 1919 in the empty monastery buildings at Grüssau, then part of Weimar Germany. It was again raised to an abbey by Pope Pius XI in 1924, the monastery was however suspended by the Nazi government in 1940 and the buildings seized as a detention camp. During the bombing of Berlin from 1942 on, large parts of the Berlin State Library collection were outhoused at the abbey. Those documents include some of the earliest known species illustrations by European naturalists including, among others, Georg Marcgrave (Marcgraf) and botanist Ferdinand Bauer. This collection was stored at the abbey during World War II, and remained missing for over 30 years.

The territory became part of Poland according to the 1945 Potsdam Agreement. Although the monastery was returned to the monks after the end of World War II, as ethnic Germans they were expelled in accordance to the Potsdam Agreement by the Soviet-installed Polish communist government shortly afterwards on 12 May 1946. In 1946 a mysterious convoy called at the monastery and loaded thousands of manuscripts — autographed scores of Mozart (¼ of his known music), Beethoven, Bach and other composers — and disappeared. Several volumes were restored to East Germany in 1965, the remaining Berlinka collection at the Cracow Jagiellonian University and its status as "looted art" is still a matter of dispute.

In 1947 Krzeszów Abbey was resettled by Polish Benedictine nuns expelled from Lviv (Lwów) in pre-war eastern Poland annexed by the Soviet Union.

=== Baden-Württemberg ===
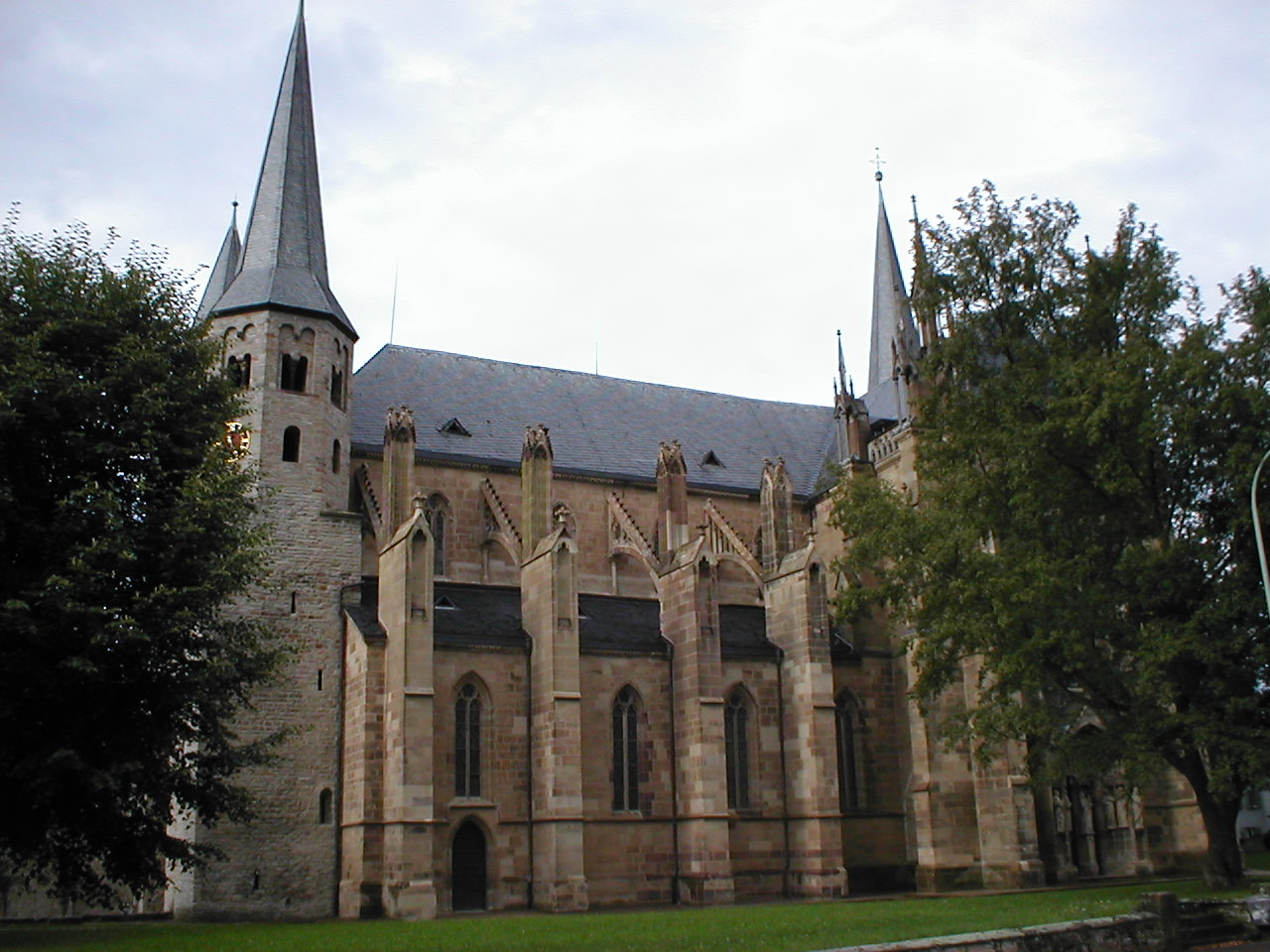
St Peter's Abbey Church in Bad Wimpfen

In 1947 the expelled community under Abbot Albert Schmitt purchased the former Ritterstift (collegiate foundation or canonry) around the Gothic monastery church of Saint Peter in Bad Wimpfen, that had been abandoned since its secularisation in 1803, and became known as Kloster Bad Wimpfen. The last abbot, Laurentius Hoheisel, resigned in 1997. As the membership of the community had declined too far for it to be legally independent, it has been directed since 2001 by the abbot of Neuburg Abbey near Heidelberg.

By the autumn of 2006 no monks remained, the last having moved to Neuburg, although Kloster Bad Wimpfen still remains nominally a Benedictine monastery and is still a member of the Beuron Congregation within the Benedictine Confederation. A small community (consisting at the end of 2006 of a priest and a layman) maintain the facilities as a Benedictine guest house and venue for retreats, under the management of Neuburg Abbey.

== Gallery ==
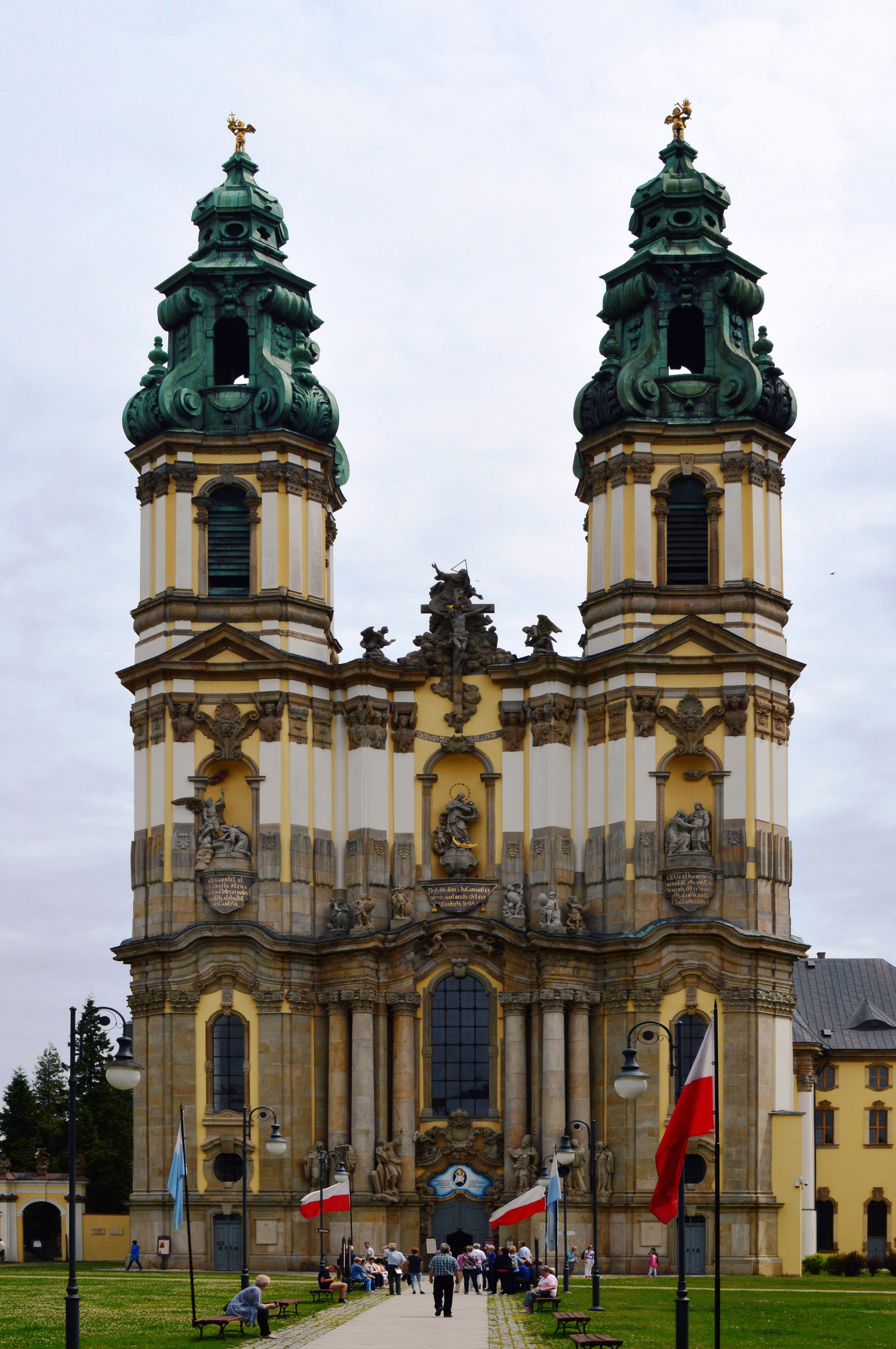
Basilica of the Assumption

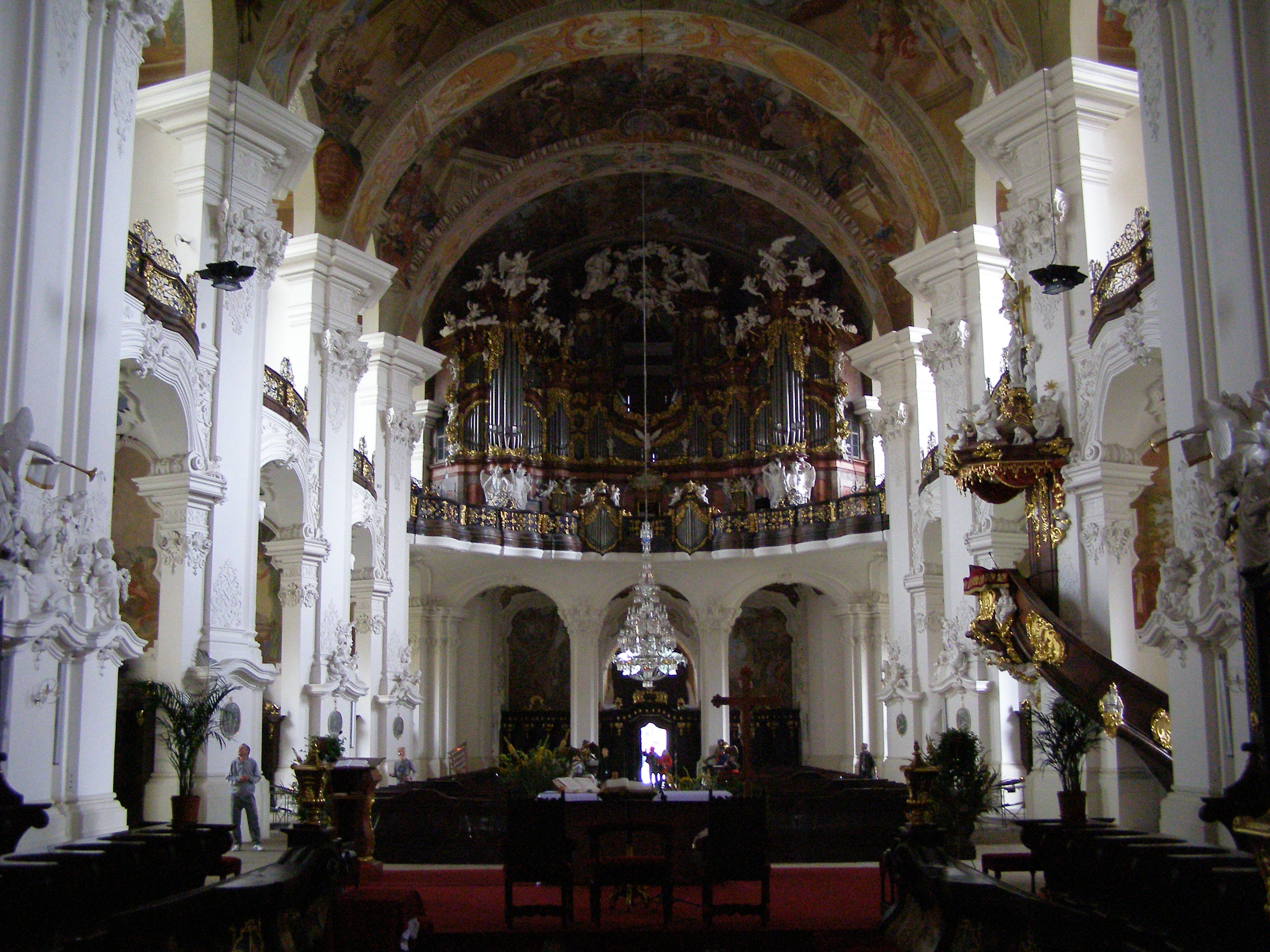
Basilica interior

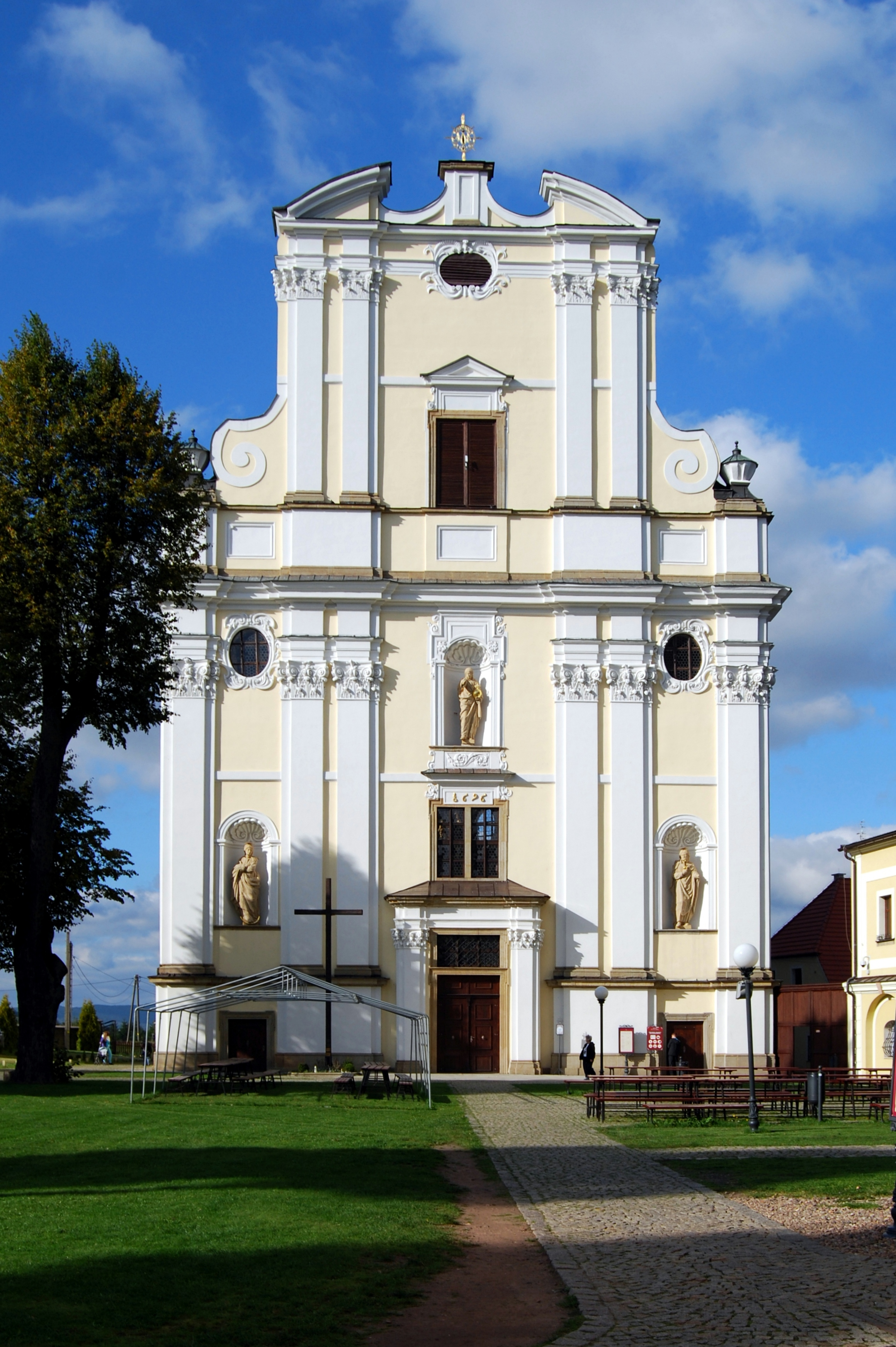
Saint Joseph church

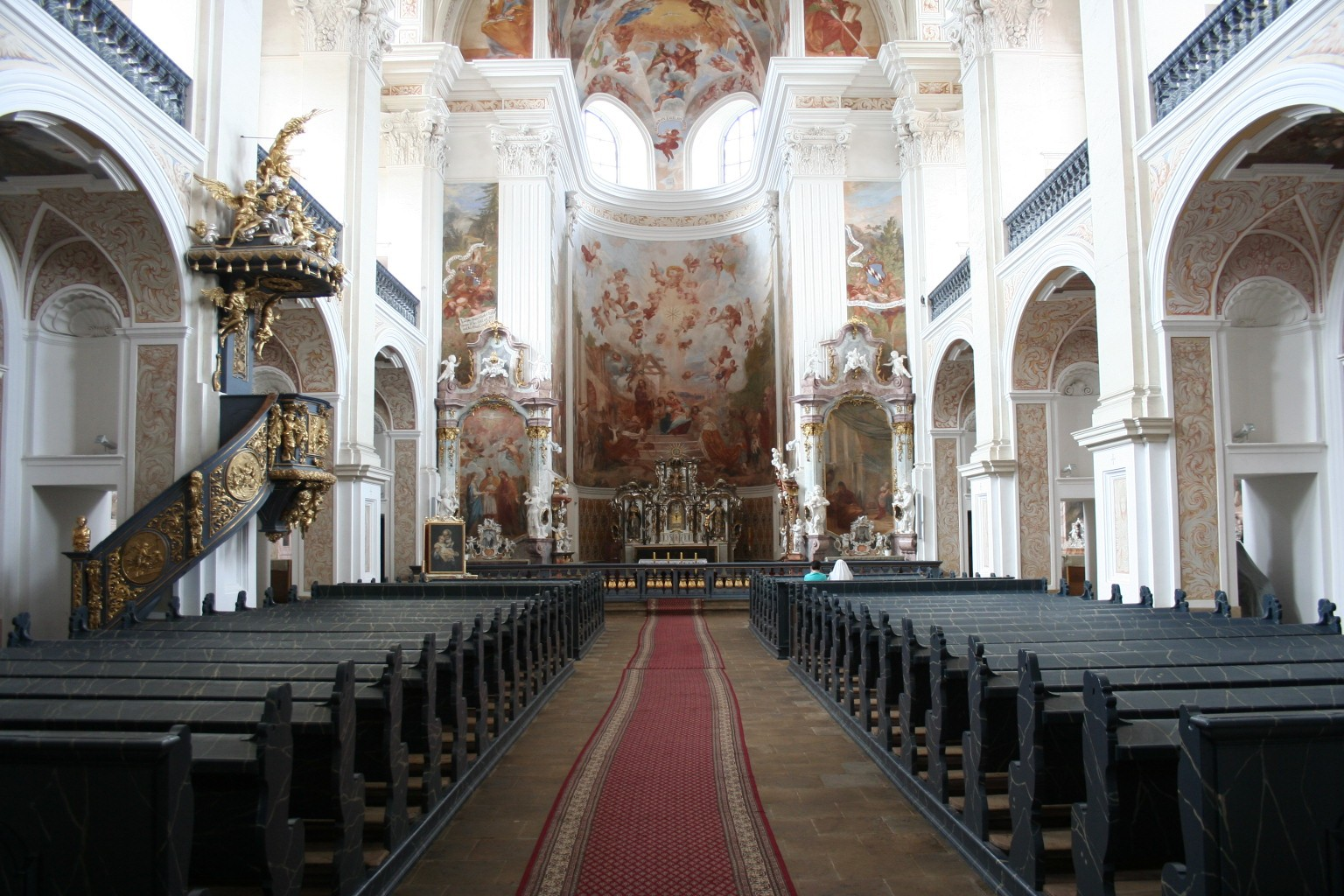
Saint Joseph church interior

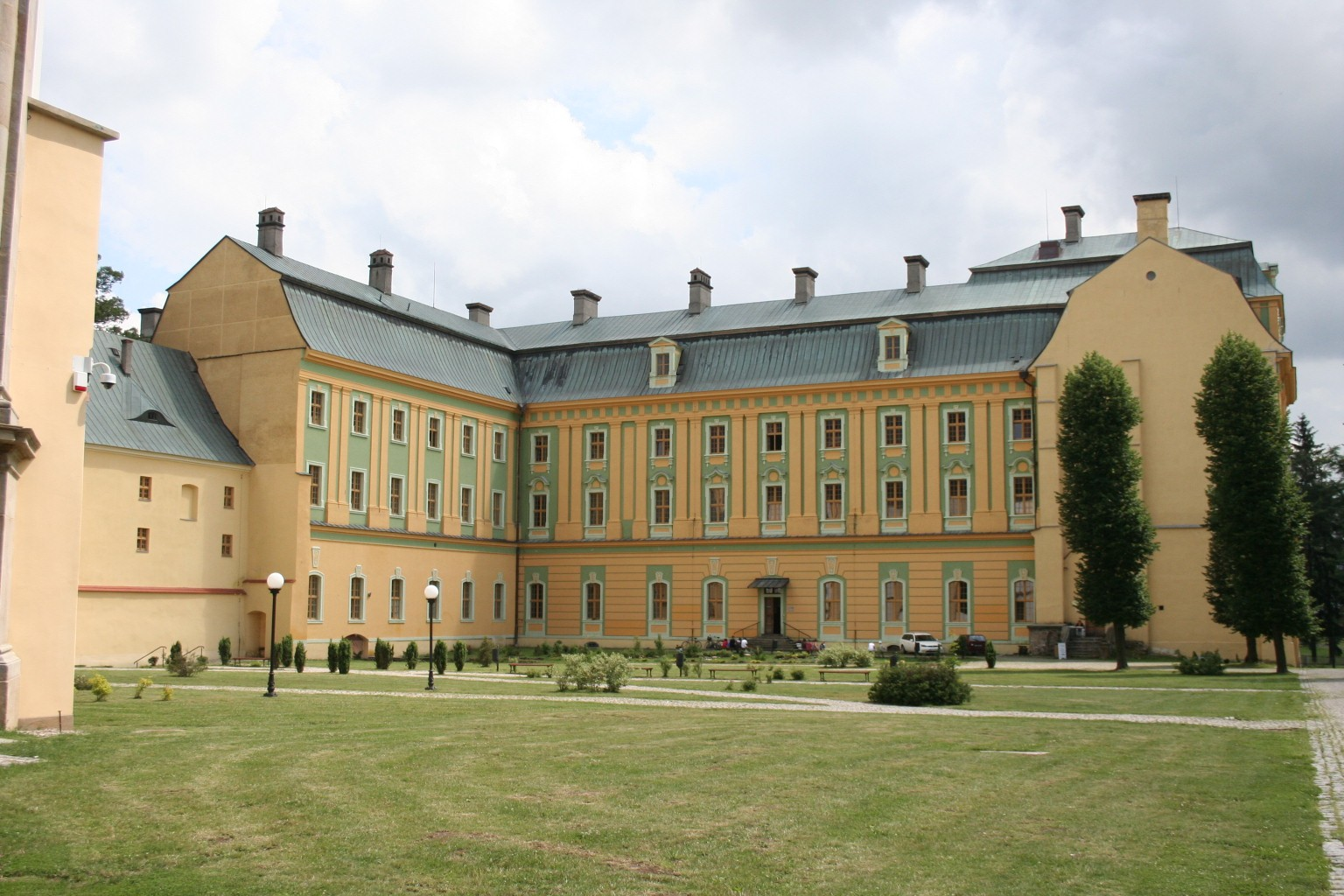
Monastery building

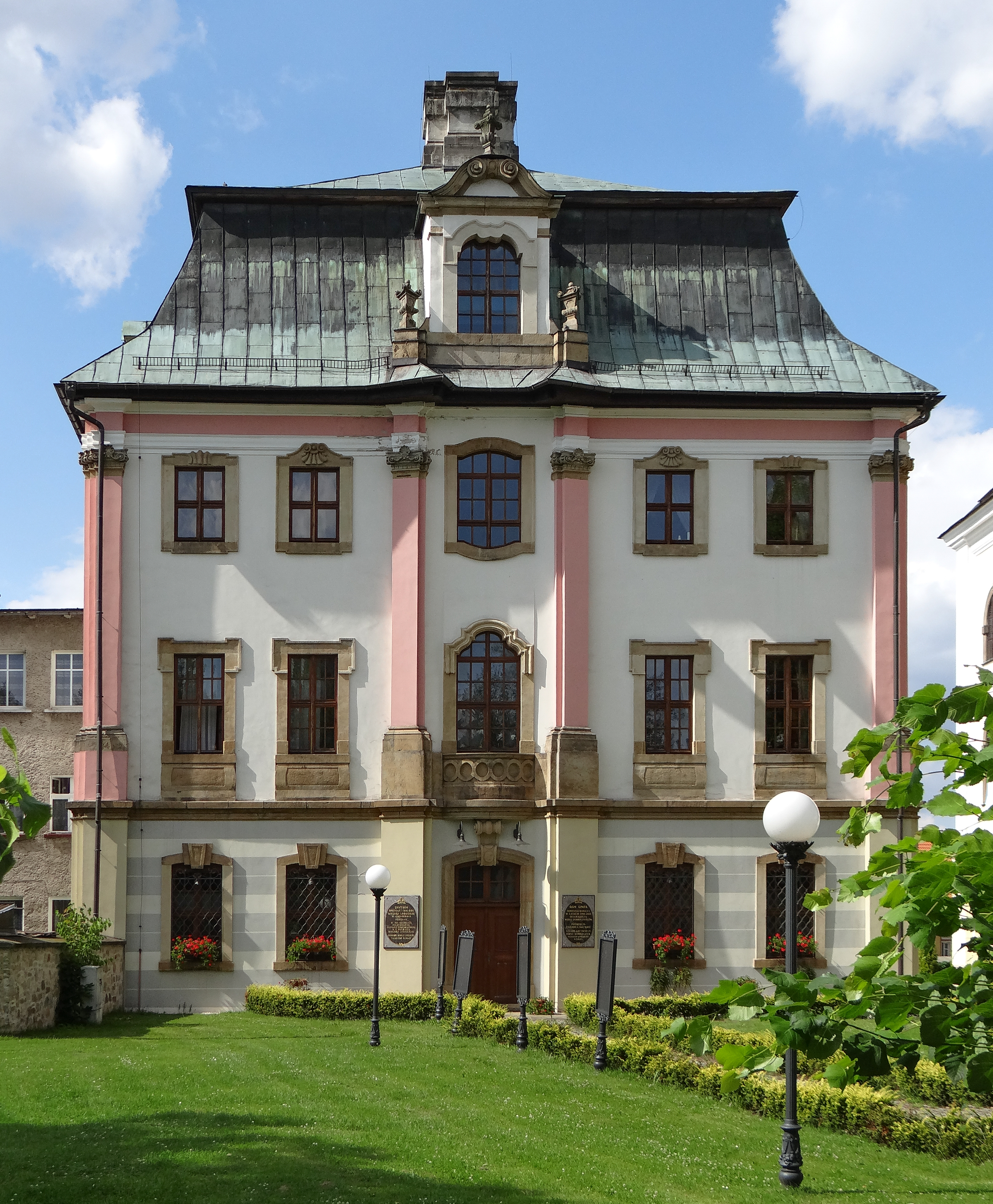
Abbot House
