= Jan Sas Zubrzycki =

Polish architect (1860–1935)

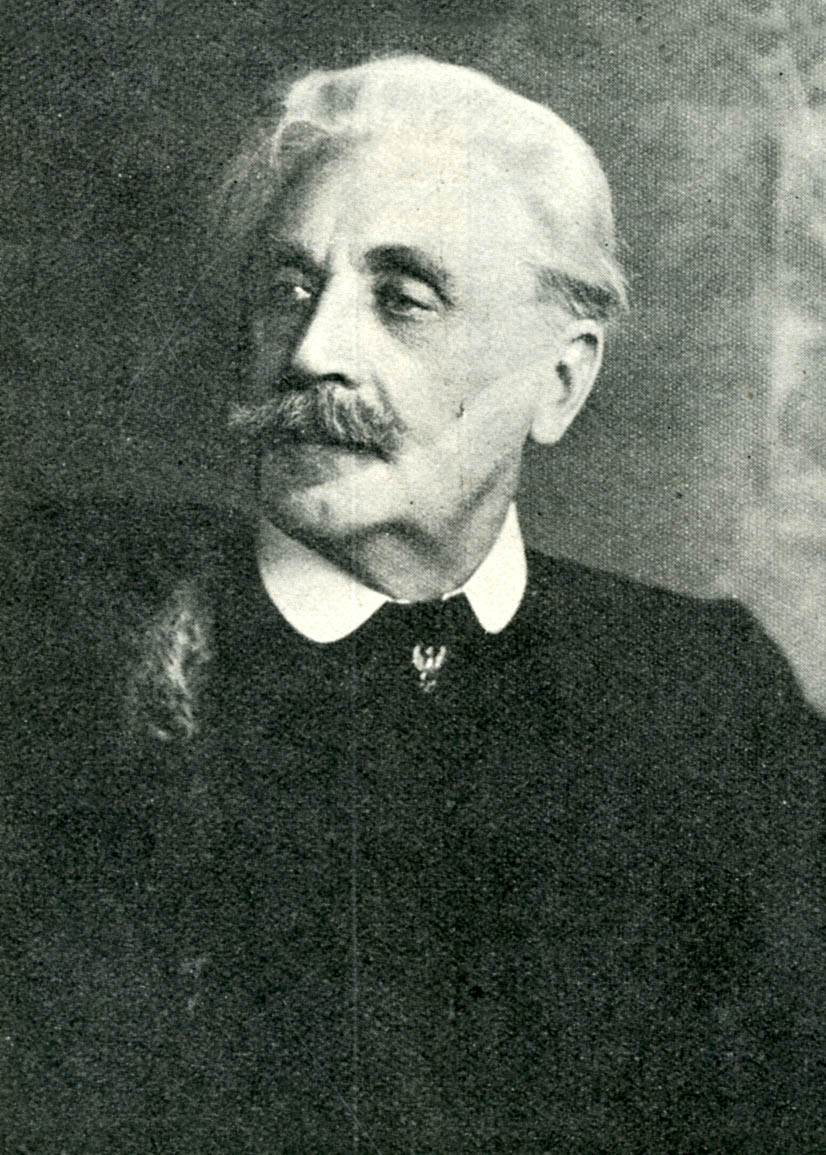
Jan Sas Zubrzycki

Jan Sas Zubrzycki (born 25 June 1860 in Tłuste – died 4 August 1935 in Lwów) was a Polish architect known for his neo-Gothic designs and for developing the "Vistula style". His most notable work is the grand Governor's Palace in Lviv (1876). In 1920, he was appointed to the Board of the Union of Polish Scientific Societies, representing the Society for the Protection of Monuments of Art and Culture.

== Gallery ==
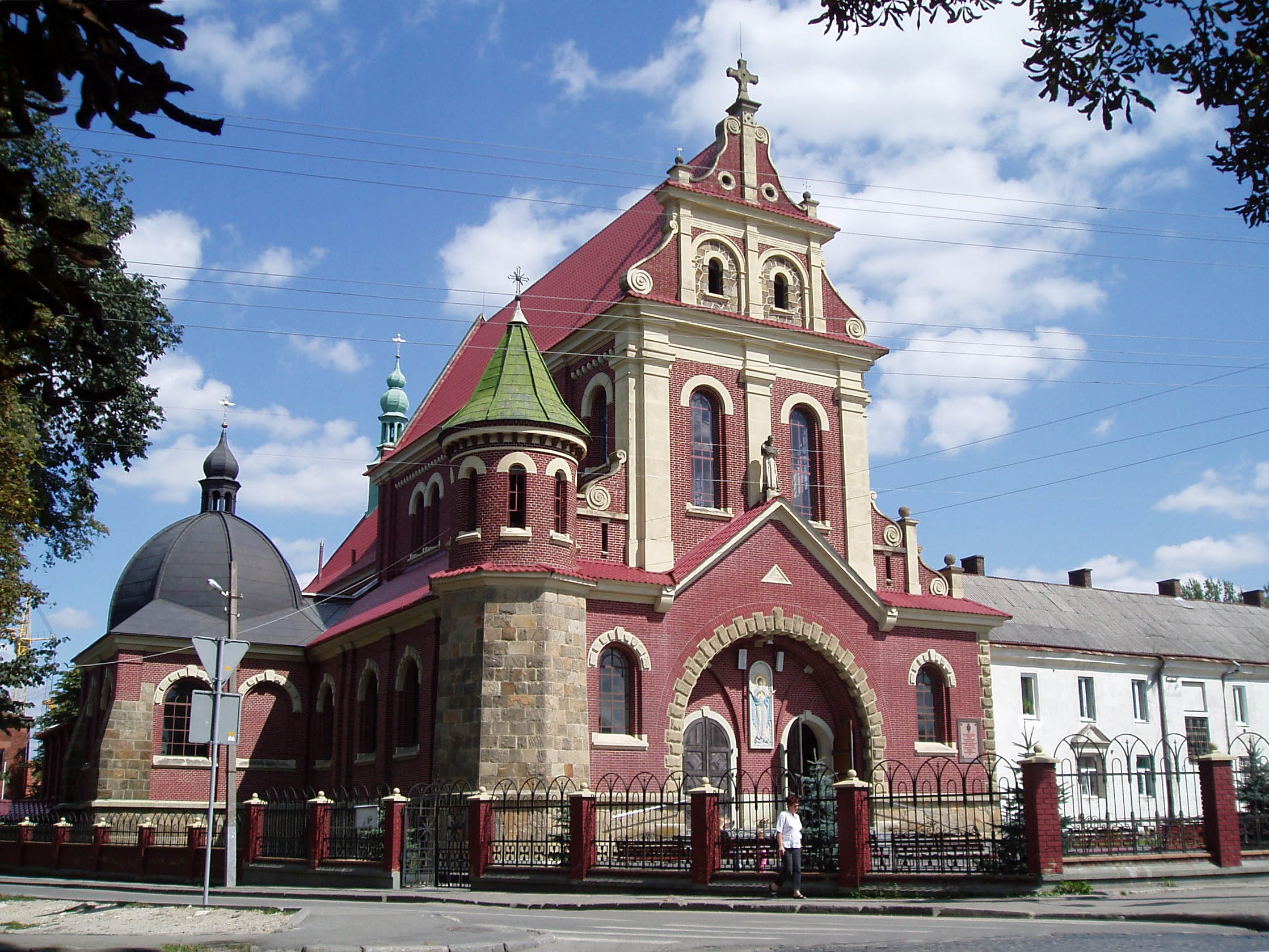
St. Josaphat Church in Lviv

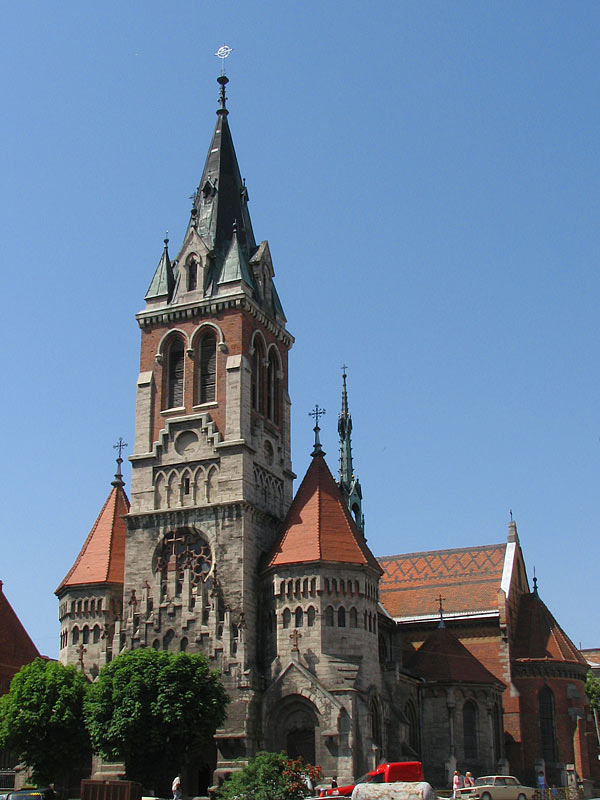
St. Stanislav Church in Chortkiv

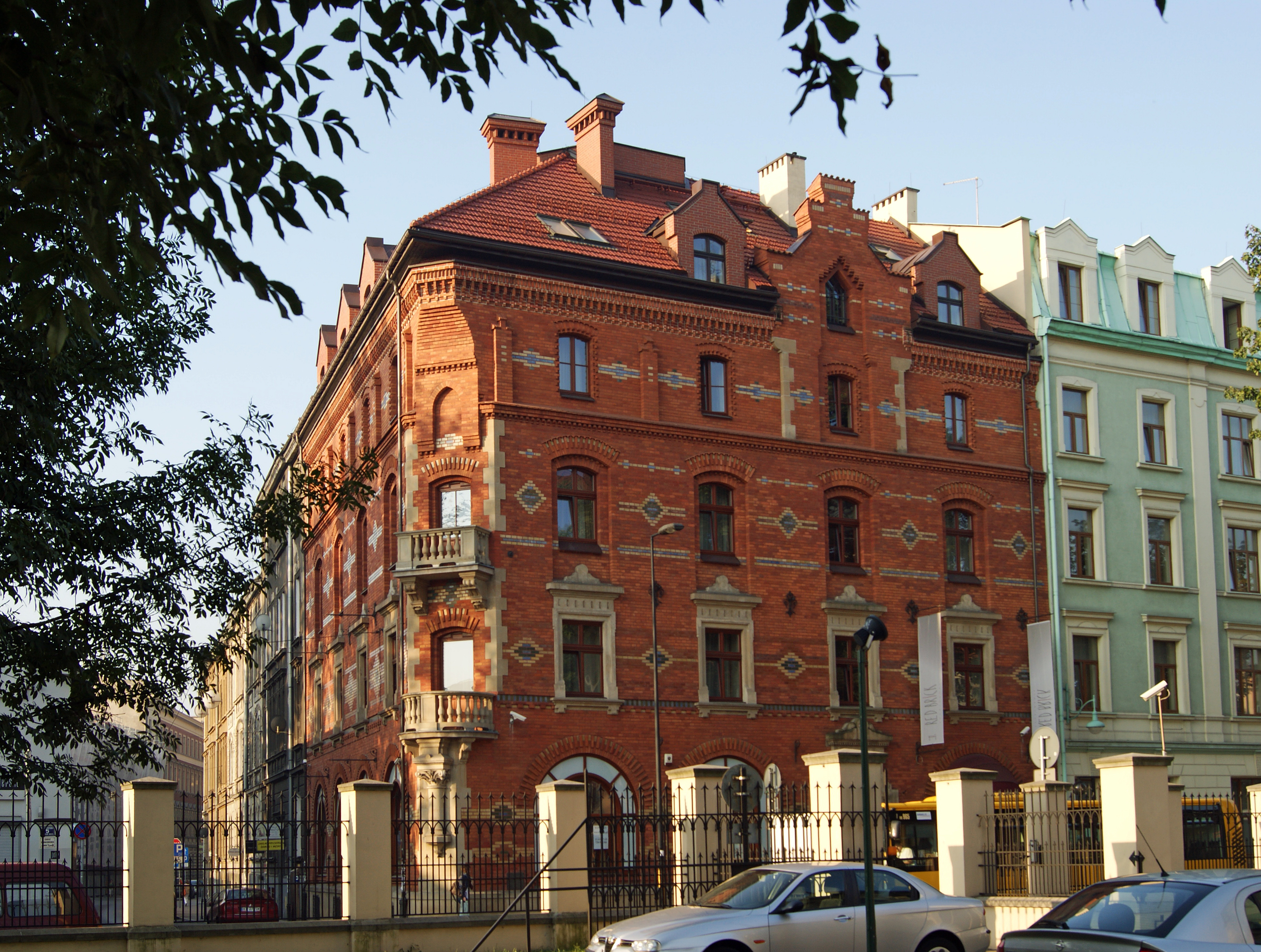
Jan Zimler house, 3 Kurniki street, Kraków

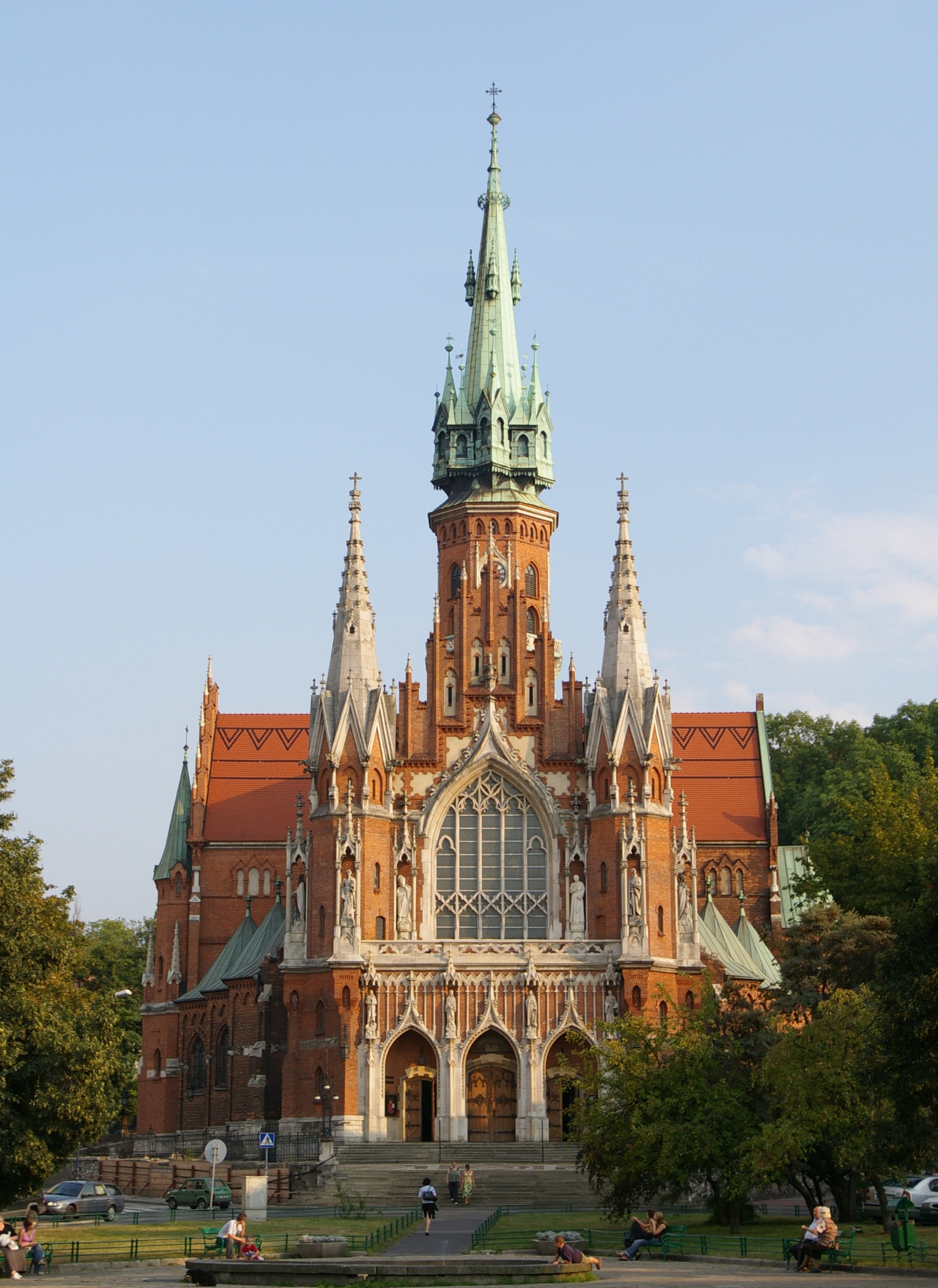
Church of St. Joseph in Kraków

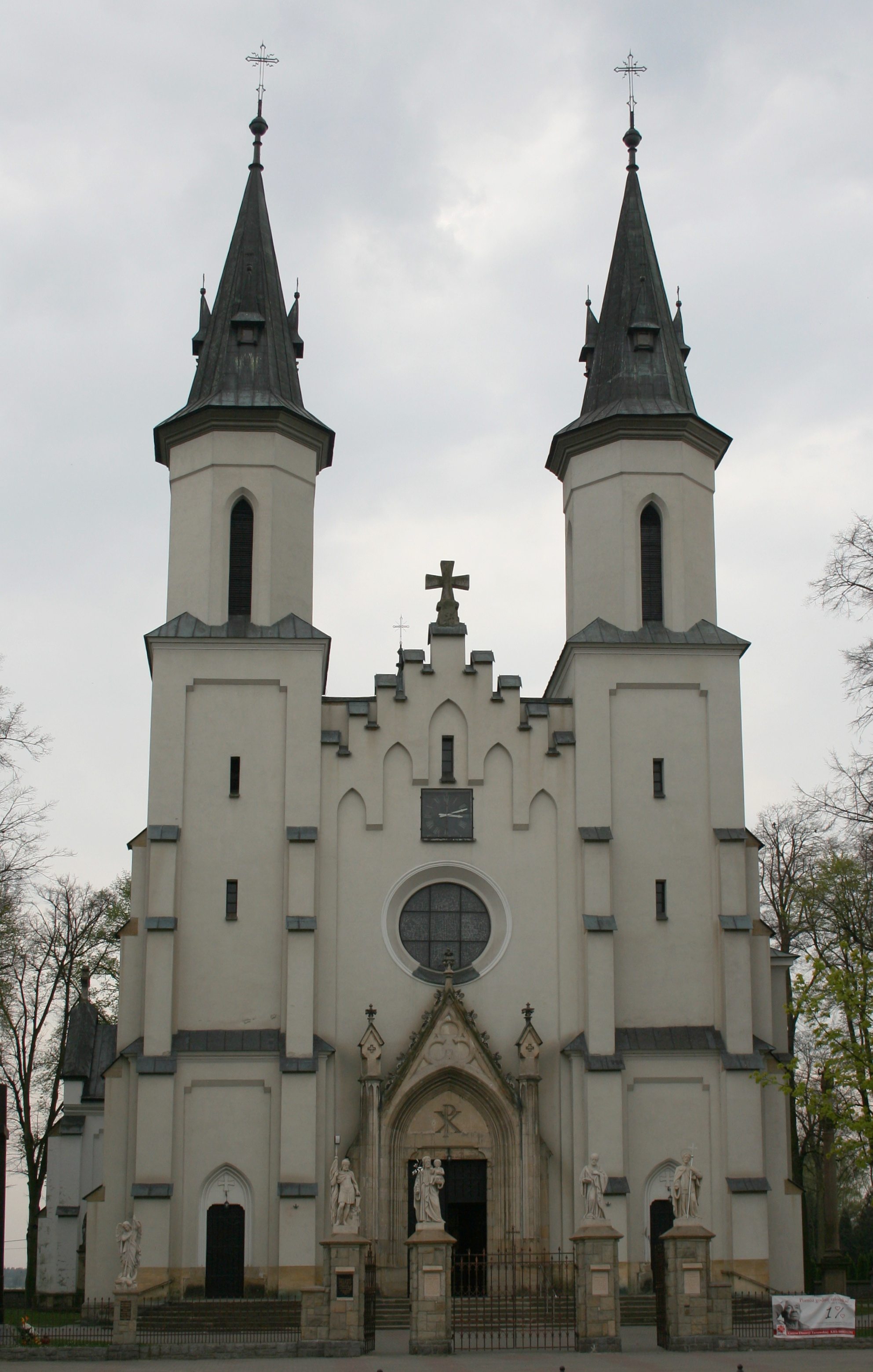
Church of St. Bartholomew in Szczurowa

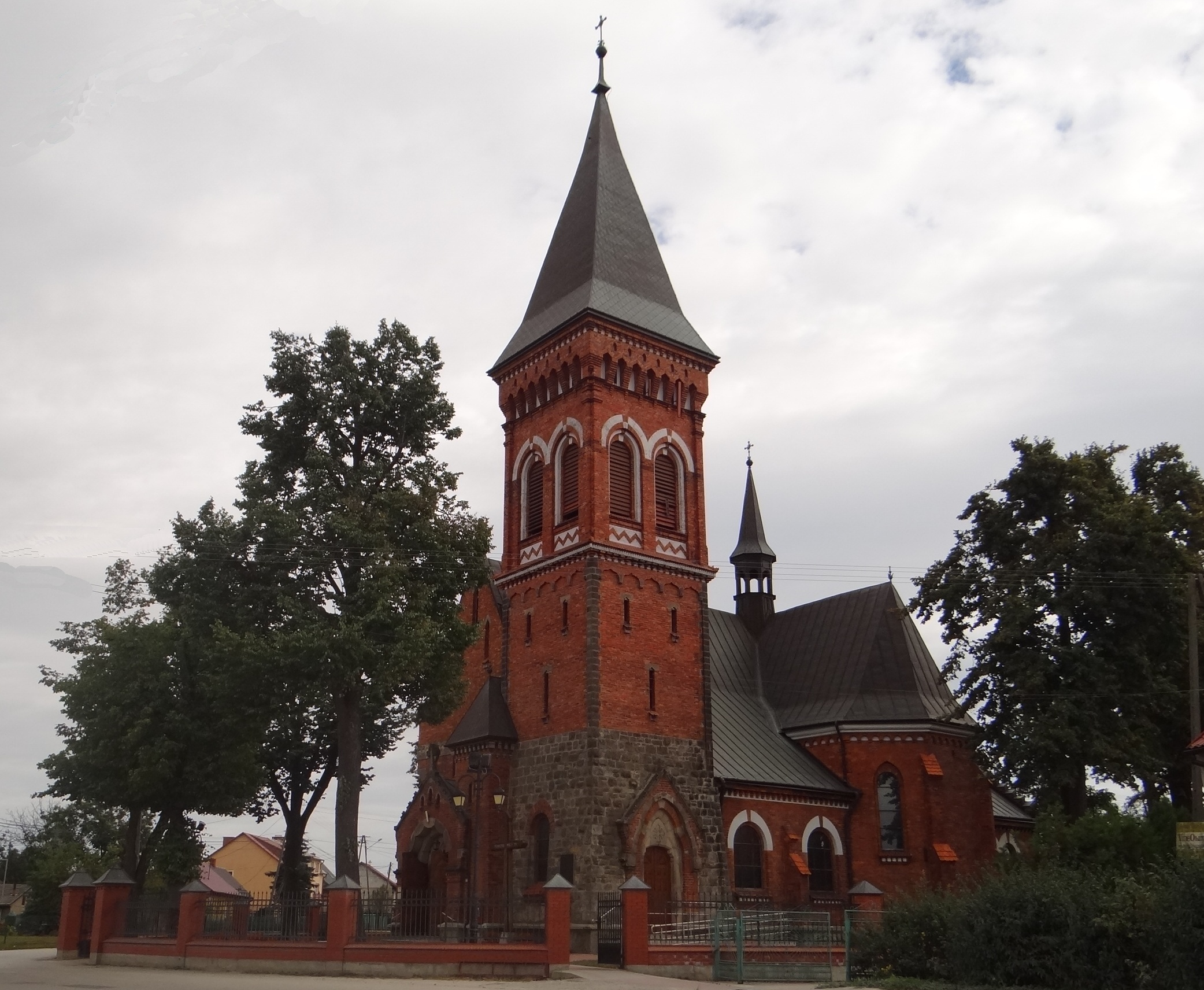
Church of Our Lady of the Angels in Bielcza

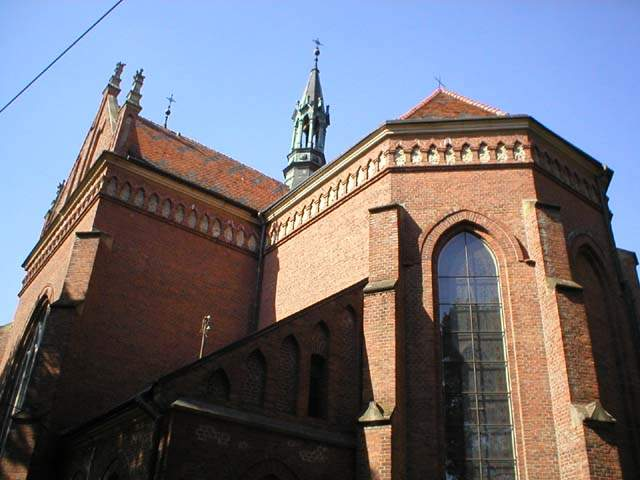
Church of Our Lady of Mount Carmel in Górno

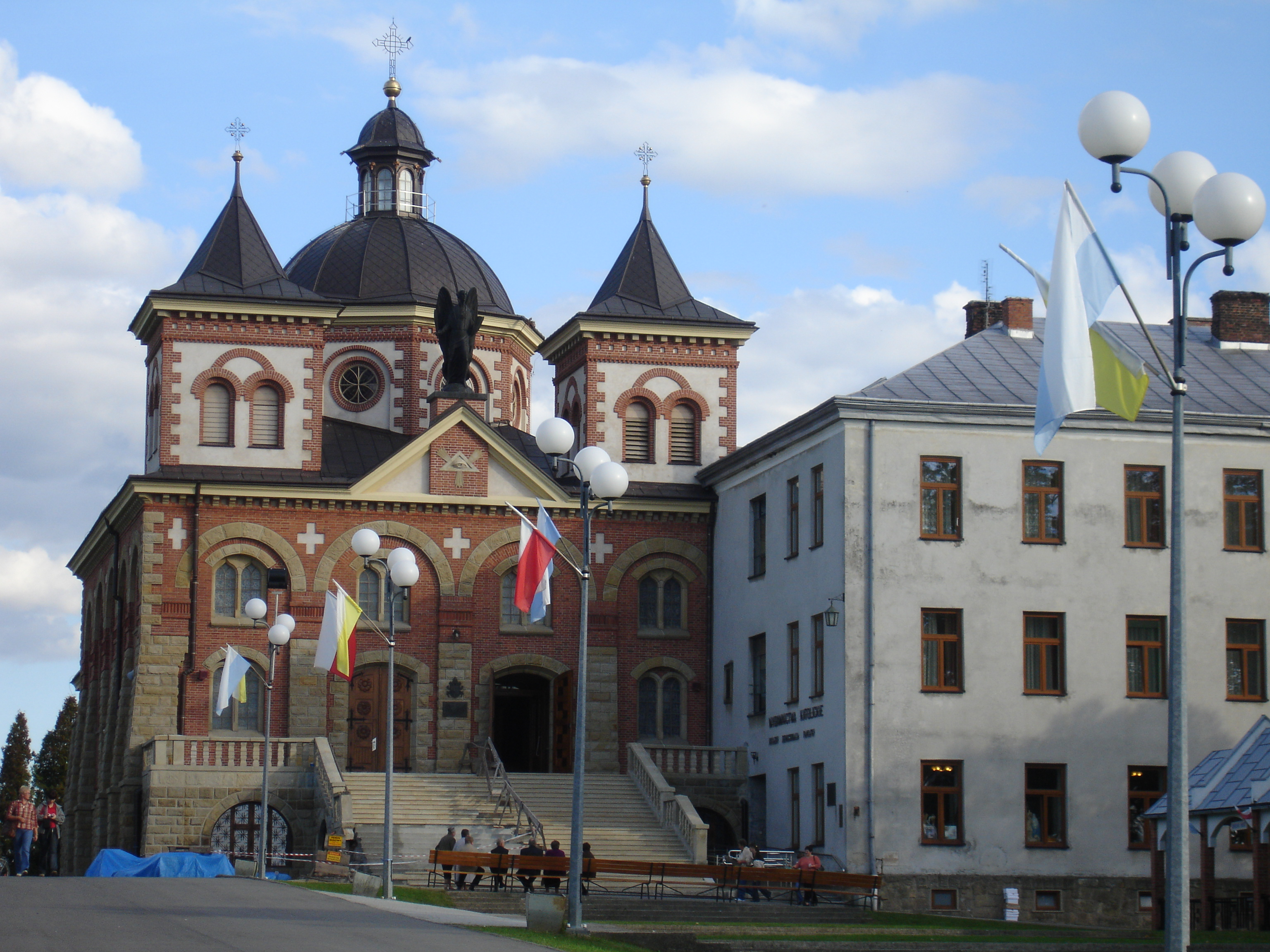
Sanctuary of St. Michael the Archangel and Blessed Bronisław Markiewicz in Miejsce Piastowe

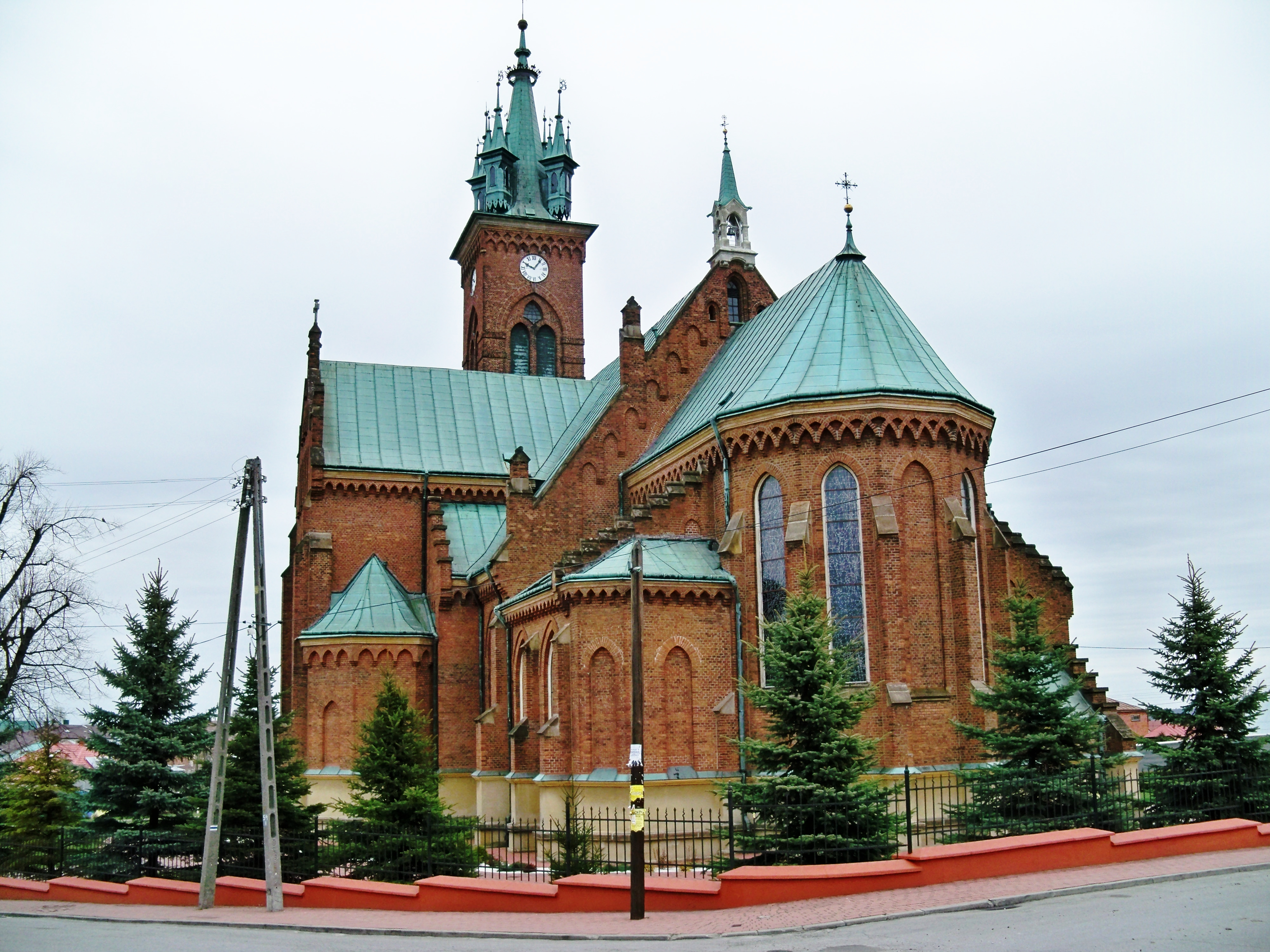
Church of St. John in Sokołów Małopolski

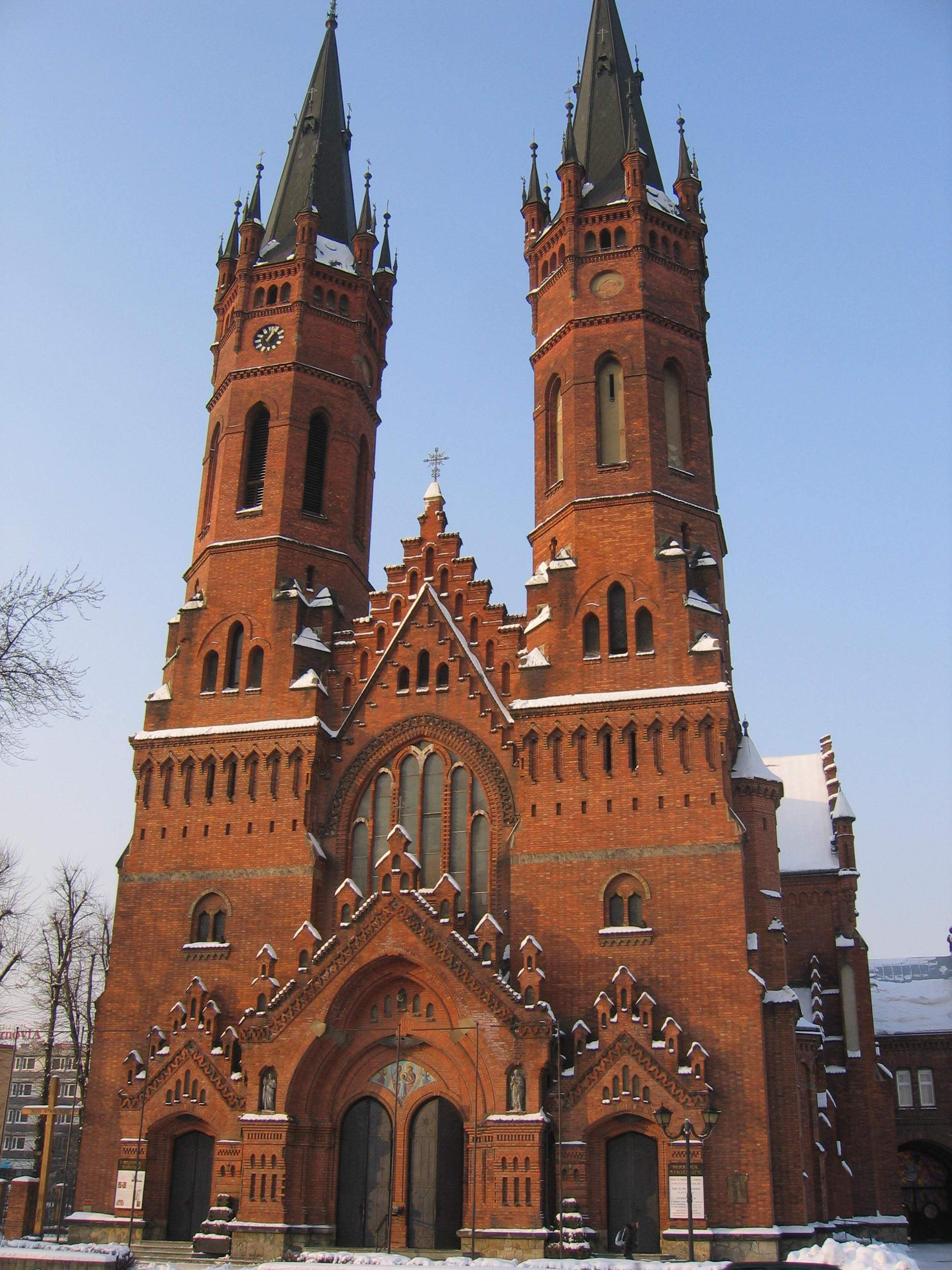
Church of the Holy Family in Tarnów

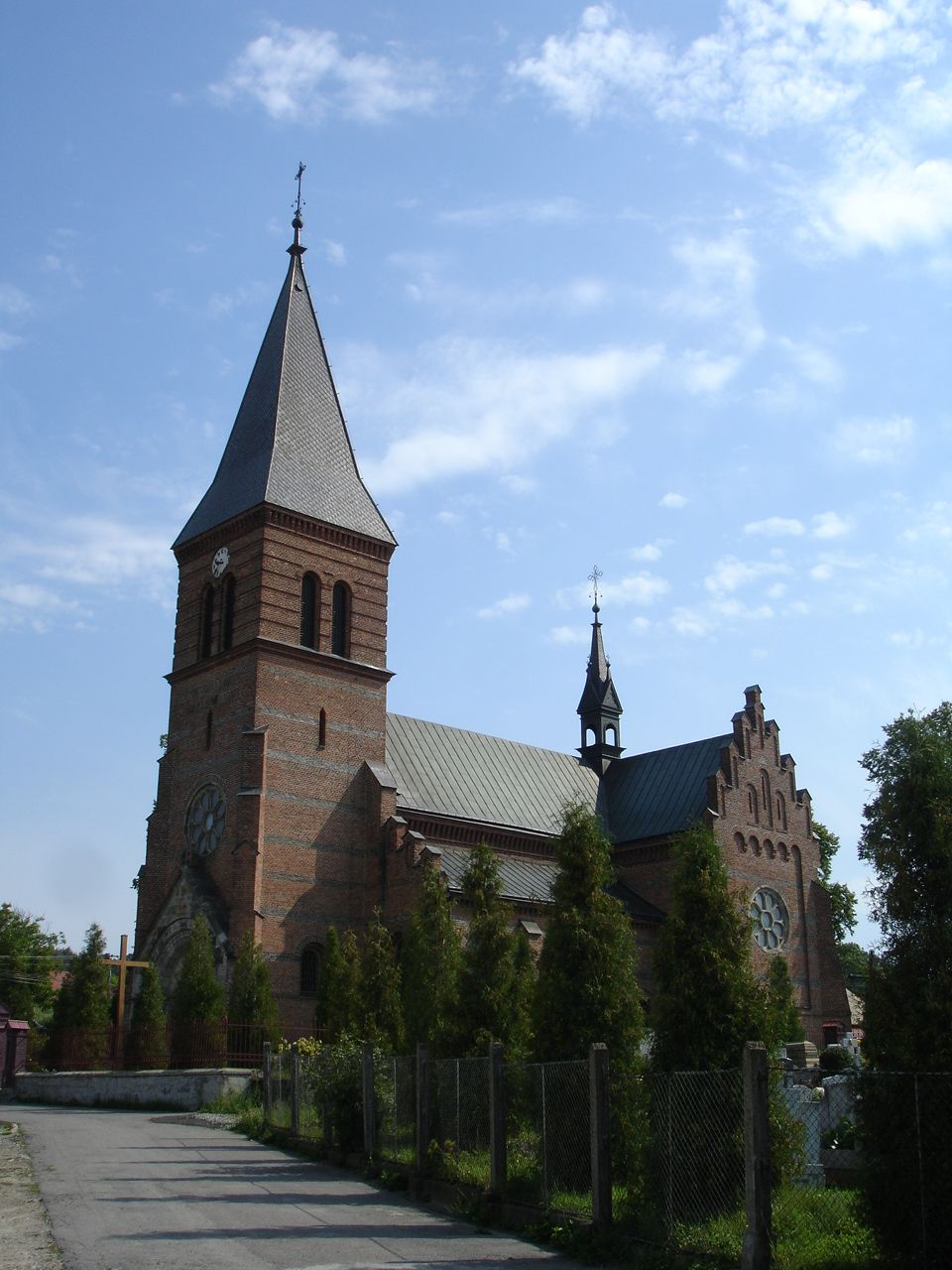
Church of saint Stanislaus Bishop in Trześniów

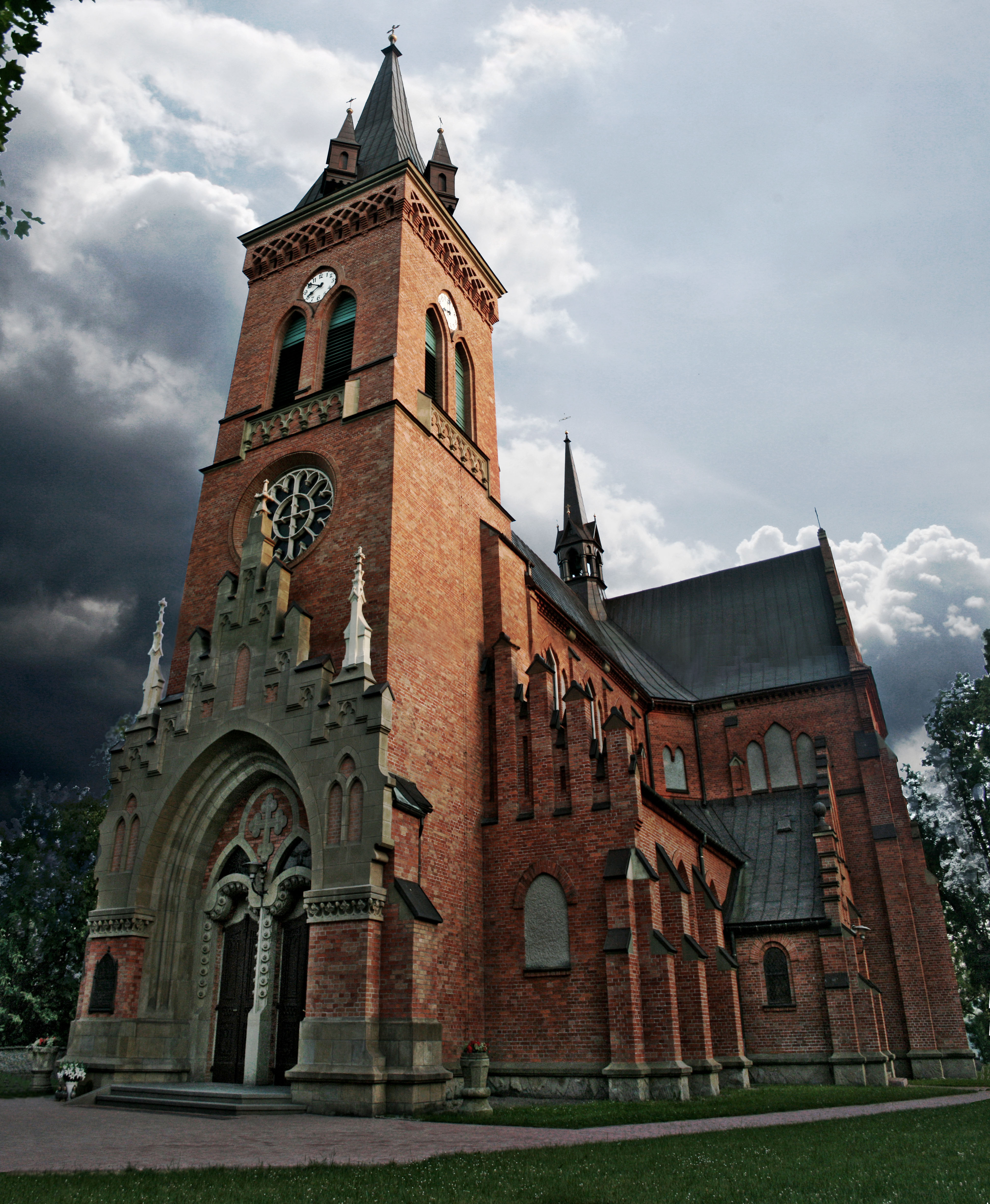
Church of the Holy Trinity in Jordanów

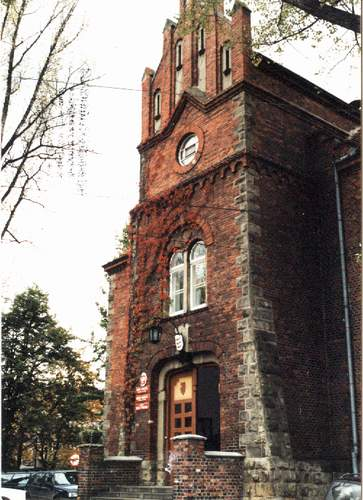
Cityhall in Jordanów

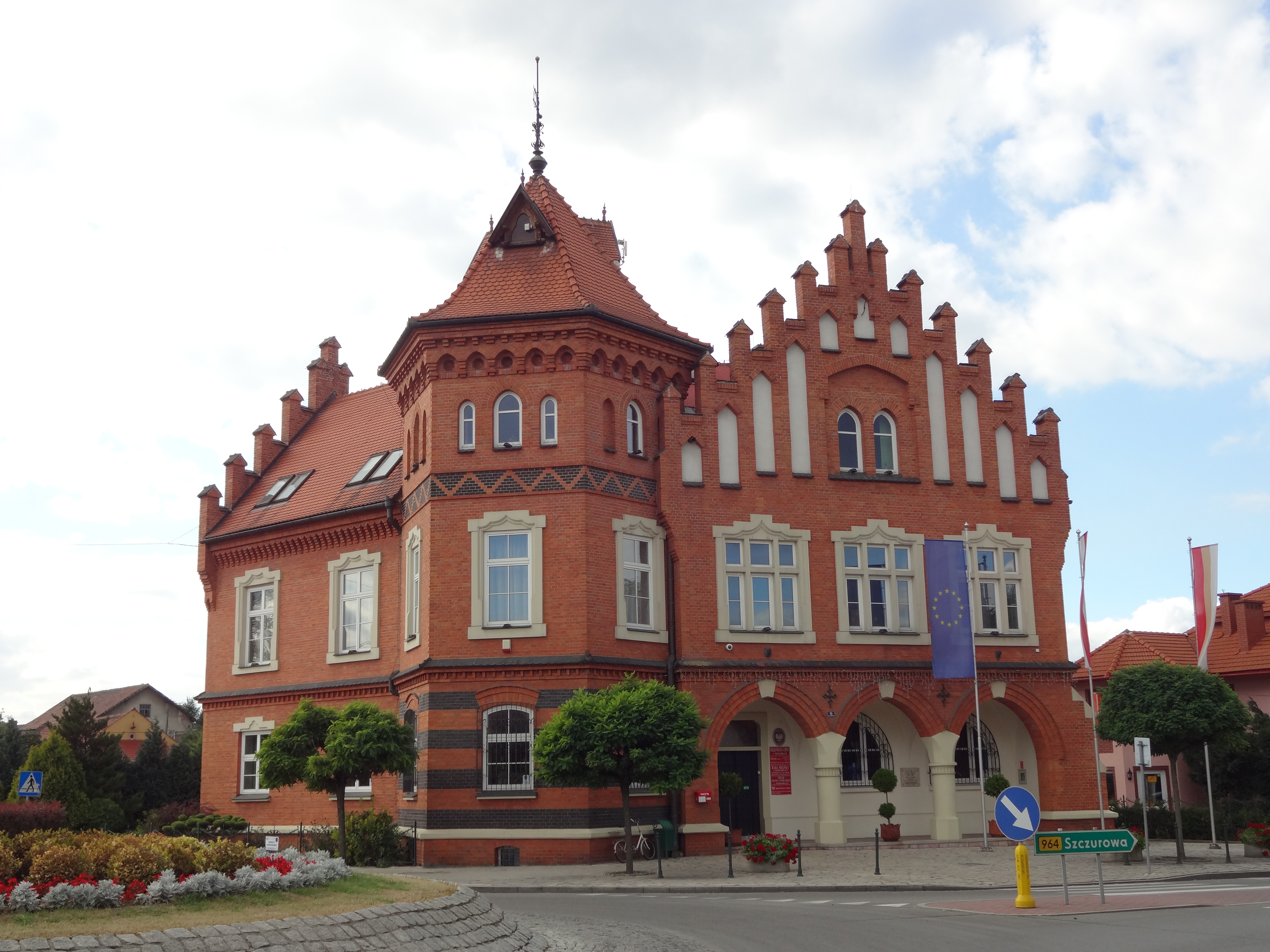
Cityhall in Niepołomice
