= Budziwój =

- District of Rzeszów
- Location within Poland
- Coordinates: 49°57′N 21°59′E
- Country: Poland
- Voivodeship: Subcarpathian
- County: Rzeszów County
- City: Rzeszów

Budziwój ([buˈd͡ʑivui̯]; Ukrainian: Будивой) is a district of the city of Rzeszów. Until 31 December 2009 it was a part of the administrative district of Gmina Tyczyn, within Rzeszów County, Subcarpathian Voivodeship, in south-eastern Poland.
