= Trzebośnica =

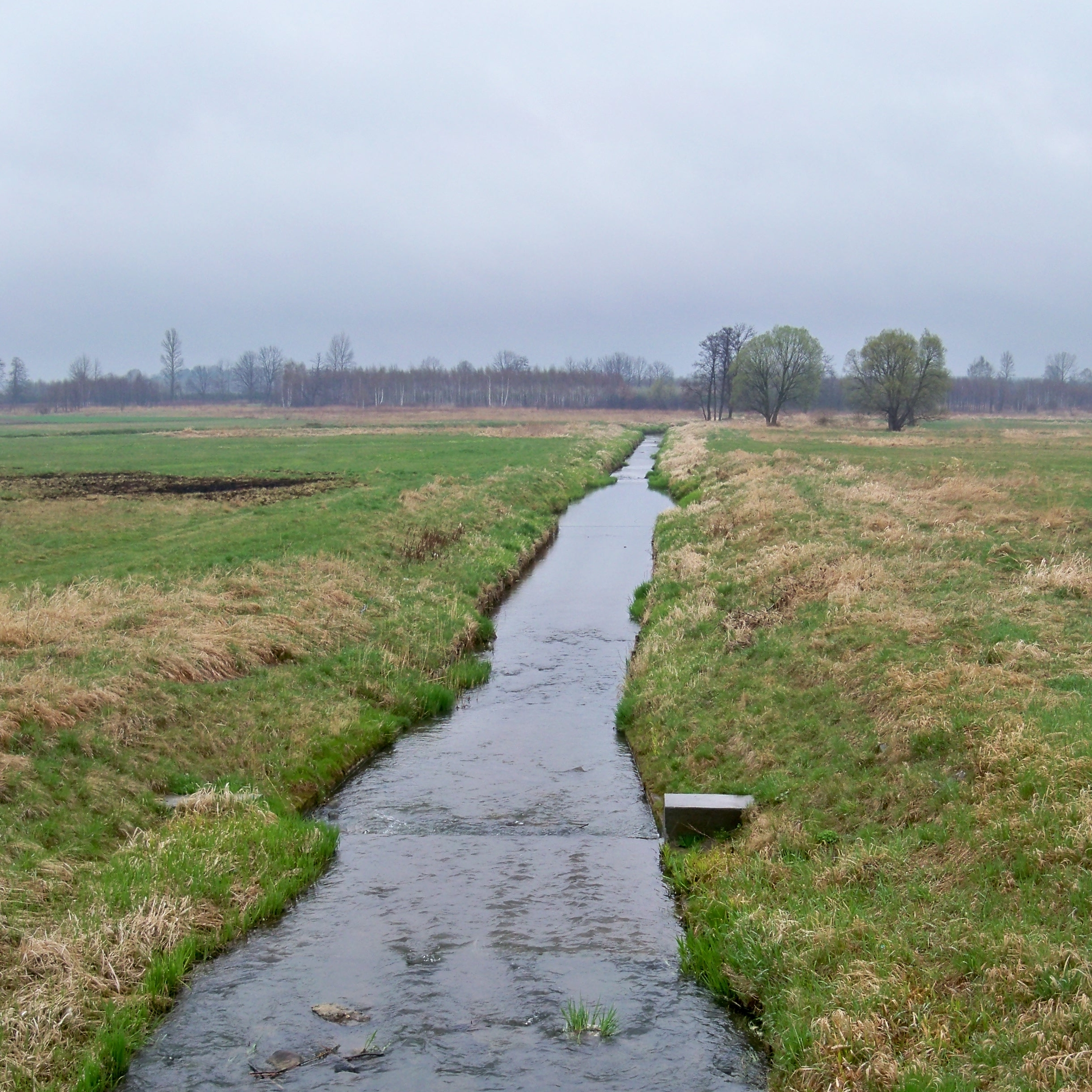
- Trzebośnica on the border of Trzeboś and Kąty Trzebuskie

Location
- Country: Poland
- Voivodeship: Podkarpackie

Physical characteristics
- Source
  - location: near Pogwizdów, Łańcut County
  - coordinates: 50°10′21.8″N 22°06′16.1″E
  - elevation: 221.8 m (728 ft)
- Mouth: San
  - location: northeast of Sarzyna, Leżajsk County
  - coordinates: 50°21′09″N 22°22′17″E
  - elevation: 160 m (520 ft)
- Length: 35.3 km (21.9 mi)
- Basin size: 262.3 km^{2} (101.3 mi^{2})

Basin features
- Progression: San→ Vistula→ Baltic Sea
- Tributaries
  - right: Olechowiec

Trzebośnica is a left tributary of the San River in southeastern Poland. Its length is 35.3 kilometres. It flows into the San near Sarzyna.
