= Borówki, Podkarpackie Voivodeship =

Borówki
- Village
- Location within Poland
- Coordinates: 49°57′N 22°10′E
- Country: Poland
- Voivodeship: Subcarpathian
- County: Rzeszów
- Gmina: Chmielnik

Borówki ([bɔˈrufki]) is a village in the administrative district of Gmina Chmielnik, within Rzeszów County, Subcarpathian Voivodeship, in south-eastern Poland.
