= Białka, Podkarpackie Voivodeship =

Białka
- Village
- Location within Poland
- Coordinates: 49°52′0″N 22°12′46″E
- Country: Poland
- Voivodeship: Subcarpathian
- County: Rzeszów
- Gmina: Błażowa

Białka ([ˈbjau̯ka]) is a village in the administrative district of Gmina Błażowa, within Rzeszów County, Subcarpathian Voivodeship, in south-eastern Poland.
