= Hermanowa =

- Village
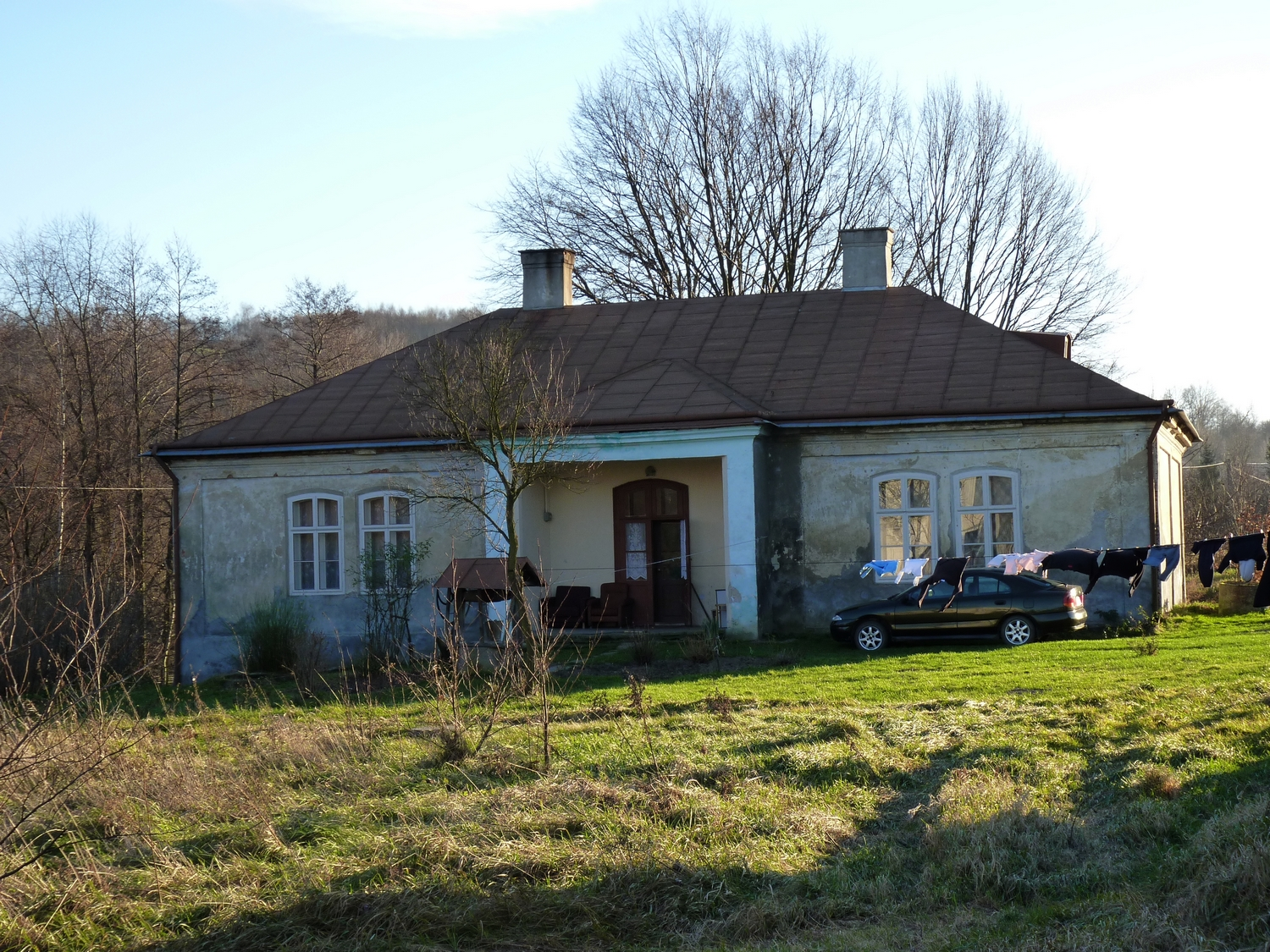
- Manor house

- Location within Poland
- Coordinates: 49°57′N 22°1′E
- Country: Poland
- Voivodeship: Subcarpathian
- County: Rzeszów
- Gmina: Tyczyn

Hermanowa ([xɛrmaˈnɔva]) is a village in the administrative district of Gmina Tyczyn, within Rzeszów County, Subcarpathian Voivodeship, in south-eastern Poland.
