= Malawa, Rzeszów County =

Malawa
- Village
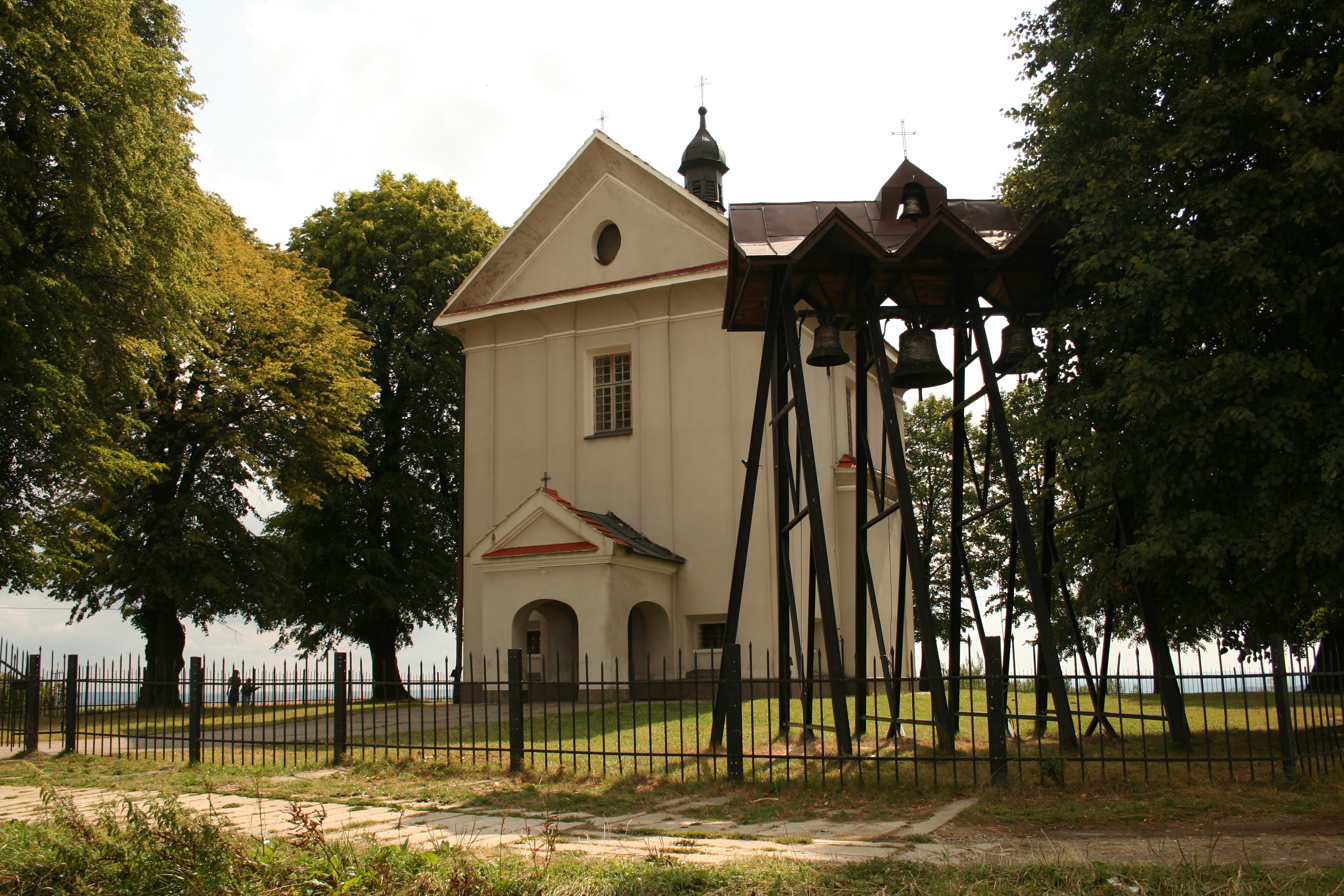
- Saint Magdalene Church

- Location within Poland
- Coordinates: 50°1′50″N 22°5′59″E
- Country: Poland
- Voivodeship: Subcarpathian
- County: Rzeszów
- Gmina: Krasne
- Highest elevation: 380 m (1,250 ft)
- Lowest elevation: 220 m (720 ft)
- Population: 2,850

Malawa [maˈlava] is a village in the administrative district of Gmina Krasne, within Rzeszów County, Subcarpathian Voivodeship, in south-eastern Poland.
