= Grzegorzówka =

- Village
- Location within Poland
- Coordinates: 49°57′N 22°13′E
- Country: Poland
- Voivodeship: Subcarpathian
- County: Rzeszów
- Gmina: Hyżne

Grzegorzówka ([ɡʐɛɡɔˈʐufka]) is a village in the administrative district of Gmina Hyżne, within Rzeszów County, Subcarpathian Voivodeship, in south-eastern Poland.
