= Borek Stary =

- Village
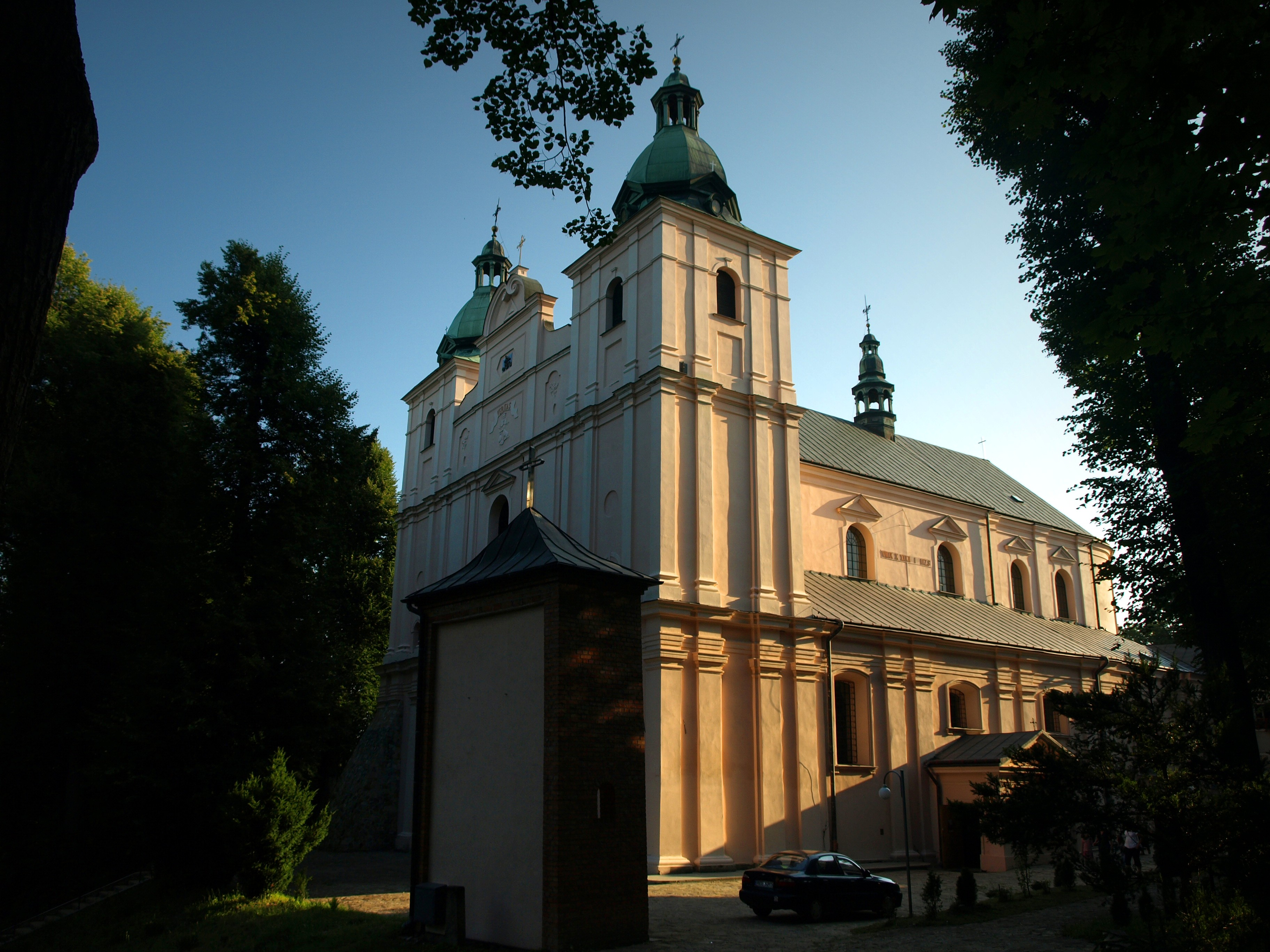
- Church of the Assumption of the Virgin Mary

- Location within Poland
- Coordinates: 49°56′31″N 22°6′12″E
- Country: Poland
- Voivodeship: Subcarpathian
- County: Rzeszów
- Gmina: Tyczyn

Population
  - Total: 1,600

Borek Stary ([ˈbɔrɛk ˈstarɨ]) is a village in the administrative district of Gmina Tyczyn, within Rzeszów County, Subcarpathian Voivodeship, in south-eastern Poland.
