= Palikówka =

- Village
- Location within Poland
- Coordinates: 50°5′N 22°9′E
- Country: Poland
- Voivodeship: Subcarpathian
- County: Rzeszów
- Gmina: Krasne
- Elevation: 193 m (633 ft)
- Population: 1,200
- Website: www.palikowka.com.pl

Palikówka [paliˈkufka] is a village in the administrative district of Gmina Krasne, within Rzeszów County, Subcarpathian Voivodeship, in south-eastern Poland.
