= Kąkolówka =

- Village
- Location within Poland
- Coordinates: 49°51′N 22°4′E
- Country: Poland
- Voivodeship: Subcarpathian
- County: Rzeszów
- Gmina: Błażowa
- Population: 1,500

Kąkolówka [kɔnkɔˈlufka] is a village in the administrative district of Gmina Błażowa, within Rzeszów County, Subcarpathian Voivodeship, in south-eastern Poland.
