= Błażowa Dolna =

- Village
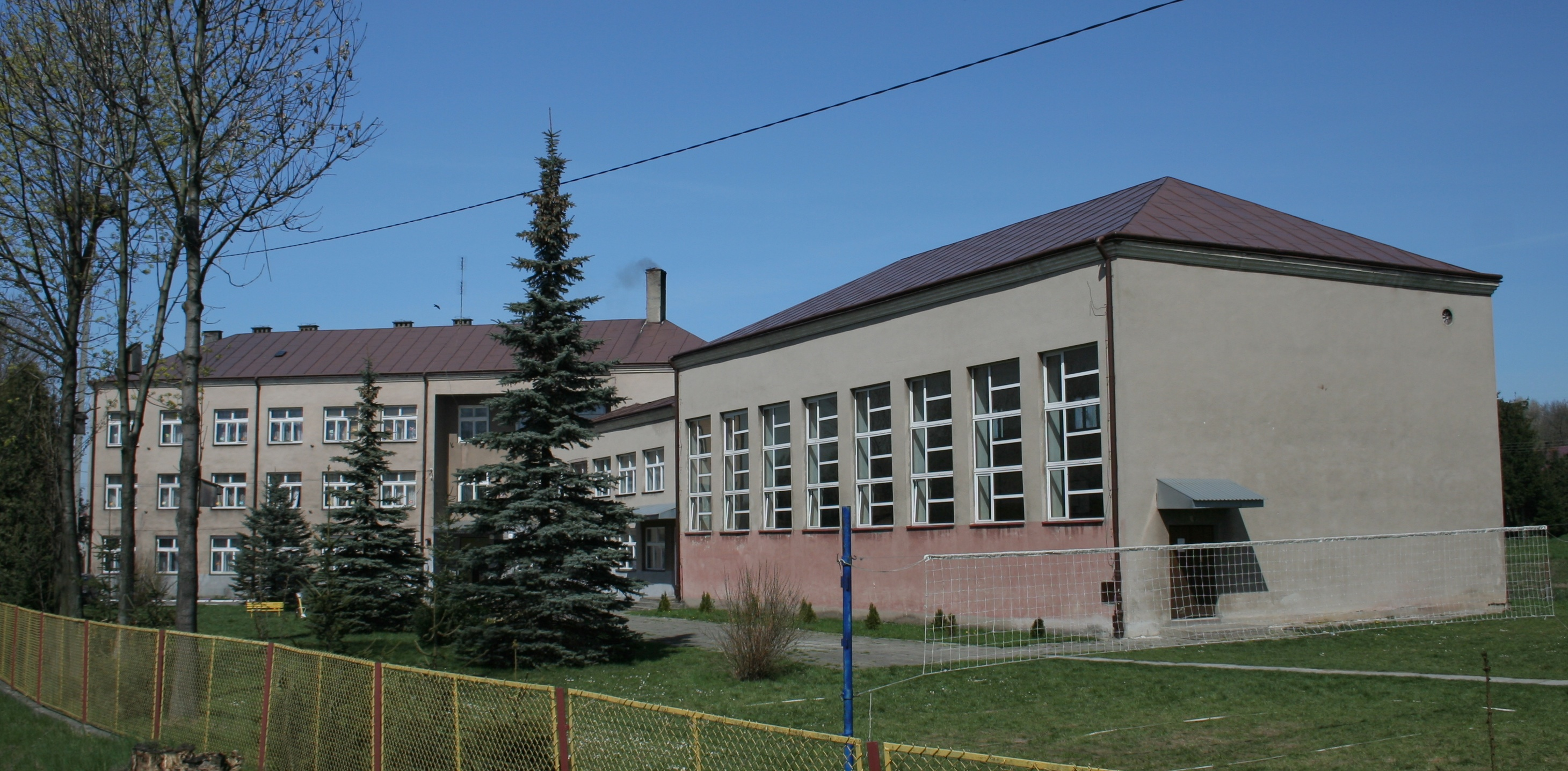
- Elementary school in Błażowa Dolna

- Coat of arms

- Location within Poland
- Coordinates: 49°54′21″N 22°22′41″E
- Country: Poland
- Voivodeship: Subcarpathian
- County: Rzeszów
- Gmina: Błażowa

Błażowa Dolna ([bwaˈʐɔva ˈdɔlna]) is a village in the administrative district of Gmina Błażowa, within Rzeszów County, Subcarpathian Voivodeship, in south-eastern Poland.
