= Markowizna, Podkarpackie Voivodeship =

Markowizna
- Village
- Location within Poland
- Coordinates: 50°17′N 22°5′E
- Country: Poland
- Voivodeship: Subcarpathian
- County: Rzeszów
- Gmina: Sokołów Małopolski

Markowizna [markɔˈvizna] is a village in the administrative district of Gmina Sokołów Małopolski, within Rzeszów County, Subcarpathian Voivodeship, in south-eastern Poland.
