= Mokłuczka =

- Village
- Location within Poland
- Coordinates: 49°54′4″N 22°7′50″E
- Country: Poland
- Voivodeship: Subcarpathian
- County: Rzeszów
- Gmina: Błażowa

Mokłuczka [mɔˈkwut͡ʂka] is a village in the administrative district of Gmina Błażowa, within Rzeszów County, Subcarpathian Voivodeship, in south-eastern Poland.
