= Gmina Krasne =

Gmina Krasne may refer to either of the following rural administrative districts in Poland:

- Gmina Krasne, Masovian Voivodeship
- Gmina Krasne, Subcarpathian Voivodeship
