= Brzezówka, Rzeszów County =

Brzezówka
- Village
- Location within Poland
- Coordinates: 49°55′42″N 22°09′17″E
- Country: Poland
- Voivodeship: Subcarpathian
- County: Rzeszów
- Gmina: Hyżne
- Time zone: UTC+1 (CET)
  - Summer (DST): UTC+2 (CEST)
- Vehicle registration: RZE

Brzezówka ([bʐɛˈzufka]) is a village in the administrative district of Gmina Hyżne, within Rzeszów County, Subcarpathian Voivodeship, in south-eastern Poland.

Four Polish citizens were murdered by Nazi Germany in the village during World War II.
