= Gmina Kamień =

Gmina Kamień may refer to either of the following rural administrative districts in Poland:

- Gmina Kamień, Lublin Voivodeship
- Gmina Kamień, Subcarpathian Voivodeship
