= Gmina Chmielnik =

Gmina Chmielnik may refer to either of the following administrative districts in Poland:

- Gmina Chmielnik, Świętokrzyskie Voivodeship
- Gmina Chmielnik, Subcarpathian Voivodeship
