= Wola Rafałowska, Podkarpackie Voivodeship =

Wola Rafałowska
- Village
- Location within Poland
- Coordinates: 49°59′N 22°11′E
- Country: Poland
- Voivodeship: Subcarpathian
- County: Rzeszów
- Gmina: Chmielnik

Wola Rafałowska [ˈvɔla rafaˈwɔfska] is a village in the administrative district of Gmina Chmielnik, within Rzeszów County, Subcarpathian Voivodeship, in south-eastern Poland.
