= Wólka Sokołowska =

- Village
- Location within Poland
- Coordinates: 50°15′N 22°12′E
- Country: Poland
- Voivodeship: Subcarpathian
- County: Rzeszów
- Gmina: Sokołów Małopolski
- Population: 231

Wólka Sokołowska [ˈvulka sɔkɔˈwɔfska] is a village in the administrative district of Gmina Sokołów Małopolski, within Rzeszów County, Subcarpathian Voivodeship, in south-eastern Poland.
