= Turza, Podkarpackie Voivodeship =

Turza
- Village
- Location within Poland
- Coordinates: 50°15′N 22°7′E
- Country: Poland
- Voivodeship: Subcarpathian
- County: Rzeszów
- Gmina: Sokołów Małopolski

Population
  - Total: 700
- Time zone: UTC+1 (CET)
  - Summer (DST): UTC+2 (CEST)
- Vehicle registration: RZE

Turza [ˈtuʐa] is a village in the administrative district of Gmina Sokołów Małopolski, within Rzeszów County, Subcarpathian Voivodeship, in south-eastern Poland.

During the Polish–Lithuanian–Teutonic War of 1409–1411, in 1410, the King of Poland, Władysław II Jagiełło, was on a hunting trip in Turza, with the aim of stocking up on meat ahead of the battles against the Teutonic Knights.
