= Wólka Niedźwiedzka =

- Village
- Location within Poland
- Coordinates: 50°14′N 22°11′E
- Country: Poland
- Voivodeship: Subcarpathian
- County: Rzeszów
- Gmina: Sokołów Małopolski
- Population: 1,800

Wólka Niedźwiedzka [ˈvulka ɲɛd͡ʑˈvjɛt͡ska] is a village in the administrative district of Gmina Sokołów Małopolski, within Rzeszów County, Subcarpathian Voivodeship, in south-eastern Poland.
