= Kielnarowa =

- Village
- Location within Poland
- Coordinates: 49°58′N 22°4′E
- Country: Poland
- Voivodeship: Subcarpathian
- County: Rzeszów
- Gmina: Tyczyn

Kielnarowa [kʲɛlnaˈrɔva] is a village in the administrative district of Gmina Tyczyn, within Rzeszów County, Subcarpathian Voivodeship, in south-eastern Poland.
