= Nowy Borek =

Nowy Borek may refer to the following places:

- Nowy Borek, Podlaskie Voivodeship (north-east Poland)
- Nowy Borek, Subcarpathian Voivodeship (south-east Poland)
- Nowy Borek, West Pomeranian Voivodeship (north-west Poland)
