= Krzywa Wieś, Podkarpackie Voivodeship =

Krzywa Wieś
- Village
- Location within Poland
- Coordinates: 50°18′21″N 22°7′3″E
- Country: Poland
- Voivodeship: Subcarpathian
- County: Rzeszów
- Gmina: Kamień

Krzywa Wieś [ˈkʂɨva ˈvjɛɕ] is a village in the administrative district of Gmina Kamień, within Rzeszów County, Subcarpathian Voivodeship, in south-eastern Poland.
