= Ujazdy, Rzeszów County =

Ujazdy
- Village
- Location within Poland
- Coordinates: 49°49′52″N 22°5′25″E
- Country: Poland
- Voivodeship: Subcarpathian
- County: Rzeszów
- Gmina: Błażowa

Ujazdy [uˈjazdɨ] is a village in the administrative district of Gmina Błażowa, within Rzeszów County, Subcarpathian Voivodeship, in south-eastern Poland.
