= Nieborów, Podkarpackie Voivodeship =

Nieborów
- Village
- Location within Poland
- Coordinates: 49°56′N 22°11′E
- Country: Poland
- Voivodeship: Subcarpathian
- County: Rzeszów
- Gmina: Hyżne
- Population (approx.): 360

Nieborów [ɲɛˈbɔruf] is a village in the administrative district of Gmina Hyżne, within Rzeszów County, Subcarpathian Voivodeship, in south-eastern Poland.
