= Nienadówka =

- Wieś w Polsce
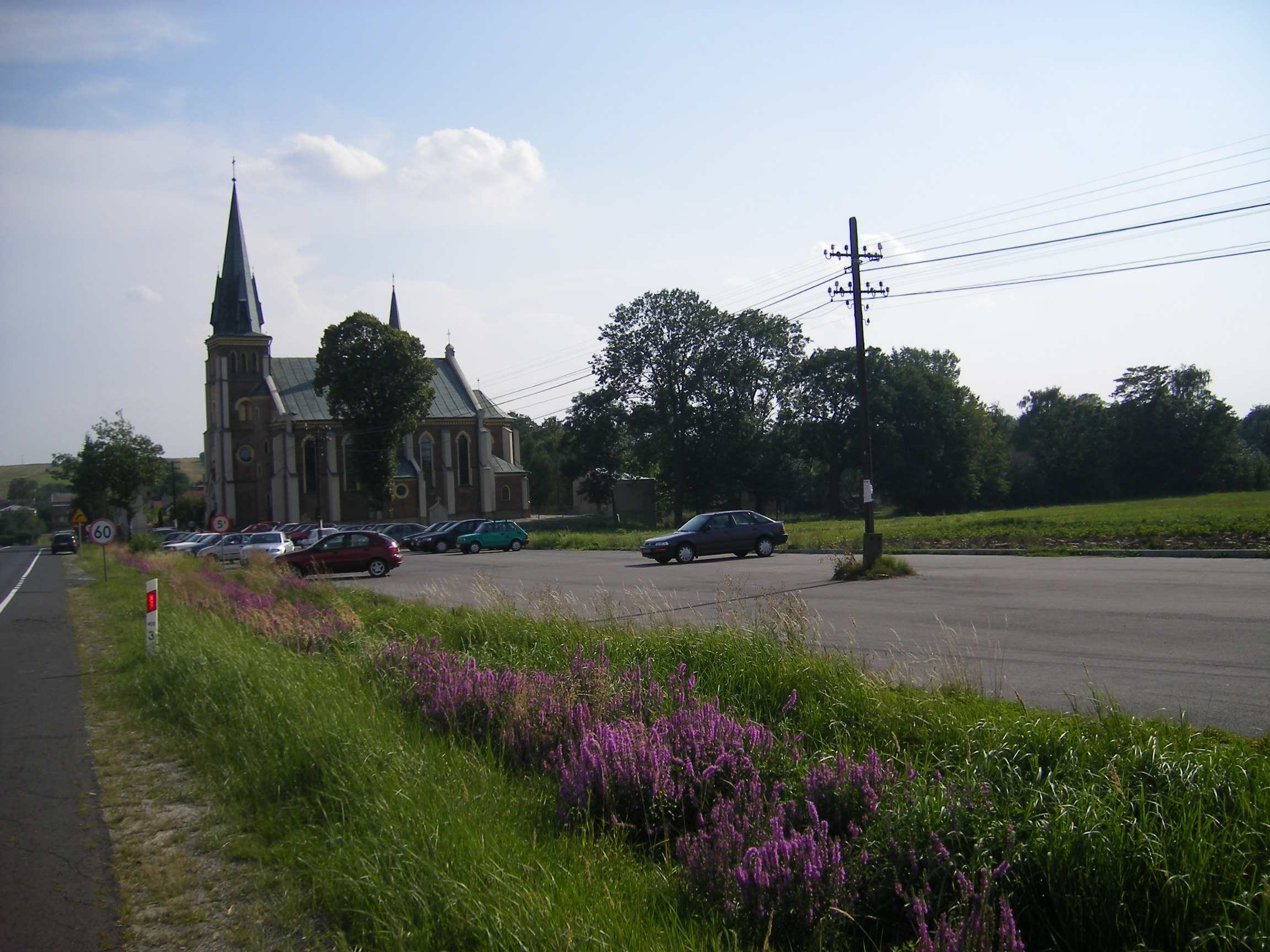

- Location within Poland
- Coordinates: 50°11′36″N 22°6′15″E
- Country: Poland
- Voivodeship: Subcarpathian
- County: Rzeszów
- Gmina: Sokołów Małopolski

Nienadówka [ɲɛnaˈdufka] is a village in the administrative district of Gmina Sokołów Małopolski, within Rzeszów County, Subcarpathian Voivodeship, in south-eastern Poland.
