= Futoma =

- Village
- Location within Poland
- Coordinates: 49°51′N 22°8′E
- Country: Poland
- Voivodeship: Subcarpathian
- County: Rzeszów
- Gmina: Błażowa
- Population: 1,400
- Website: http://www.futoma.info

Futoma ([fuˈtɔma]) is a village in the administrative district of Gmina Błażowa, within Rzeszów County, Subcarpathian Voivodeship, in south-eastern Poland.
