= Piątkowa, Rzeszów County =

Piątkowa
- Village
- Location within Poland
- Coordinates: 49°53′23″N 22°9′18″E
- Country: Poland
- Voivodeship: Subcarpathian
- County: Rzeszów
- Gmina: Błażowa
- Population: 960

Piątkowa [pjɔntˈkɔva] is a village in the administrative district of Gmina Błażowa, within Rzeszów County, Subcarpathian Voivodeship, in southeastern Poland.
