= Strażów =

- Village
- Location within Poland
- Coordinates: 50°4′N 22°7′E
- Country: Poland
- Voivodeship: Subcarpathian
- County: Rzeszów
- Gmina: Krasne
- Population: 1,400

Strażów [ˈstraʐuf] is a village in the administrative district of Gmina Krasne, within Rzeszów County, Subcarpathian Voivodeship, in south-eastern Poland.
