= Lecka =

- Village
- Location within Poland
- Coordinates: 49°52′N 22°0′E
- Country: Poland
- Voivodeship: Subcarpathian
- County: Rzeszów
- Gmina: Błażowa

Lecka [ˈlɛt͡ska] is a village in the administrative district of Gmina Błażowa, within Rzeszów County, Subcarpathian Voivodeship, in south-eastern Poland.
