= Wólka Hyżneńska =

- Village
- Location within Poland
- Coordinates: 49°55′16″N 22°12′49″E
- Country: Poland
- Voivodeship: Subcarpathian
- County: Rzeszów
- Gmina: Hyżne

Wólka Hyżneńska [ˈvulka xɨʐˈnɛɲska] is a village in the administrative district of Gmina Hyżne, within Rzeszów County, Subcarpathian Voivodeship, in south-eastern Poland.
