= Łowisko, Podkarpackie Voivodeship =

Łowisko
- Village
- Location within Poland
- Coordinates: 50°18′6″N 22°11′0″E
- Country: Poland
- Voivodeship: Subcarpathian
- County: Rzeszów
- Gmina: Kamień

Łowisko [wɔˈviskɔ] is a village in the administrative district of Gmina Kamień, within Rzeszów County, Subcarpathian Voivodeship, in south-eastern Poland.
