= Kąty Trzebuskie =

- Village
- Location within Poland
- Coordinates: 50°13′11″N 22°8′53″E
- Country: Poland
- Voivodeship: Subcarpathian
- County: Rzeszów
- Gmina: Sokołów Małopolski

Kąty Trzebuskie [ˈkɔntɨ tʂɛˈbuskʲɛ] is a village in the administrative district of Gmina Sokołów Małopolski, within Rzeszów County, Subcarpathian Voivodeship, in south-eastern Poland.
