= Krasne, Rzeszów County =

Krasne
- Village
- Location within Poland
- Coordinates: 50°2′57″N 22°5′26″E
- Country: Poland
- Voivodeship: Subcarpathian
- County: Rzeszów
- Gmina: Krasne
- Population: 3,500

Krasne [ˈkrasnɛ] is a village in Rzeszów County, Subcarpathian Voivodeship, in south-eastern Poland. It is the seat of the gmina (administrative district) called Gmina Krasne.
