= Trzeboś =

- Village
- Location within Poland
- Coordinates: 50°12′N 22°9′E
- Country: Poland
- Voivodeship: Subcarpathian
- County: Rzeszów
- Gmina: Sokołów Małopolski

Trzeboś [ˈtʂɛbɔɕ] is a village in the administrative district of Gmina Sokołów Małopolski, within Rzeszów County, Subcarpathian Voivodeship, in south-eastern Poland.
