= Gmina Sokołów Małopolski =

Gmina Sokołów Małopolski Sokołów Małopolski Commune
- Gmina
- Coat of arms
- Interactive map of Gmina Sokołów Małopolski
- Coordinates (Sokołów Małopolski): 50°13′57″N 22°7′15″E
- Country: Poland
- Voivodeship: Subcarpathian
- County: Rzeszów County
- Seat: Sokołów Małopolski

Area
  - Total: 134.04 km^{2} (51.75 sq mi)

Population (2006)
  - Total: 16,459
  - Density: 122.79/km^{2} (318.03/sq mi)
  - Urban: 3,991
  - Rural: 12,468
- Website: http://www.sokolow-mlp.pl

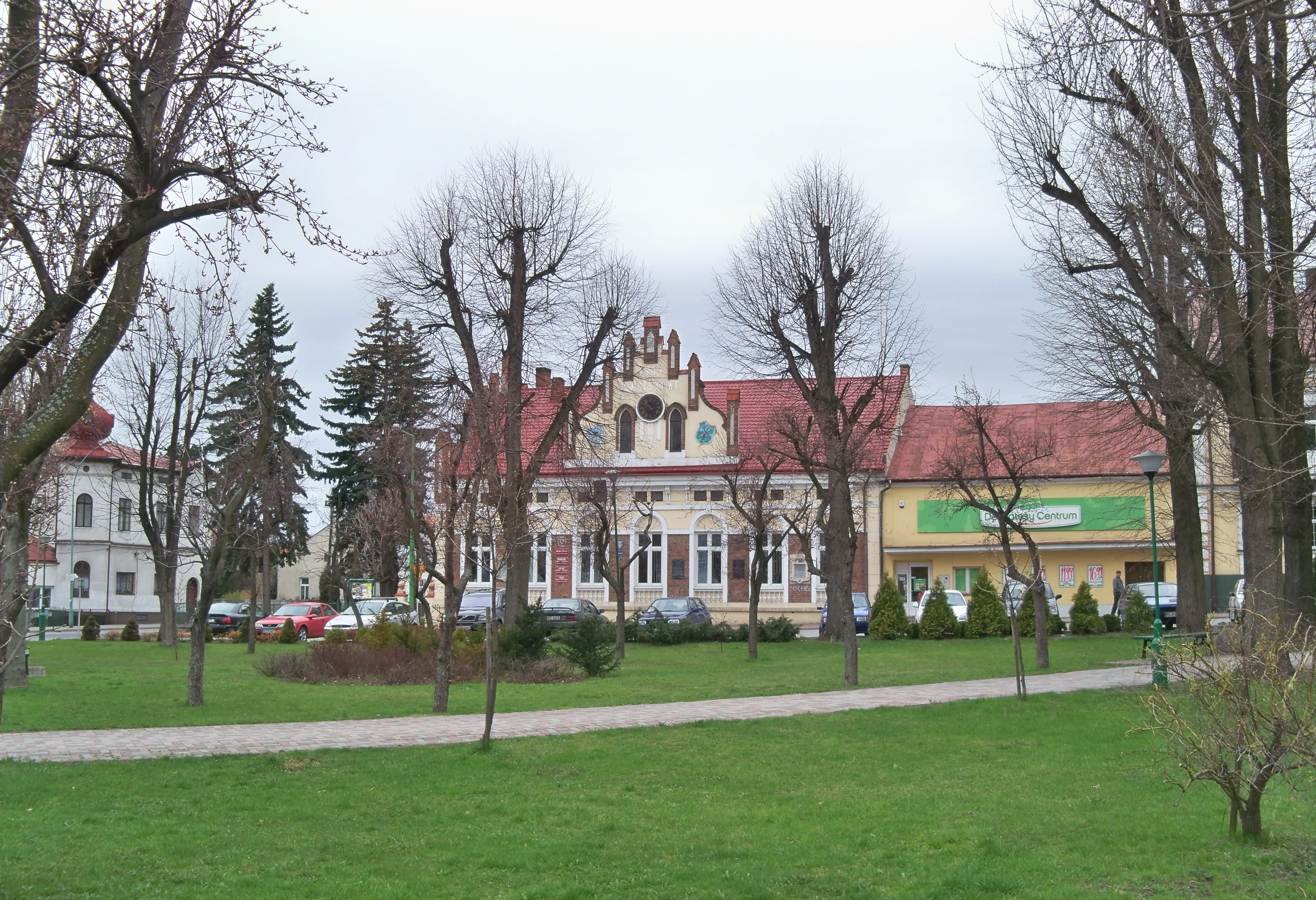
Sokołów Małopolski park i magistrat

Gmina Sokołów Małopolski is an urban-rural gmina (administrative district) in Rzeszów County, Subcarpathian Voivodeship, in south-eastern Poland. Its seat is the town of Sokołów Małopolski, which lies approximately 24 kilometres (15 mi) north of the regional capital Rzeszów.

The gmina covers an area of 134.04 square kilometres (51.8 sq mi), and as of 2006 its total population is 16,459 (out of which the population of Sokołów Małopolski amounts to 3,991, and the population of the rural part of the gmina is 12,468).

== Villages ==
Apart from the town of Sokołów Małopolski, Gmina Sokołów Małopolski contains the villages and settlements of Górno, Kąty Trzebuskie, Markowizna, Nienadówka, Trzeboś, Trzebuska, Turza, Wólka Niedźwiedzka and Wólka Sokołowska.

== Neighbouring gminas ==
Gmina Sokołów Małopolski is bordered by the gminas of Czarna, Głogów Małopolski, Kamień, Leżajsk, Nowa Sarzyna, Rakszawa, Raniżów and Trzebownisko.
