= Chmielnik, Podkarpackie Voivodeship =

Chmielnik
- Village
- Location within Poland
- Coordinates: 49°58′26″N 22°8′44″E
- Country: Poland
- Voivodeship: Subcarpathian
- County: Rzeszów
- Gmina: Chmielnik
- Population: 3,466
- Website: https://www.chmielnik.pl/

Chmielnik ([ˈxmjɛlnik]) is a village in Rzeszów County, Subcarpathian Voivodeship, in south-eastern Poland. It is the seat of the gmina (administrative district) called Gmina Chmielnik.
