= Nowy Borek, Podkarpackie Voivodeship =

Nowy Borek
- Village
- Location within Poland
- Coordinates: 49°55′23″N 22°5′6″E
- Country: Poland
- Voivodeship: Subcarpathian
- County: Rzeszów
- Gmina: Błażowa

Nowy Borek [ˈnɔvɨ ˈbɔrɛk] is a village in the administrative district of Gmina Błażowa, within Rzeszów County, Subcarpathian Voivodeship, in southeastern Poland.
