= Hyżne =

- Village
- Location within Poland
- Coordinates: 49°56′N 22°11′E
- Country: Poland
- Voivodeship: Subcarpathian
- County: Rzeszów
- Gmina: Hyżne
- Established: 15th century
- Population: 3,900
- Postal code: 36-024
- Website: http://www.hyzne.pl

Hyżne ([ˈxɨʐnɛ]) is a village in Rzeszów County, Subcarpathian Voivodeship, in south-eastern Poland. It is the seat of the gmina (administrative district) called Gmina Hyżne.
