= Górno, Podkarpackie Voivodeship =

Górno
- Village
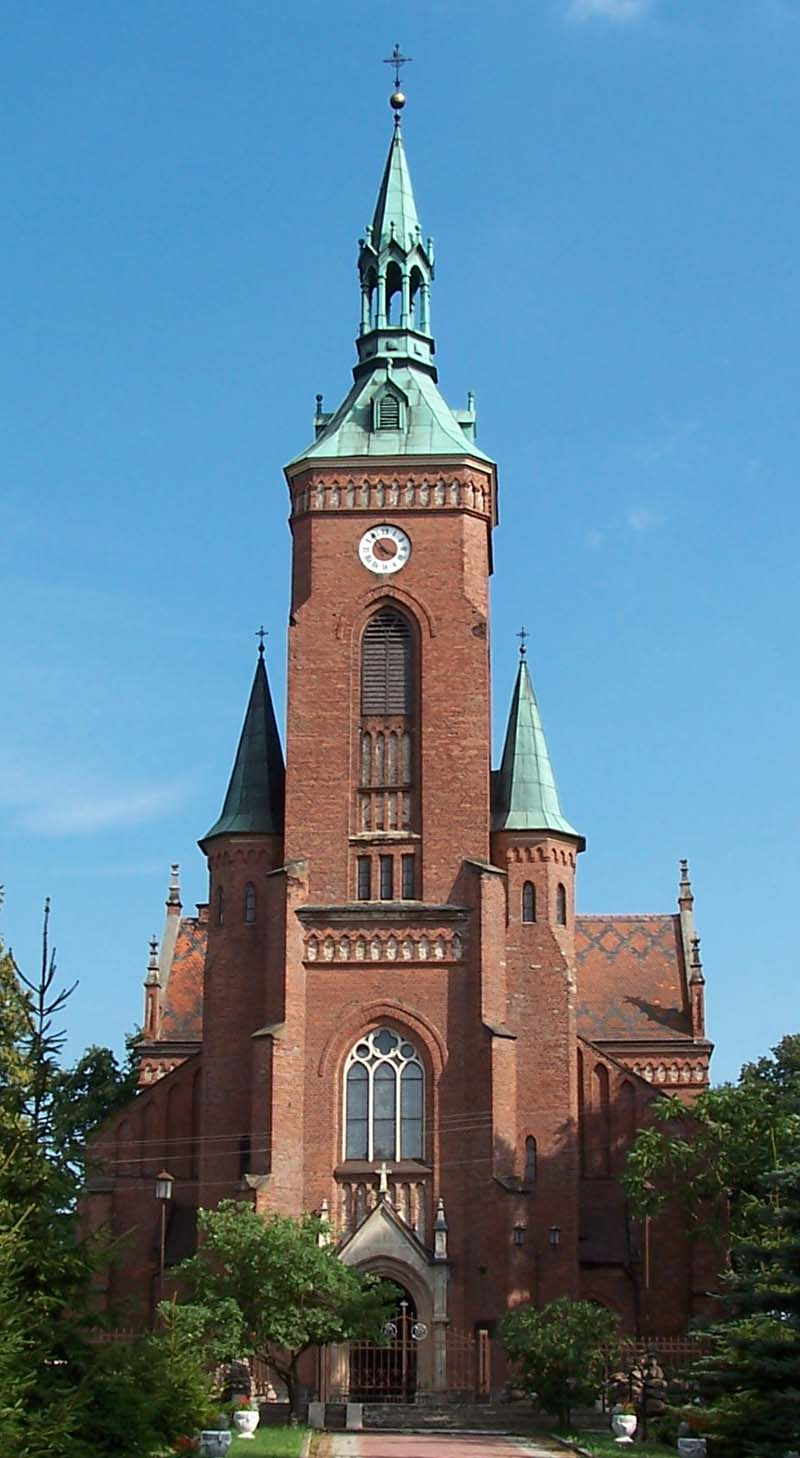
- The Church of the Sacrifice of Our Lady

- Location within Poland
- Coordinates: 50°16′52″N 22°08′54″E
- Country: Poland
- Voivodeship: Subcarpathian
- County: Rzeszów
- Gmina: Sokołów Małopolski
- Elevation: 220 m (720 ft)
- Population: 2,142

Górno ([ˈɡurnɔ]) is a village in the administrative district of Gmina Sokołów Małopolski, within Rzeszów County, Subcarpathian Voivodeship, in south-eastern Poland.

== History ==
The area of Górno (The Sandomierska Valley) was first settled around 6'500 B.C. by unknown tribes, However we do know around 400 B.C. the region was settled by the Celtic La Tène Culture. Then later settled by Germanic Tribes such as the Goths, Who left and got pushed out of the area around 500 A.D. Balto-Slavic Tribes who started settling in the area. The Germanic populations were either absorbed into the Slavs or left. The Slavic Tribes ended up dividing in their sub-groups, Specifically the region Górno was settled by the Lechitic Vistulan Tribe and White Croats tribe. This land was Annexed by the first Polish Duke, Mieszko I a little after Poland's creation in 966. The location of Górno was under Polish rule (Duchy of Poland, Kingdom of Poland, and Polish Lithuanian Commonwealth) all the way from its creation around Circa.1550 and beyond. Górno under Polish rule till the late 17th Century when the Polish-Lithuanian Commonwealth met its demise and was partitioned by three empires (Russian Empire, Austrian Empire, and The Kingdom of Prussia) over the span of a few decades. The region Górno was in specifically was annexed by the Austrian Empire in 1772, and became the Galicia Region of the Austrian Empire. In the center of the town you can still find architecture from this time under Austrian rule from 1772 to 1918. Such as the church pictured on the right, Built in 1911. During this time there was also some of Górno's Citizens who immigrated to the United States to states such as Wisconsin, New Jersey, Rhode Island, Pennsylvania, Massachusetts, and probably more. Górno became part of the Second Polish Republic in 1918 when Poland gained its Independence once again rising from almost a 100 years of being suppressed. Górno became a part of Nazi Occupied Poland when Germany invaded where it served as a Luftwaffe camp. Górno was eventually "Liberated" in the 40's by the Soviet Army. In 1947 it became a part of the Communist Soviet Puppet-State, the Polish People's Republic. It stayed under this control till 1989 when the Communist Regime was overthrown. Górno now rests in modern Southeastern Poland as a small community with farms, rolling hills, vast forests, and surrounded with green mountains.
