= Gmina Błażowa =

Gmina Błażowa Błażowa Commune
- Gmina
- Coat of arms
- Interactive map of Gmina Błażowa
- Coordinates (Błażowa): 49°54′N 22°6′E
- Country: Poland
- Voivodeship: Subcarpathian
- County: Rzeszów County
- Seat: Błażowa

Area
  - Total: 112.7 km^{2} (43.5 sq mi)

Population (2006)
  - Total: 10,593
  - Density: 93.99/km^{2} (243.4/sq mi)
  - Urban: 2,110
  - Rural: 8,483
- Website: http://www.blazowa.itl.pl/index1.htm

Gmina Błażowa is an urban-rural gmina (administrative district) in Rzeszów County, Subcarpathian Voivodeship, in south-eastern Poland. Its seat is the town of Błażowa, which lies approximately 17 kilometres (11 mi) south-east of the regional capital Rzeszów.

The gmina covers an area of 112.7 square kilometres (43.5 sq mi), and as of 2006 its total population is 10,593, of which the population of Błażowa is 2,110, and the population of the rural part of the gmina is 8,483.

== Villages ==
Apart from the town of Błażowa, Gmina Błażowa contains the villages and settlements of Białka, Błażowa Dolna, Błażowa Górna, Futoma, Kąkolówka, Lecka, Mokłuczka, Nowy Borek, Piątkowa and Ujazdy.

== Neighbouring gminas ==
Gmina Błażowa is bordered by the gminas of Domaradz, Dynów, Hyżne, Lubenia, Niebylec, Nozdrzec and Tyczyn.
