= Church of St. Joseph, Kraków (Podgórze) =

Roman Catholic church in Kraków, Poland

Church of St. Joseph
- Kościół św. Józefa
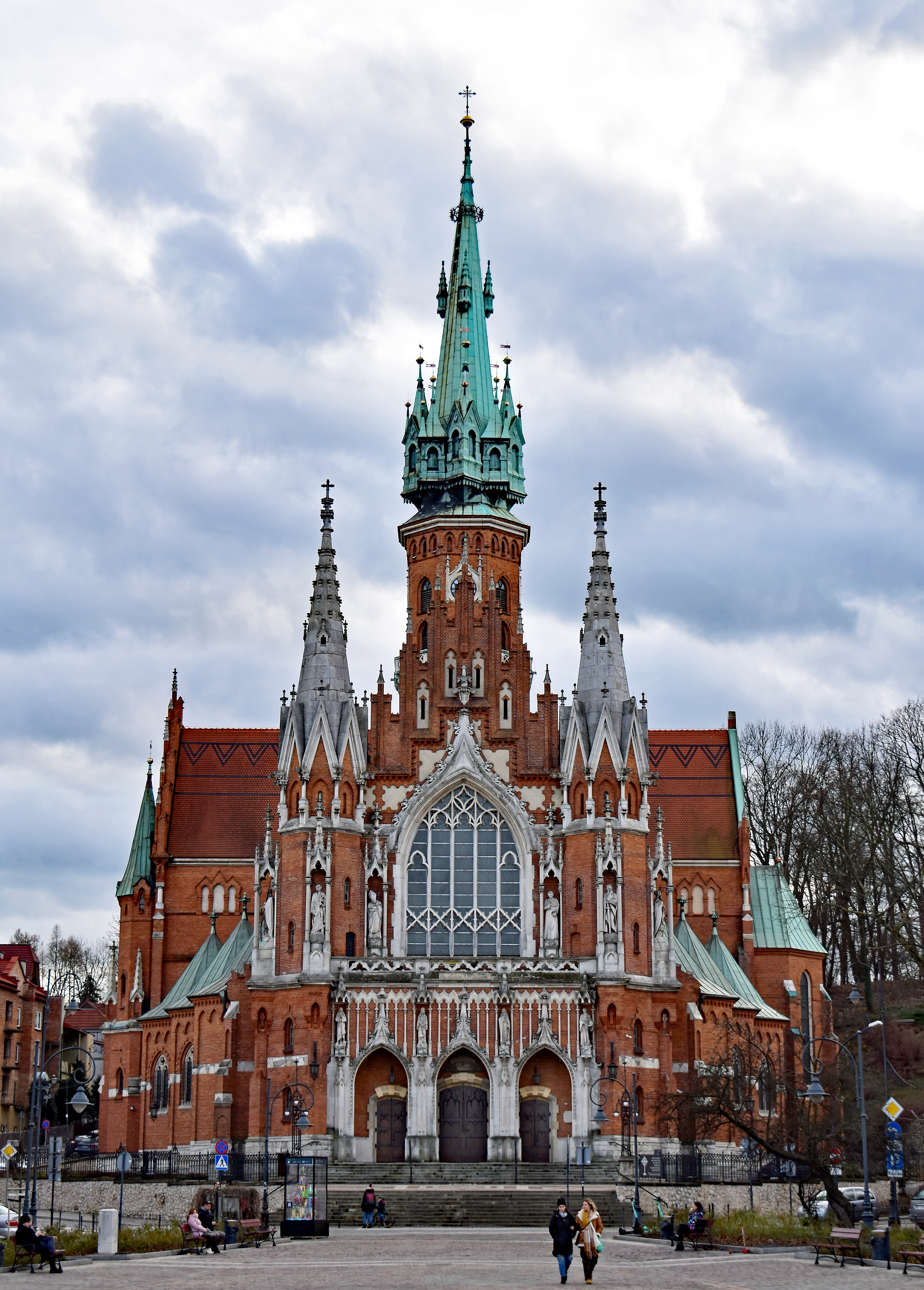
- Church of St. Joseph
- 50°02′36″N 19°56′59.5″E
- Location: Kraków
- Address: 2 Jana Zamoyskiego Street
- Country: Poland
- Denomination: Roman Catholic

History
- Consecrated

Historic Monument of Poland
- Designated: 1994-09-08
- Part of: Kraków historical city complex
- Reference no.: M.P. 1994 nr 50 poz. 418

Church of St. Joseph (Polish: Kościół św. Józefa) is a historic Roman Catholic parish church located at 2 Jana Zamoyskiego Street (in the southern frontage of the Podgórski Market Square) in Podgórze, the former district of Kraków, Poland.

== History ==
=== The first church of St. Joseph in Podgórze ===
The first parish church, dedicated to St. Joseph, was built at Podgórski Market Square, according to the design of Franciszek Brotschneider in collaboration with Franciszek Ripper and Franciszek von Pierret. Construction lasted until 1833, when the church was consecrated. In 1879, a freestanding tower was added. By the end of the 19th century, the church had become too small for its parish and its physical condition was deteriorating. Consequently, in 1905, the church was razed and the current Church of St. Joseph began to take shape.

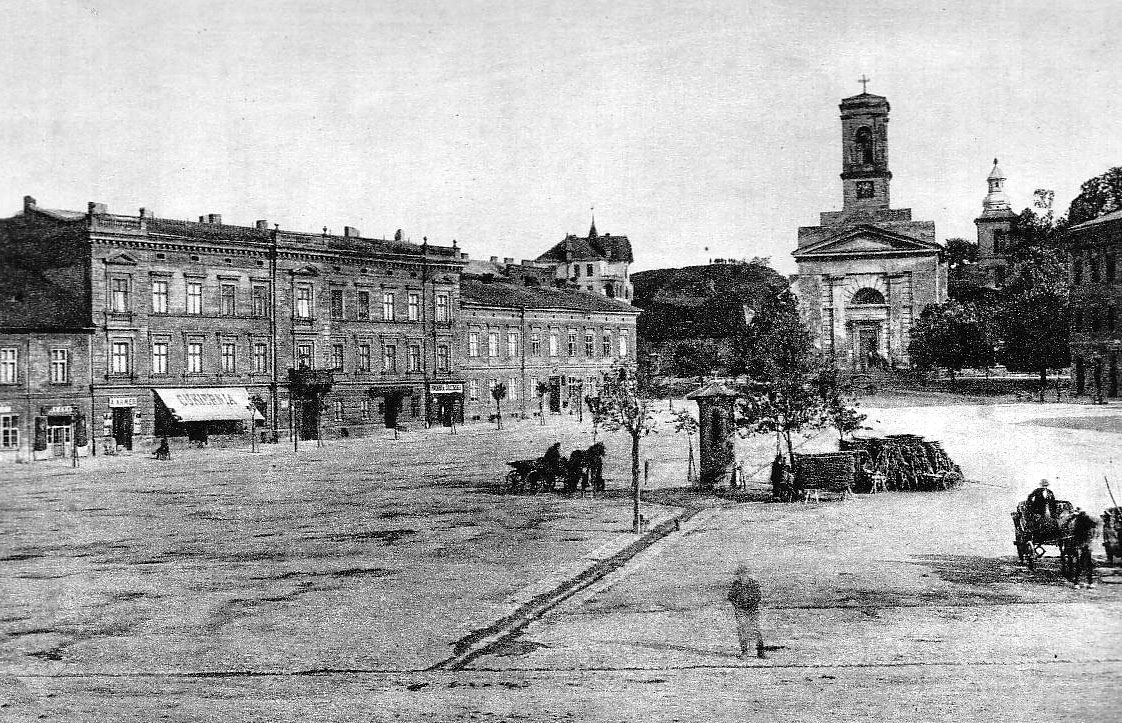
Podgórski Market Square with the first church of St. Joseph at back, c. late 1800s.

=== The second church of St. Joseph ===
The church was built between 1905 and 1909, and designed by Jan Sas-Zubrzycki in the Gothic Revival style. It is the largest church in the area.

The interior of the church is shaped in the likeness of a Gothic cathedral in the so-called Gothic Vistula (Brick Gothic) style. It is filled with numerous altars, benches and other items made mostly of wood. Work on the fittings lasted for years.

In the post-World War II period, the locations of some of the altars and pulpits were changed, as well as a bricked arcade between an ambulatory and the former chapel of the Sacred Heart (now Our Lady of Perpetual Help and Eternal Adoration). The altars created first were the main chapel (in the sanctuary) and the Annunciation (formerly in the right arm of the transept). Work on them was from 1908 to 1909.

The main altar originally consisted of the tabernacle and statues of Saint Joseph. In the main altar in the west arm of the transept stands the altar of the Annunciation. There are five other main altars.

== Restoration ==
In 1999, the local parish priest, Franciszek Kołacz, decided the church needed restoration. The main altar, side altars, pulpit and organ were renovated. It was also restored to its original colour, which was lost during renovations at the time of pastor Franciszek Mirek, when the colour was changed to red-blue which severely affected the appearance of the church. Today the church has a white-gray colour which has restored it to its former character.

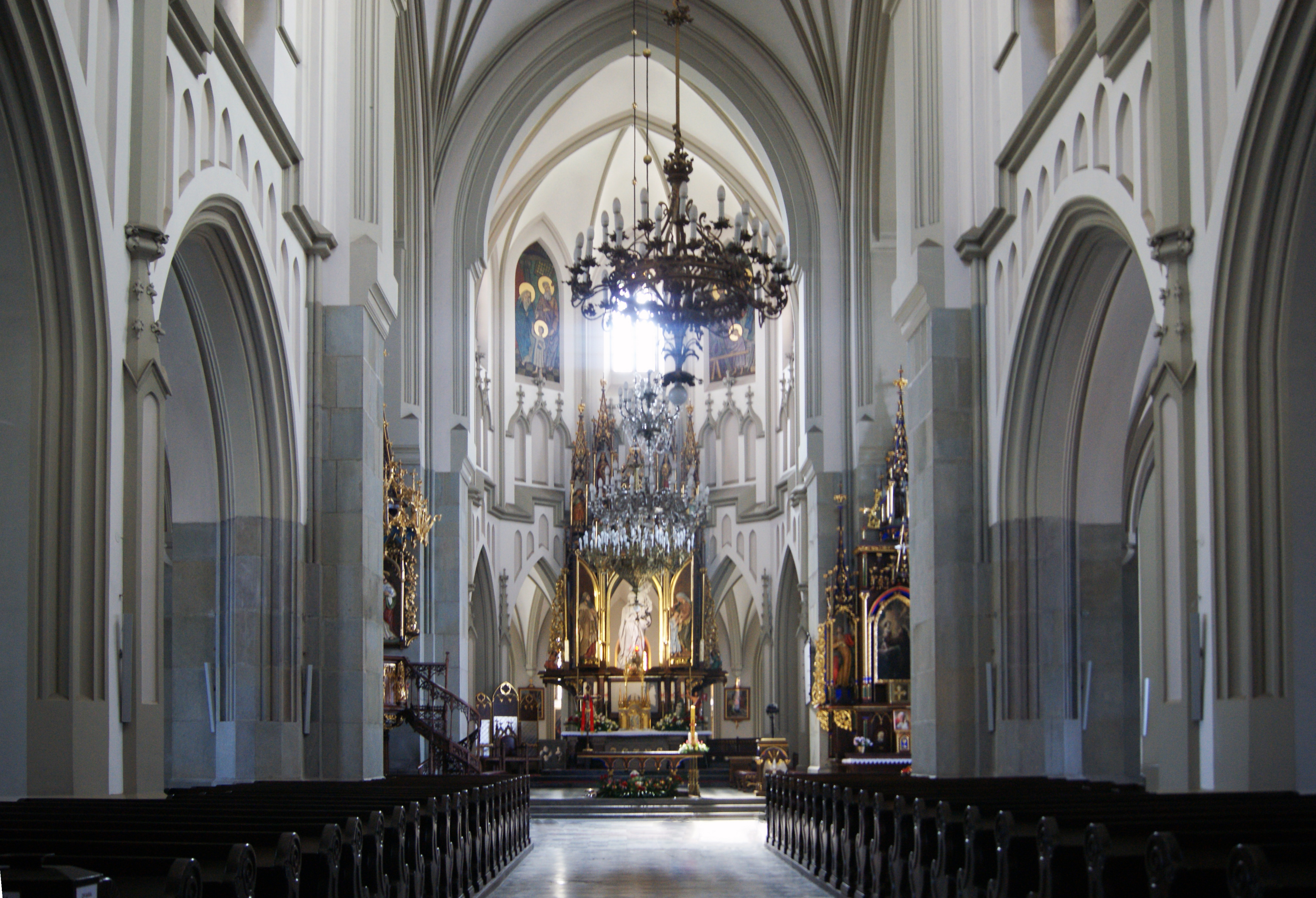
The interior of the church

== Bibliography ==
- (in Polish) * Michał Rożek, Barbara Gądkowa Leksykon kościołów Krakowa, Wydawnictwo Verso, Kraków 2003, ISBN 83-919281-0-1 pp. 64-65 (Lexicon of Kraków churches)
- (in Polish) * Praca zbiorowa Encyklopedia Krakowa, wydawca Biblioteka Kraków i Muzeum Krakowa, Kraków 2023, ISBN 978-83-66253-46-9 volume I page 747 (Encyclopedia of Kraków)
