= Kamień, Podkarpackie Voivodeship =

Kamień
- Village
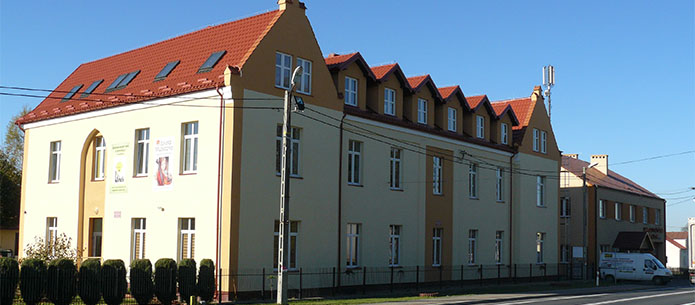
- School in Kamień

- Location within Poland
- Coordinates: 50°19′25″N 22°8′17″E
- Country: Poland
- Voivodeship: Subcarpathian
- County: Rzeszów
- Gmina: Kamień
- Population (2021): 4,484

Kamień (Polish pronunciation: [ˈkamjɛj̃]) is a village located in Gmina Kamień, Rzeszów County, Subcarpathian Voivodeship, in south-eastern Poland.

== History ==
The village was founded by Stephen Báthory in 1578. At the time, it was part of the Sandomierz Voivodeship. However, the oldest traces to human settlement in the area date back between 10,000–8,000 BC.

In 1783, during the Josephine colonization, German colonists of Lutheran and Reformed denominations settled here. The colony was named Steinau, a direct translation of the Polish name, Kamień, with the -au suffix. It was part of an independent municipality.

In 1900, the total population of the municipality was 5,112 people with 885 houses. All inhabitants spoke Polish, excluding 25 who spoke German. 4,869 out of 5,112 inhabitants were Roman Catholic, 226 were Jewish, 2 were Greek Catholic and 25 were part of a different religion or atheist. The Roman Catholic parish was established in 1907.

After the end of World War I and the collapse of Imperial and Royal, Kamień became part of Poland.

In 1921, the total population of the municipality was 4,703 people, with 891 houses. All except 2 inhabitants were Polish. 4,499 out of 4,703 inhabitants were Roman Catholic, 201 were Jewish, 2 were Greek Catholic and 1 person was Protestant.

During World War II, the village was part of the Kraków District which was administered by the General Government.
