= Gmina Hyżne =

Gmina Hyżne Hyżne Commune
- Gmina
- Flag Coat of arms
- Interactive map of Gmina Hyżne
- Coordinates (Hyżne): 49°56′N 22°11′E
- Country: Poland
- Voivodeship: Subcarpathian
- County: Rzeszów County
- Seat: Hyżne

Area
  - Total: 50.98 km^{2} (19.68 sq mi)

Population (2006)
  - Total: 6,811
  - Density: 133.6/km^{2} (346.0/sq mi)
- Website: http://www.hyzne.pl/

Gmina Hyżne is a rural gmina (administrative district) in Rzeszów County, Subcarpathian Voivodeship, in south-eastern Poland. Its seat is the village of Hyżne, which lies approximately 17 kilometres (11 mi) south-east of the regional capital Rzeszów.

The gmina covers an area of 50.98 square kilometres (19.7 sq mi), and as of 2006 its total population is 6,811.

== Villages ==
Gmina Hyżne contains the villages and settlements of Brzezówka, Dylągówka, Grzegorzówka, Hyżne, Nieborów, Szklary and Wólka Hyżneńska.

== Neighbouring gminas ==
Gmina Hyżne is bordered by the gminas of Błażowa, Chmielnik, Dynów, Jawornik Polski, Markowa and Tyczyn.
