= Gmina Krasne, Podkarpackie Voivodeship =

Gmina Krasne Krasne Commune
- Gmina
- Coat of arms
- Interactive map of Gmina Krasne
- Coordinates (Krasne): 50°2′57″N 22°5′26″E
- Country: Poland
- Voivodeship: Subcarpathian
- County: Rzeszów County
- Seat: Krasne

Area
  - Total: 39.4 km^{2} (15.2 sq mi)

Population (2006)
  - Total: 9,576
  - Density: 243/km^{2} (629/sq mi)
- Website: http://www.gmina-krasne.un.pl

Gmina Krasne is a rural gmina (administrative district) in Rzeszów County, Subcarpathian Voivodeship, in south-eastern Poland. Its seat is the village of Krasne, which lies approximately 7 kilometres (4 mi) east of the regional capital Rzeszów.

The gmina covers an area of 39.4 square kilometres (15.2 sq mi), and as of 2006 its total population is 9,576.

== Villages ==
Gmina Krasne contains the villages and settlements of Krasne, Malawa, Palikówka and Strażów.

== Neighbouring gminas ==
Gmina Krasne is bordered by the gminas of Chmielnik, Czarna, Łańcut and Trzebownisko.
