= Gmina Tyczyn =

Gmina Tyczyn Tyczyn Commune
- Gmina
- Flag Coat of arms
- Interactive map of Gmina Tyczyn
- Coordinates (Tyczyn): 49°58′N 22°2′E
- Country: Poland
- Voivodeship: Subcarpathian
- County: Rzeszów County
- Seat: Tyczyn

Area
  - Total: 53.71 km^{2} (20.74 sq mi)

Population (2006)
  - Total: 16,302
  - Density: 303.5/km^{2} (786.1/sq mi)
  - Urban: 3,299
  - Rural: 13,003
- Website: http://www.tyczyn.pl/

Gmina Tyczyn is an urban-rural gmina (administrative district) in Rzeszów County, Subcarpathian Voivodeship, in south-eastern Poland. Its seat is the town of Tyczyn, which lies approximately 8 kilometres (5 mi) south of the regional capital Rzeszów.

The gmina covers an area of 82.44 square kilometres (31.8 sq mi), and as of 2006 its total population is 16,302 (out of which the population of Tyczyn amounts to 3,299, and the population of the rural part of the gmina is 13,003).

== Villages ==
Apart from the town of Tyczyn, Gmina Tyczyn contains the villages and settlements of Borek Stary, Hermanowa, Kielnarowa .

== Neighbouring gminas ==
Gmina Tyczyn is bordered by the gminas of Błażowa, Boguchwała, Chmielnik, Hyżne and Lubenia.
