= Gmina Chmielnik, Podkarpackie Voivodeship =

Gmina Chmielnik Chmielnik Commune
- Gmina
- Interactive map of Gmina Chmielnik
- Coordinates (Chmielnik): 49°58′26″N 22°8′44″E
- Country: Poland
- Voivodeship: Subcarpathian
- County: Rzeszów County
- Seat: Chmielnik

Area
  - Total: 52.87 km^{2} (20.41 sq mi)

Population (2006)
  - Total: 6,391
  - Density: 120.9/km^{2} (313.1/sq mi)
- Website: http://www.chmielnik.pl/

Gmina Chmielnik is a rural gmina (administrative district) in Rzeszów County, Subcarpathian Voivodeship, in south-eastern Poland. Its seat is the village of Chmielnik, which lies approximately 13 kilometres (8 mi) south-east of the regional capital Rzeszów.

The gmina covers an area of 52.87 square kilometres (20.4 sq mi), and as of 2006 its total population is 6,391.

== Villages ==
Gmina Chmielnik contains the villages and settlements of Błędowa Tyczyńska, Borówki, Chmielnik, Wola Rafałowska and Zabratówka.

== Neighbouring gminas ==
Gmina Chmielnik is bordered by the gminas of Hyżne, Krasne, Łańcut, Markowa and Tyczyn.
