= Sokołów Małopolski =

Town in Subcarpathian Voivodeship, Poland

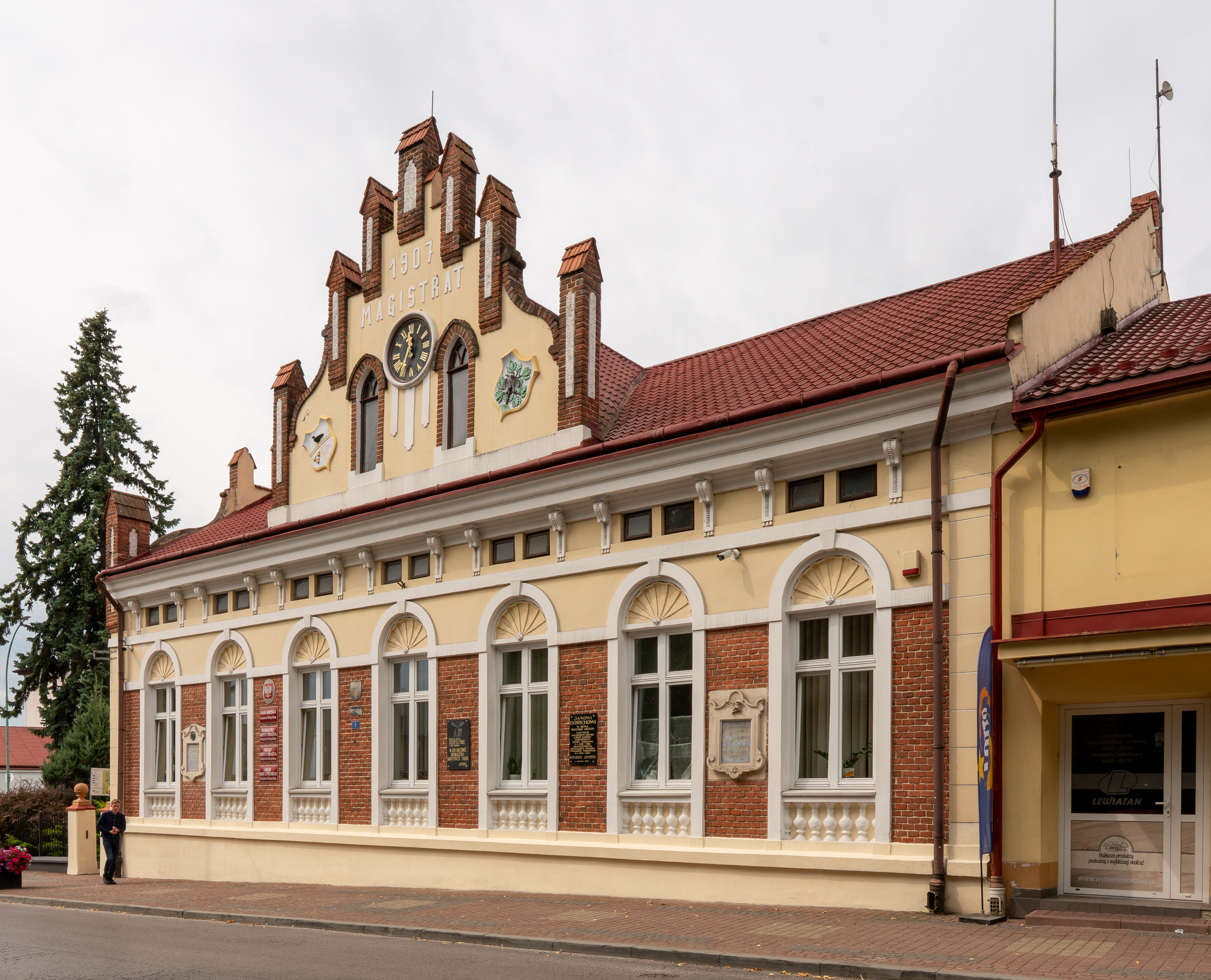
- Town hall

- Coat of arms

- Location within Poland
- Coordinates: 50°13′57″N 22°7′15″E
- Country: Poland
- Voivodeship: Subcarpathian
- County: Rzeszów
- Gmina: Sokołów Małopolski
- Town rights: 1569

Government
  - Mayor: Andrzej Kraska (PiS)

Area
  - Total: 15.55 km^{2} (6.00 sq mi)

Population (2005)
  - Total: 4,046
  - Density: 260.2/km^{2} (673.9/sq mi)
- Time zone: UTC+1 (CET)
  - Summer (DST): UTC+2 (CEST)
- Postal code: 36-050
- Vehicle registration: RZE
- Primary airport: Rzeszów–Jasionka Airport
- Website: http://www.sokolow-mlp.pl

Sokołów Małopolski [sɔˈkɔwuf mawɔˈpɔlskʲi] is a town in Rzeszów County, Subcarpathian Voivodeship, in south-eastern Poland, with a population of 3,962 (2 June 2009).

== Geography ==
Sokołów Małopolski lies in Sandomierz Basin, 24 kilometers north of Rzeszow, and 11 kilometers from Rzeszów–Jasionka Airport.

== History ==
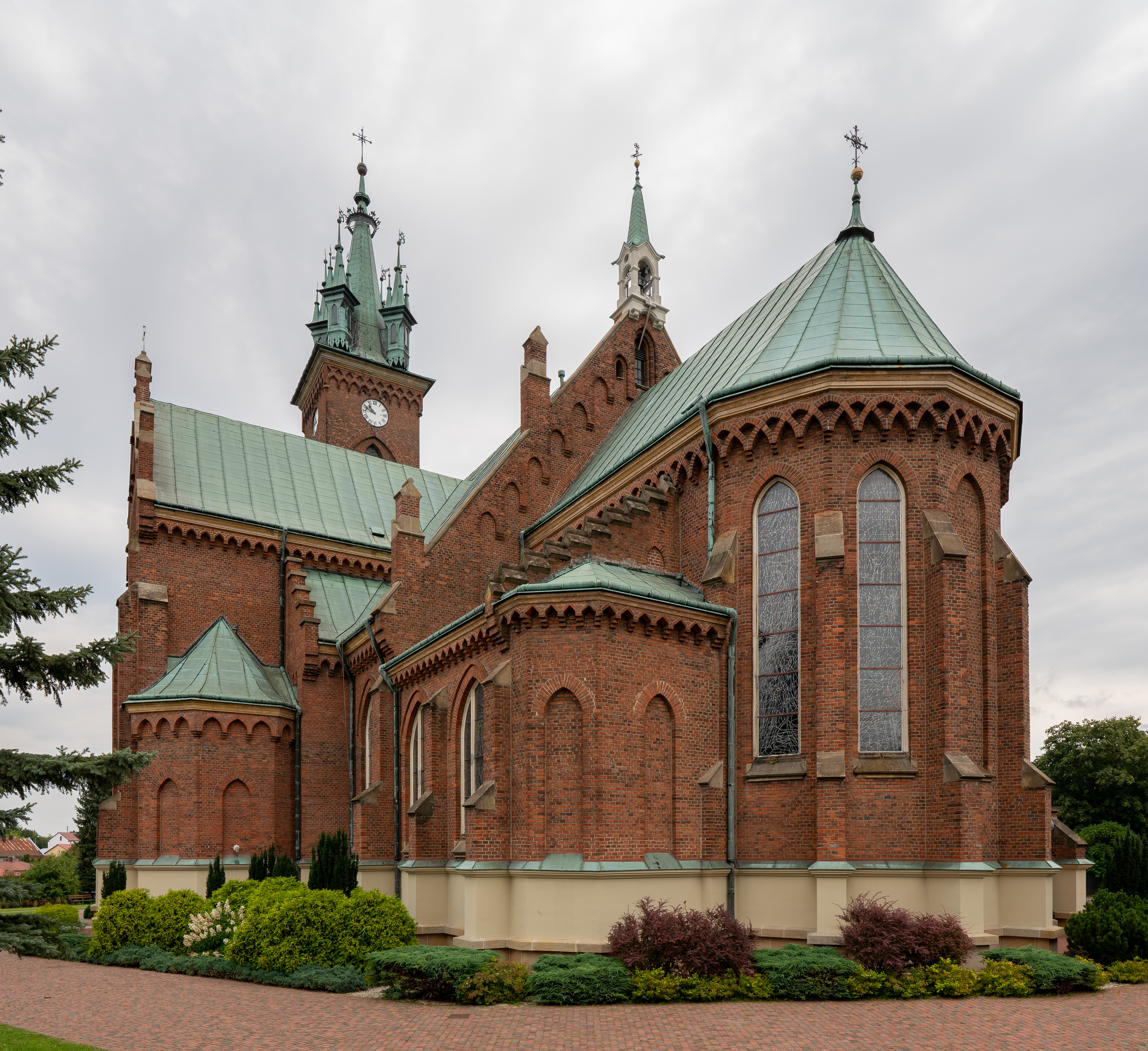
Saint John church

The history of Sokołów Małopolski starts with a forest settlement, located in once extensive Sandomierz Forest, which the sources describe as far as the 14th century. In the 15th century, it became part of the estate of the Pilecki noble family. In 1569, Sokołów received a town charter, with a Renaissance street plan and a market square in the centre. In 1608, the town was looted by Stanisław Stadnicki, a well-known troublemaker and the so-called “Devil of Łańcut”, but after this incident, Sokołów continued to prosper. In 1657, during the Swedish invasion of Poland, Sokołów was destroyed by Transilvanian army of George II Rakoczi. In the 17th century, the town was protected by fortifications with five gates and a moat.

Following the First Partition of Poland, Sokołów was in 1772 annexed by the Habsburg Empire, and remained in Austrian Galicia until late 1918. The town burned in fires in 1863 and 1904, and did not prosper. In the Second Polish Republic, Sokolow belonged to Lwów Voivodeship, and even though it was located in the Central Industrial Region, no plant was opened here, and the promised rail line was not built.

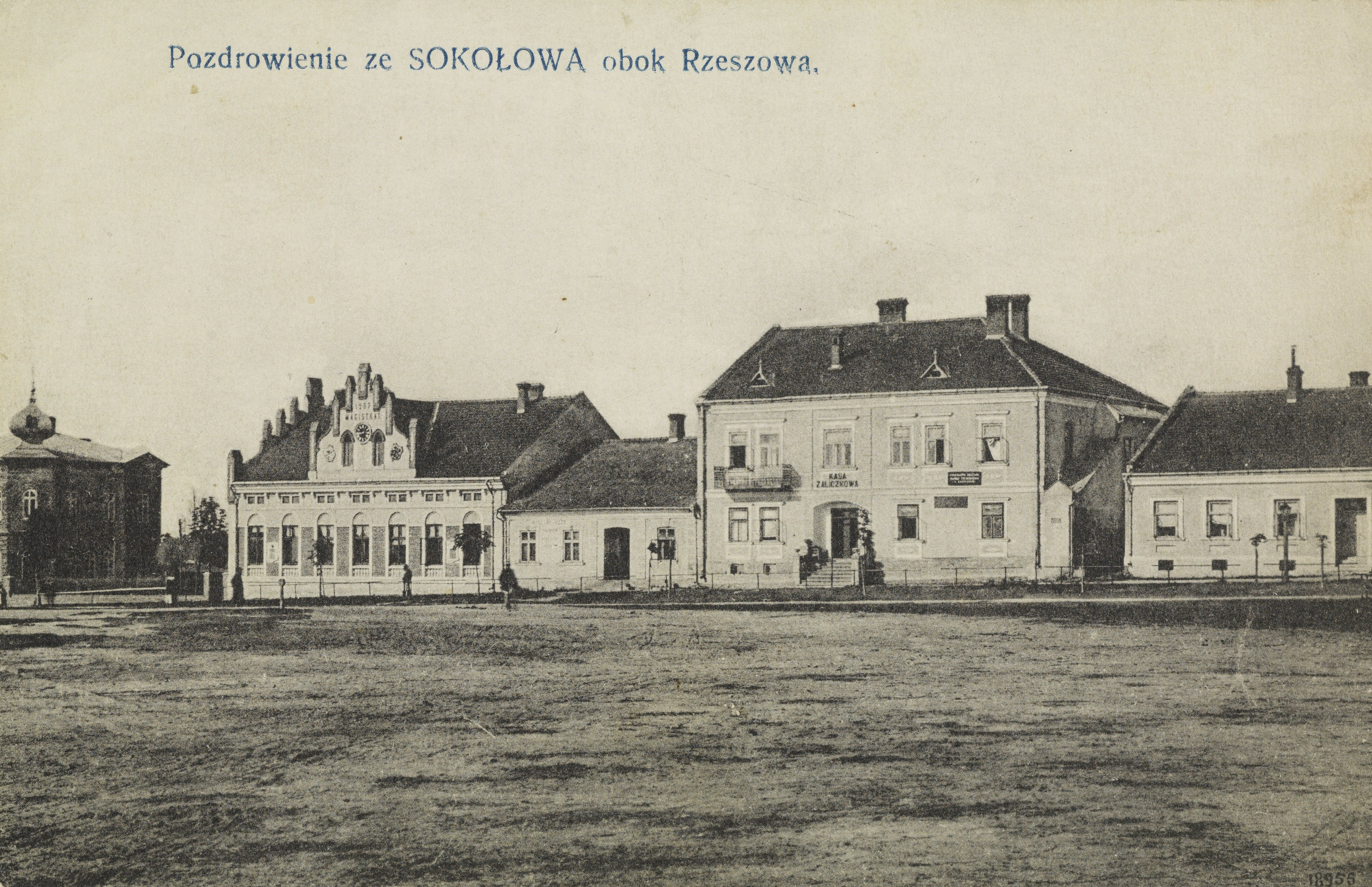
Market square, ca 1905-1918

Following the German-Soviet invasion of Poland, which started World War II in September 1939, the town was occupied by Germany. Several Poles who were either born or lived and worked in Sokołów Małopolski, were murdered by the Russians in the Katyn massacre in 1940. At the start of the war, Sokołów Małopolski's Jewish population was about 1,600. The Germans immediately requisitioned Jews for forced labor. In April 1942, the Jewish population, then numbering 3,000 because of refugees and others resettled by the Germans in Sokołów Małopolski, was forced into a ghetto. In July, German police shot 30 residents of the ghetto, resettled 200 in a labor camp in Głogów, and moved others to the Rzeszów ghetto where they were sent to the Belzec extermination camp in July. Several dozens of Jews who hid from the deportations were murdered later in the year and in the summer of 1943, three Jews and the four Poles hiding them were shot and buried on the grounds of Sokołów Małopolski's elementary school. The number of the few Jewish survivors is unknown.

Sokolow has a 17th-century Jewish cemetery, and a parish church (1908–1916). Today, due to numerous wars and fires, there are only buildings from the 19th and 20th centuries. In 2010, local villagers helped to clean up the Jewish cemetery, though without the cooperation of local officials who reportedly said they didn't want to cooperate with Jews.
