= Gmina Kamień, Podkarpackie Voivodeship =

Gmina Kamień Kamień Commune
- Gmina
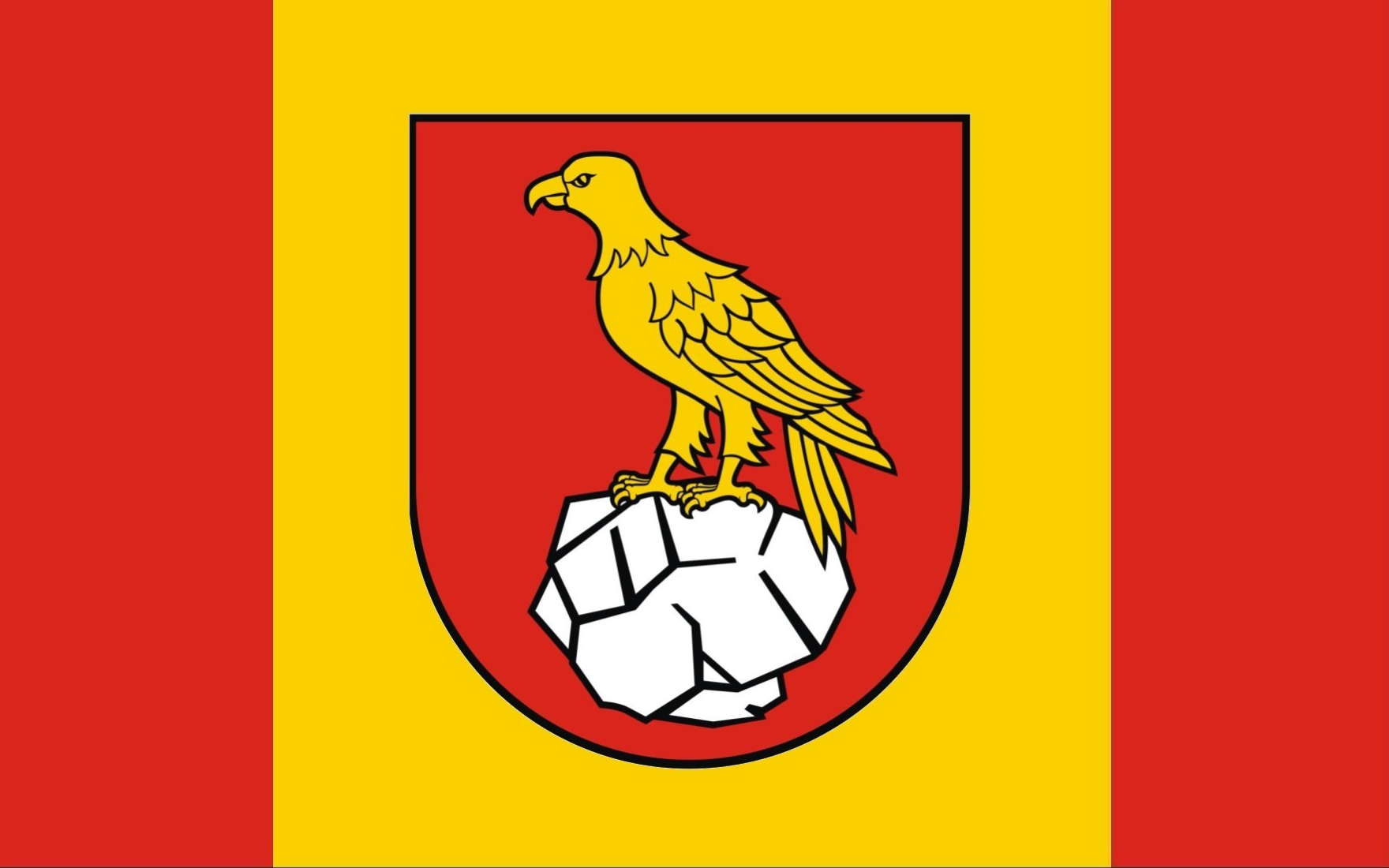
- Flag Coat of arms
- Interactive map of Gmina Kamień
- Coordinates (Kamień): 50°19′25″N 22°8′17″E
- Country: Poland
- Voivodeship: Subcarpathian
- County: Rzeszów County
- Seat: Kamień

Area
  - Total: 73.21 km^{2} (28.27 sq mi)

Population (2006)
  - Total: 6,879
  - Density: 93.96/km^{2} (243.4/sq mi)

Gmina Kamień is a rural gmina (administrative district) in Rzeszów County, Subcarpathian Voivodeship, in south-eastern Poland. Its seat is the village of Kamień, which lies approximately 34 kilometres (21 mi) north of the regional capital Rzeszów.

The gmina covers an area of 73.21 square kilometres (28.3 sq mi), and as of 2006 its total population is 6,879.

== Villages ==
The gmina contains the villages of Kamień (divided into several sołectwos), Krzywa Wieś and Łowisko.

== Neighbouring gminas ==
Gmina Kamień is bordered by the gminas of Jeżowe, Nowa Sarzyna, Raniżów and Sokołów Małopolski.
