= Rzeszów County =

Rzeszów County Powiat rzeszowski
- County
- Flag Coat of arms

- Location within the voivodeship
- Coordinates (Rzeszów): 50°2′1″N 22°0′17″E
- Country: Poland
- Voivodeship: Subcarpathian
- Seat: Rzeszów
- Gminas: Total 14 (incl. 1 urban): Dynów; Gmina Błażowa; Gmina Boguchwała; Gmina Chmielnik; Gmina Dynów; Gmina Głogów Małopolski; Gmina Hyżne; Gmina Kamień; Gmina Krasne; Gmina Lubenia; Gmina Sokołów Małopolski; Gmina Świlcza; Gmina Trzebownisko; Gmina Tyczyn

Area
  - Total: 1,218.8 km^{2} (470.6 sq mi)

Population (2019)
  - Total: 168,614
  - Density: 138.34/km^{2} (358.31/sq mi)
  - Urban: 29,118
  - Rural: 139,496
- Car plates: RZE
- Website: www.powiat.rzeszow.pl

Rzeszów County (Polish: powiat rzeszowski) is a unit of territorial administration and local government (powiat) in Subcarpathian Voivodeship, south-eastern Poland. It came into being on January 1, 1999, as a result of the Polish local government reforms passed in 1998. Its administrative seat is the city of Rzeszów, although the city is not part of the county (it constitutes a separate city county). The county contains six towns: Dynów, 28 km (17 mi) south-east of Rzeszów, Boguchwała, 8 km (5 mi) south-west of Rzeszów, Głogów Małopolski, 16 km (10 mi) north of Rzeszów, Sokołów Małopolski, 24 km (15 mi) north of Rzeszów, Tyczyn, 8 km (5 mi) south of Rzeszów, and Błażowa, 17 km (11 mi) south-east of Rzeszów.

The county covers an area of 1,218.8 square kilometres (470.6 sq mi). As of 2019 its total population is 168,614, out of which the population of Boguchwała is 6,179, that of Głogów Małopolski is 6,654, that of Sokołów Małopolski is 4,193, that of Tyczyn is 3,824, that of Błażowa is 2,139, and the rural population is 139,496.

== Neighbouring counties ==
Apart from the city of Rzeszów, Rzeszów County is also bordered by Nisko County to the north, Leżajsk County to the north-east, Łańcut County, Przeworsk County and Przemyśl County to the east, Brzozów County to the south, Strzyżów County to the south-west, Ropczyce-Sędziszów County to the west, and Kolbuszowa County to the north-west.

== Administrative divisions ==
The county is subdivided into 14 gminas (one urban, five urban-rural and eight rural). These are listed in the following table, in descending order of population.

Gmina	Type	Area (km^{2})	Population (2019)	Seat
Gmina Trzebownisko	rural	90.5	22,077	Trzebownisko
Gmina Boguchwała	urban-rural	88.9	20,674	Boguchwała
Gmina Głogów Małopolski	urban-rural	142.3	19,558	Głogów Małopolski
Gmina Sokołów Małopolski	urban-rural	134.0	17,278	Sokołów Małopolski
Gmina Świlcza	rural	106.6	16,120	Świlcza
Gmina Krasne	rural	39.1	11,393	Krasne
Gmina Błażowa	urban-rural	112.7	10,804	Błażowa
Gmina Tyczyn	urban-rural	53.7	10,414	Tyczyn
Gmina Hyżne	rural	50.9	7,063	Hyżne
Gmina Dynów	rural	119.0	6,913	Dynów *
Gmina Chmielnik	rural	52.9	6,899	Chmielnik
Gmina Kamień	rural	73.2	6,855	Kamień
Gmina Lubenia	rural	54.9	6,437	Lubenia
Dynów	urban	24.4	6,129	
* seat not part of the gmina
