= List of people from Belarus =

This is a list of people connected to the Republic of Belarus. It is not limited to persons of Belarusian ethnicity; Russians, Jews, Poles, Vikings, etc., may be found in this list. Over time the Belarusian land has had many rulers, and often its culture was suppressed. Therefore, many Belarusian nationals are known to the world as Poles or Russians.

== Culture ==
- Solomon Mikhoels
- Hanna Rovina (1893–1980), Israeli actress
- J. Michael Straczynski

=== Artists ===
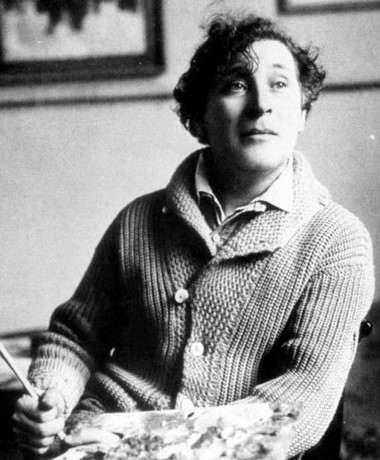
Marc Chagall

- Marc Chagall
- Kirk Douglas
- Naum Gabo, sculptor
- Michel Kikoine
- Dmitry Koldun
- Pinchus Kremegne
- Yehudi Menuhin
- Mikhail Savitsky
- Chaïm Soutine
- Sergey Voychenko
- Ossip Zadkine

=== Composers ===
- Irving Berlin
- Vladimir Dukelsky
- Napoleon Orda

=== Film ===
- Evgeny Ruman

=== Singers ===
- Bianka
- Rita Dakota
- Valeria Gribusova
- Alyona Lanskaya
- Alexander Rybak
- Teo

=== Writers ===
- Ales Adamovich
- Svetlana Alexievich
- Guillaume Apollinaire, Belarusian mother
- Maksim Bahdanovich
- Francishak Bahushevich
- Janka Bryl
- Vasil Bykau
- Vintsent Dunin-Martsinkyevich
- Avraham Even-Shoshan (1906–1984), Israeli linguist and lexicographer
- Nil Hilevich
- Nicolai Hussoviani
- Uladzimir Karatkevich
- Hienadz Kliauko
- Yakub Kolas
- Janka Kupala
- John Lettou
- Oleg Manaev
- Vera Maslovskaya, poet
- Janka Maur
- Ivan Melezh
- Alexander S. Potupa
- Ryhor Reles
- Mendele Mocher Sforim, founder of modern Yiddish and modern Hebrew literature
- Ivan Shamiakin
- Maksim Tank

== Business ==
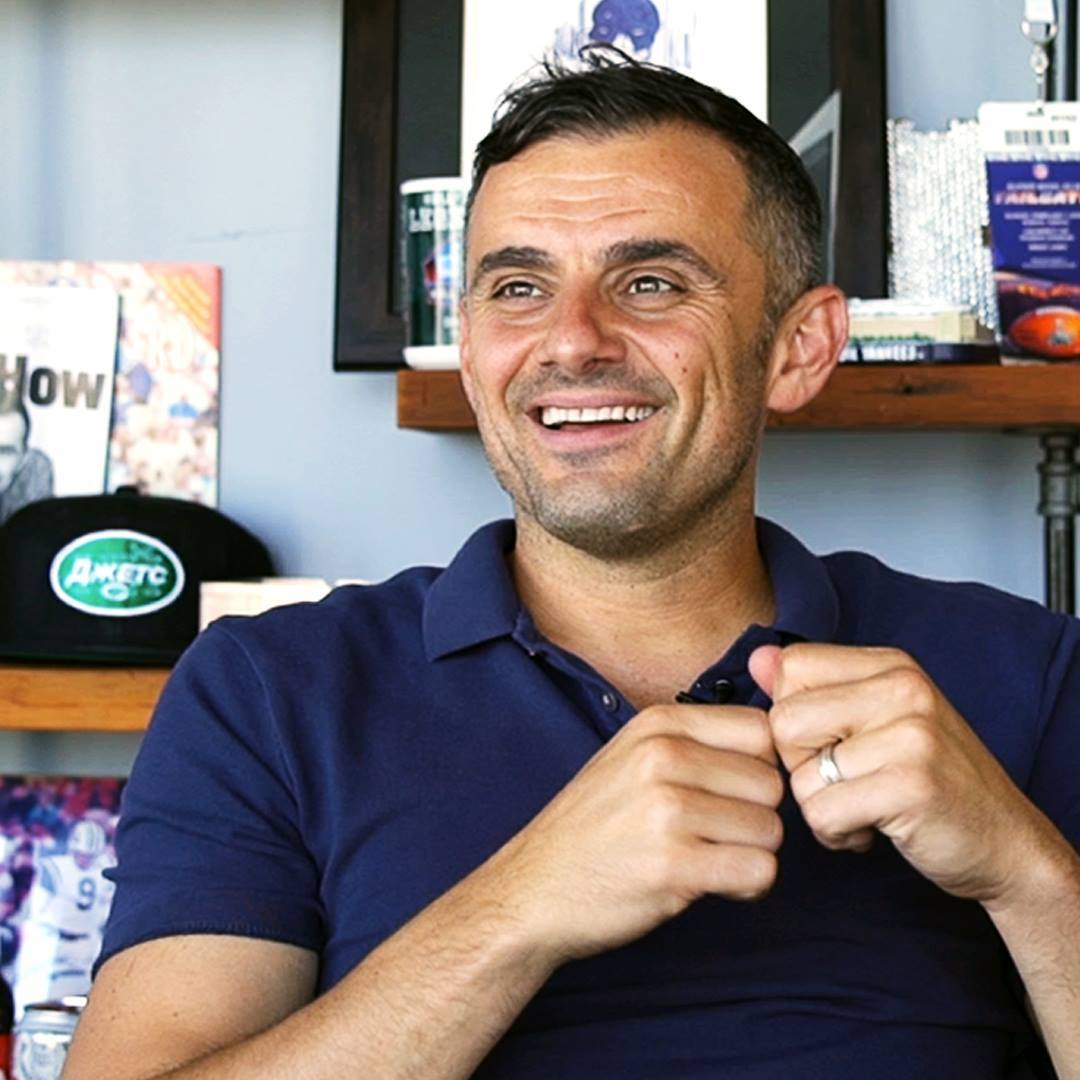
Gary Vaynerchuk

- Leonard and Phil Chess
- Michael Marks
- Alexander S. Potupa
- David Sarnoff
- Gary Vaynerchuk
- Ruslan Kogan

== State, revolution, military, politics ==
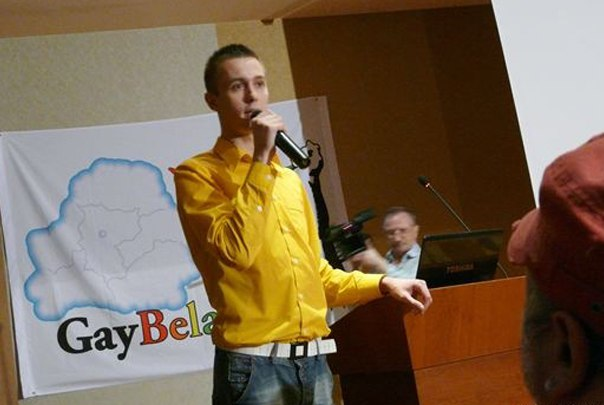
Sergey Androsenko

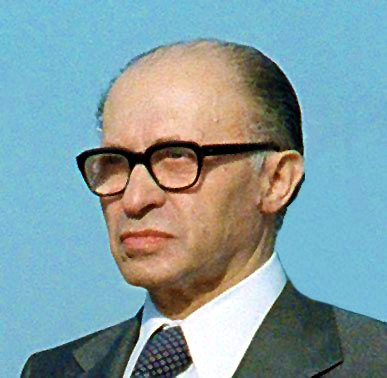
Menachem Begin

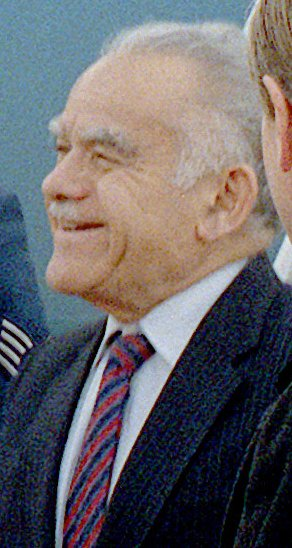
Yitzhak Shamir

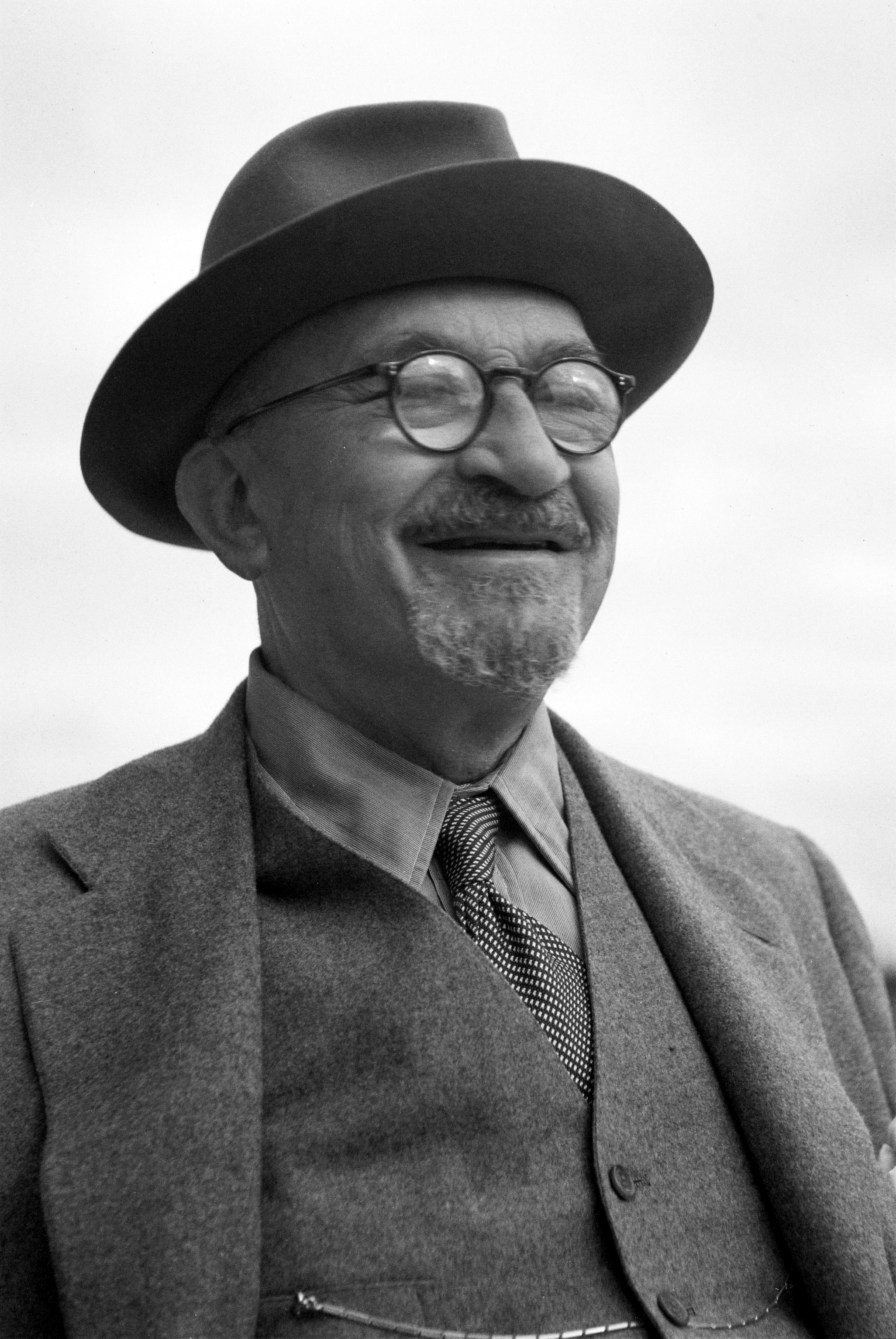
Chaim Weizmann

- Nadezhda Abramova
- Olga Abramova
- Sergey Androsenko
- Menachem Begin, Prime Minister of Israel
- Eliezer Ben-Yehuda
- Catherine Breshkovsky
- Stanislau Bulak-Balachovitch
- Faddei Bulgarin
- Chiang Fang-liang
- Anatoly Chubais
- David Dubinsky
- Andrei Gromyko
- Isser Harel, head of the Israeli Mossad
- Vyacheslav Kebich
- Alexander Lukashenko
- Alaksandar Milinkievič
- Valeria Novodvorskaya
- Nasta Palazhanka, activist
- Alexander Parvus
- Dmitri Pavlichenko
- Zyanon Paznyak
- Shimon Peres, Prime Minister and President of Israel
- Alexander S. Potupa
- Rogneda of Polotsk
- Lev Sapieha
- Yitzhak Shamir
- Zalman Shazar, President of Israel
- Stanislav Shushkevich
- Dzianis Sidarenka, diplomat
- Sergey Sidorsky
- Siarhei Skrabets
- Chaim Weizmann, President of Israel

== Scholars ==
- Yefim Karsky
- Uladzimir Konan
- Raphael Lemkin
- Moisey Ostrogorsky
- Leon Petrażycki
- Stefania Ulanowska
- Lev Vygotsky

== Religion ==
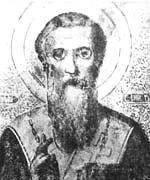
Cyril of Turaŭ

- Cyril of Turaŭ
- Euphrosyne of Polatsk
- Jazafat Kuncevič
- Shneur Zalman of Liadi, Rabbi and Founder of Chabad-Lubavitch Hasidic movement
- Menachem Mendel Schneersohn, the Tzemach Tzedek, 3rd Lubavitcher Rebbe
- Yisrael Meir Kagan, famous 19th century Rabbi (Chofetz Chaim)
- Joseph Lookstein, Rabbi and President of Bar-Ilan University

== Science ==
- Zhores Ivanovich Alferov, Nobel Prize laureate
- Yury Bandazhevsky
- Alexander Bogdanov
- Symon Budny
- Morris Raphael Cohen, Jewish philosopher
- Valery Fabrikant, mechanical engineer, mass murderer
- Konstanty Jelski, ornithologist and zoologist
- Berl Katznelson
- Pyotr Klimuk, cosmonaut
- Elena Korosteleva, political scientist
- Semyon Ariyevich Kosberg
- Vladimir Kovalyonok, cosmonaut
- Simon Kuznets
- Seymour Lubetzky
- Salomon Maimon, Jewish philosopher
- Leonid Mandelstam, Jewish physicist
- Mark Nemenman, Jewish computer scientist
- Alexandre Okinczyc, doctor
- Alexander S. Potupa
- Francysk Skaryna
- Spiridon Sobol, printer, educator and writer
- Pavel Sukhoi
- Branislau Tarashkevich
- Immanuel Velikovsky
- Lev Vygotsky
- Oscar Zariski

== Journalism ==
- Veronika Cherkasova
- Ihar Hermianchuk
- Pavel Sheremet

== Sports ==
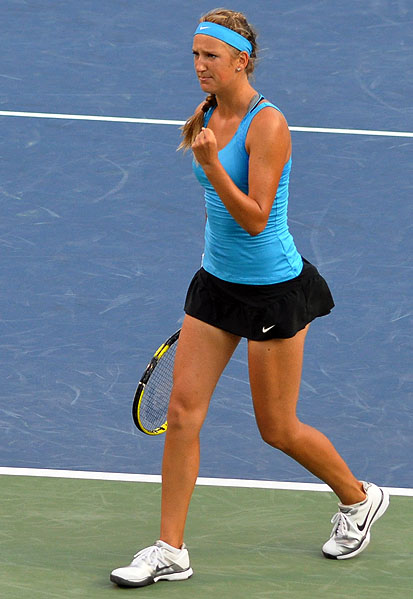
Victoria Azarenka

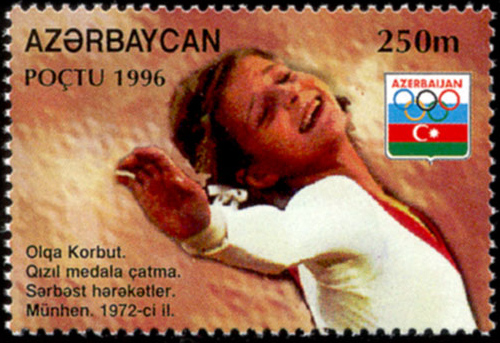
Olga Korbut

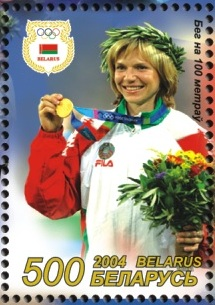
Yulia Nestsiarenka

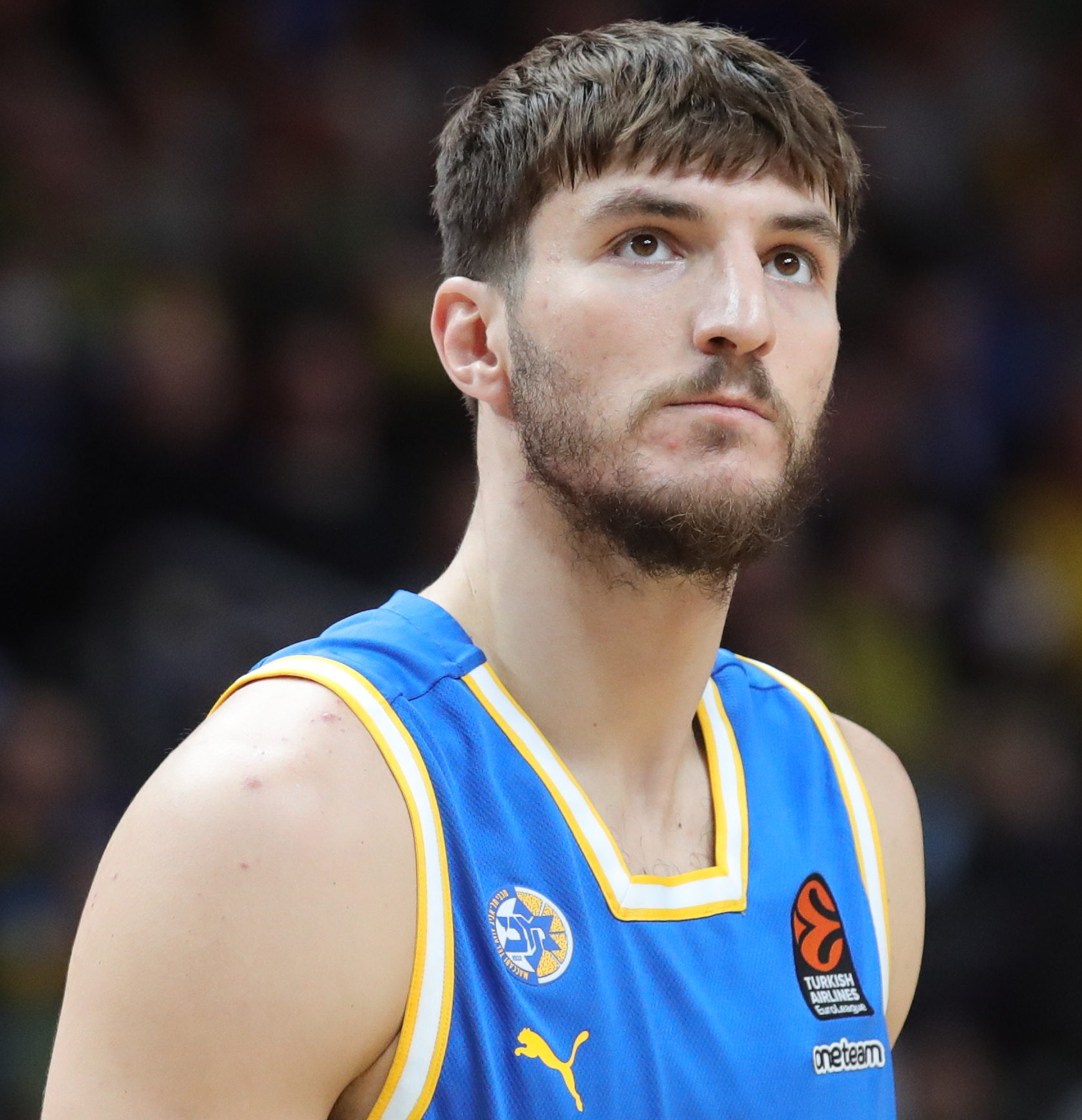
Roman Sorkin

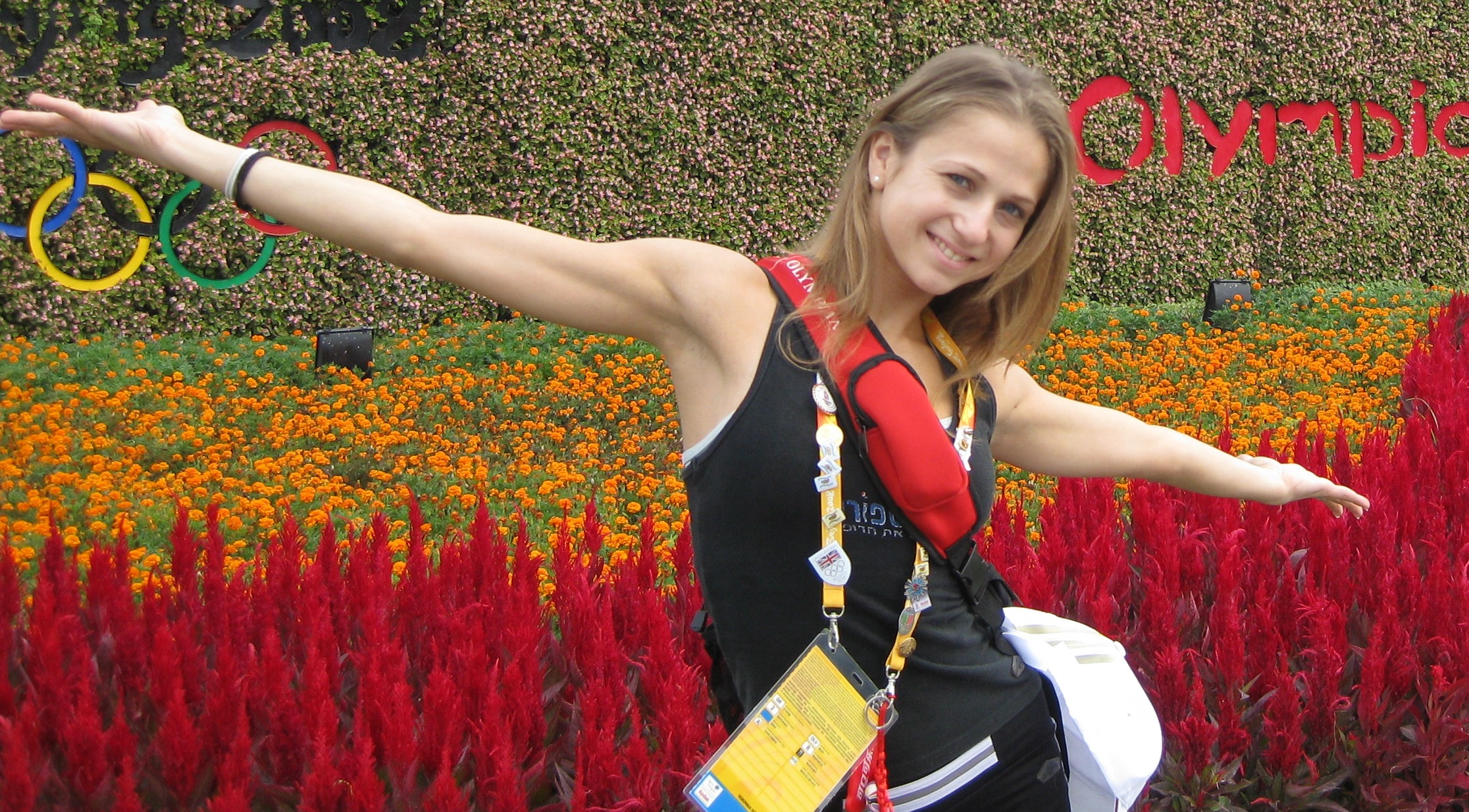
Veronika Vitenberg

- Andrei Aramnau
- Andrei Arlovski, former UFC Heavyweight Champion and MMA fighter
- Vladimir and Alexander Artemev, father and son gymnasts
- Anzhela Atroshchenko
- Victoria Azarenka, tennis player
- Benjamin Blumenfeld, chess player
- Svetlana Boguinskaya
- Pavel Bure, ice hockey player
- Cypher, real name Alexey Yanushevsky, professional gamer
- Darya Domracheva, biathlete, four-time Olympic champion
- Yuri Foreman, middleweight and World Boxing Association super welterweight boxing champion
- Leonid Geishtor, sprint canoer, Olympic champion Canadian pairs 1,000-meter
- Boris Gelfand, chess player
- Mikhail Grabovski, ice hockey player
- Sergei Gurenko
- Alexander Hleb, footballer
- Alexey Ignashov, K1 Superstar
- Maria Leontyavna Itkina, runner
- Ekaterina Karsten
- Olga Korbut
- Andrei Kostitsyn, ice hockey player
- Sergei Kostitsyn, ice hockey player
- Abraham Kupchik, chess player
- Vitali Kutuzov
- Dmitri Markov
- Vladimir Matyushenko, MMA fighter
- Vladimir Samsonov, table tennis player
- Alexander Medved, weightlifter
- Artem Milevskyi
- Max Mirnyi, tennis player
- Georgiy Monastyrskiy, footballer
- Georgi Mondzolevski, Olympic and world champion volleyball player
- Yulia Nesterenko, sprinter
- Uladzimir Parfianovich
- Evgenia Pavlina, rhythmic gymnast
- Lev Polugaevsky, chess player
- Yulia Raskina, Olympic silver medalist in rhythmic gymnastics
- Roman Rubinshteyn (born 1996), Belarusian-Israeli basketball player in the Israeli Basketball Premier League
- Andrei Rybakou
- Ruslan Salei, ice hockey player
- Vitaly Scherbo, artistic gymnast
- Gennady Korotkevich, competitive programmer
- Aryna Sabalenka, tennis player
- Maria Sharapova, tennis player
- Valery Shary, Olympic champion weightlifter (light-heavyweight)
- Nadezhda Skardino, Olympic champion biathlete
- Anna Smashnova (born 1976), Belarusian-born Israeli tennis player
- Ilya Smirin, chess player
- Roman Sorkin (born 1996), Israeli basketball player in the Israeli Basketball Premier League
- Ivan Tikhon
- Veronika Vitenberg, Israeli Olympic rhythmic gymnast
- Diana Vaisman, Belarusian-born Israeli sprinter
- Alexandra Zaretski, ice dancer, Olympian
- Roman Zaretski, ice dancer, Olympian
- Ina Žukava, rhythmic gymnast
- Svetlana Zilberman, badminton player
- Natasha Zvereva, tennis player

== Models ==
- Janice Dickinson, American supermodel of Belarusian and Polish descent
- Tanya Dziahileva, Belarusian model of Polish, Belarusian, and Ukrainian descent
- Maryna Linchuk, Belarusian model of Russian descent, born in Minsk, Belarus
