= Sawa (river) =

Small river in Poland

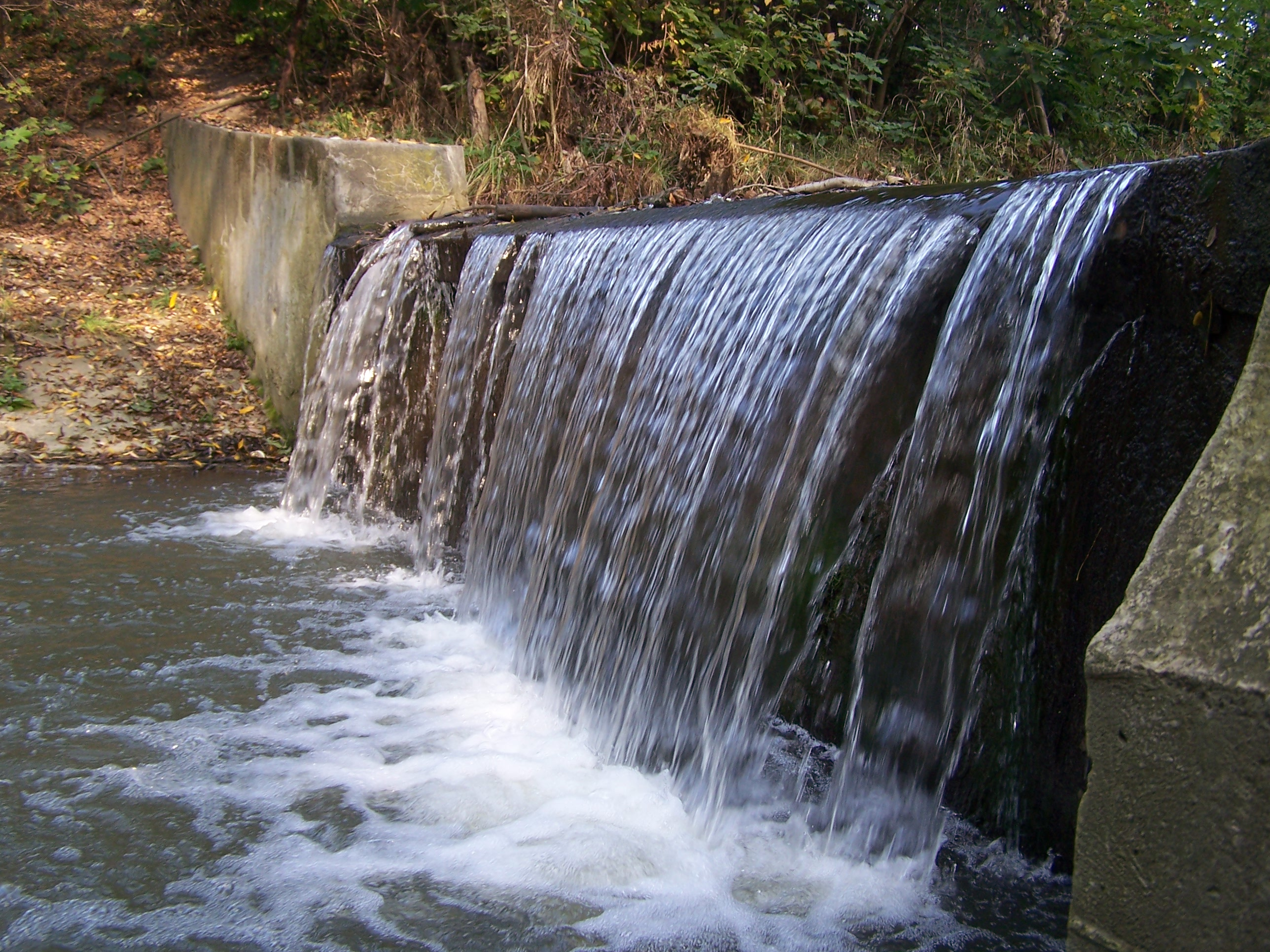

Location
- Country: Poland
- Voivodeships: Subcarpathian
- Settlements: Handzlówka, Albigowa, Wysoka, Sonina, Głuchów, Łańcut

Physical characteristics
- Source
  - location: Dynów Foothills near Husów, Handzlówka, and Błędowa Tyczyńska
- Mouth: Wisłok
  - location: Near Łańcut
  - coordinates: 50°06′45″N 22°17′56″E
  - elevation: 179,3 m
- Length: 22.95 km (14.26 mi)

Sawa (Polish: [ˈsa.va]), also known as Głuchówka (Polish: [ɡwuˈxuf.ka]), is a small river in Subcarpathian Voivodeship, Poland.

== Description ==
Its spring is located in Dynów Foothills near the villages of Husów, Handzlówka, and Błędowa Tyczyńska, and it tributes into the Wisłok river, near Łańcut. Its length is 22.95 km. The settlements located at the river are: Handzlówka, Albigowa, Wysoka, Sonina, Głuchów, and Łańcut.
