= Kraczkowa =

- Village
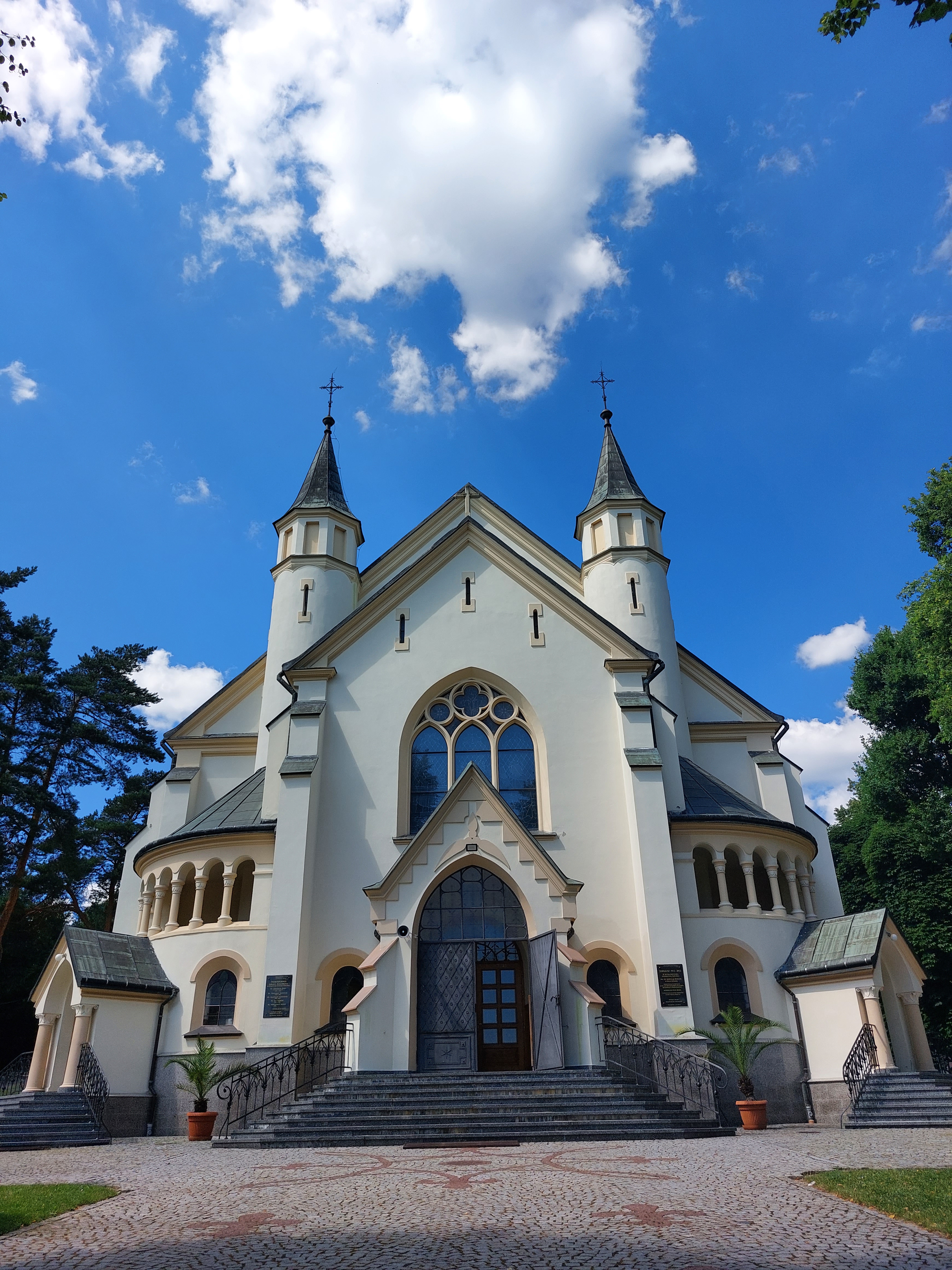
- Saint Nicholas church in Kraczkowa

- Location within Poland
- Coordinates: 50°2′17″N 22°10′9″E
- Country: Poland
- Voivodeship: Subcarpathian
- County: Łańcut
- Gmina: Łańcut
- Time zone: UTC+1 (CET)
  - Summer (DST): UTC+2 (CEST)
- Vehicle registration: RLA

Kraczkowa [krat͡ʂˈkɔva] is a village in the administrative district of Gmina Łańcut, within Łańcut County, Subcarpathian Voivodeship, in south-eastern Poland.

== Geography ==
Kraczkowa is situated between Rzeszów - the capital of Subcarpathia province, and Łańcut on European route E40. Kraczkowa includes hamlets such as: Tłoki, Budy Kraczkowskie, Działy Wschodnie, Działy Zachodnie. Cierpisz, once belonged to Kraczkowa.

== History ==
Kraczkowa was established under German law and founded by Otto of Pilica in 1369. Kraczkowa belonged to families such as Pilecki, Korniakt and Potocki. A member of Viennese Parliament, Tomasz Szajer was born.
The "Declaration of Rights of Young Generation" was signed there in 1936. Kraczkowa was a thriving center, of the peasant movement (ruch ludowy) that emerged in Galicia at the time.

Five Polish citizens were murdered by Nazi Germany in the village during World War II.

== Notable places ==
Cross on the Kraczkowskie Błonia–The first wooden cross was built in 1901 and was consecrated by Father Stojałowski. The cross mediated between God and the flock. It protected crops and farms from disaster. It was destroyed during World War II. A new cross was constructed by "Solidarność" on the anniversary of "sierpień 1980" in 1981.

Stations of the Cross on Zimna Góra–Zimna Góra is a 238 m hill situated on Kraczkowa and Cierpisz border. Zimna Góra is a road used to travel from Cierpisz to Kraczkowa. In 1988 the Stations of the Cross were built along the road. At the top of the hill stands a shrine.

Church in Kraczkowa–Church of St. Nicholas in Kraczkowa was built in 1911-1913 as a Neo-Gothic temple with Neo-Romanesque elements. It has wooden equipment and murals. The church hosts memorabilia associated with John Paul II. The most notable memorial is the cross that John Paul II held during the Good Friday service in 2005. These relics have led to many miracles. Other papal items are in the School of Kraczkowa which was named in honor of John Paul II.

Valley of Divine Mercy in Kraczkowa–The valley was designed to thank God for his grace and the triumphs of the Divine Mercy in Kraczkowa Parish. The valley displays figures of saints, the chapel and the Stations of the Cross.

The Shrines and Crosses trail connects Grunwald - Hill Magdalenka - Cierpisz and Grunwald, covering 15.5 kilometers. It starts and ends next to the monument of Grunwald Glory in Kraczkowa. The route is divided into four sections of varying difficulty. It passes 20 historic shrines, four crosses, 300-year-old oaks, a church dedicated to Mary Magdalene, agritourism farms, cultural centers and viewpoints.

== Cultural organizations ==
Kraczkowa hosts the Dance group "Patria", a brass band, a mixed choir and a chamber orchestra "Nicolaus".
