= Union of Belarusian Youth =

- Саюз беларускай моладзі
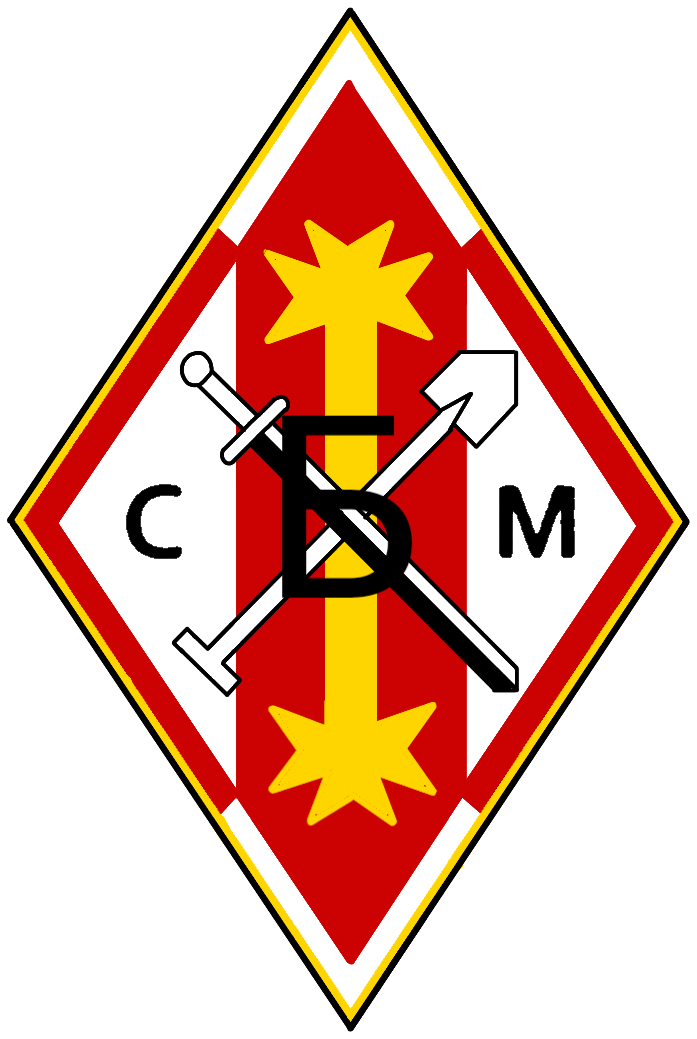

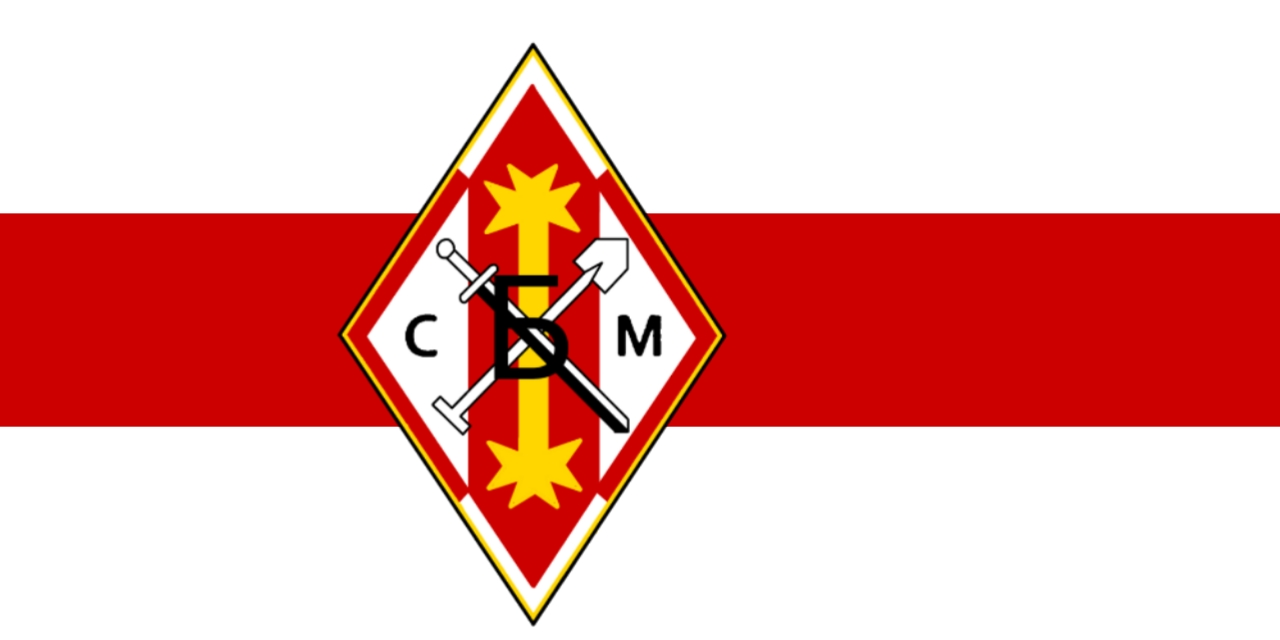
- Formation: June 22, 1943
- Founder: Wilhelm Kube
- Founded at: Belarus
- Dissolved: 1945
- Type: Youth organization
- Headquarters: Minsk (June 1943 - July 1944); Berlin (July 1944 - April 1945)
- Members: circa 10,000 (1943); 12,600 (July 1944)
- Secretary General: Mikhas Hanko (males); Nadzieja Abramava (females)
- Parent organization: Hitler Youth

The Union of Belarusian Youth (Belarusian: Саюз беларускай моладзі) was a youth organization in the territory of German-occupied Belarus during World War II.

== History ==
The Union of Belarusian Youth (UBY) was created on June 22, 1943, on the model of the Hitler Youth by order of the Commissioner General of Belarus Wilhelm Kube. From its beginning, the UBY was planned as a Belarusian youth independent organization subordinate to the German occupation authorities. Therefore, its main goal was to prepare a new generation of Belarusians in the spirit of German National Socialism. By creating the UBY, the German occupation authorities deliberately considered it as one of the sources of recruitment of labor for the Third Reich. The creation of the UBY was accompanied by a broad pro-propaganda campaign aimed at showing the change in Germany's relations with Belarus and sought to win young people to their side to replenish the workforce, military auxiliary and police formations. The organization was financed by contributions from its members, income from cultural events, donations from citizens and organizations, budget funds of the German occupation authorities and deductions from German entrepreneurs who used the labor force of its members.

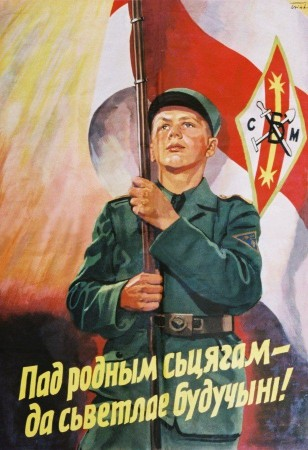
Propaganda poster of the Union of Belarusian Youth

The primary link was a squad, which included 15-20 members of the same age and gender; 3-5 squads were a community (for boys) and a circle (for girls). At the head of the squad was a druzhinovy (male) or druzhinovaya (female), which were appointed by the district head. In each county, "unions" (for boys) and "circles" (for girls) were formed, they were headed by an Ally and a counselor, who were intended by the leadership staff of the UBY. Schools were opened in Albertina (Slonim District), Drazdy (near Minsk), Florianovo (Lyakhavichy District) and Minsk (under the leadership headquarters) to train the Union's leadership personnel. In June 1943-July 1944, about 1,500 junior, middle and senior UBY functionaries were trained in the occupied territory of Belarus. On July 1, 1944, UBY units were created in 16 districts and more than 60 counties, there were more than 12.6 thousand people in them, of which 3.5 thousand were united in the UBY working group "Germany" and worked at German military enterprises. Members of the Union were involved in military construction and economic work in the occupied territory of Belarus. 3 spring 1944 recruitment to the military auxiliary formations of the Wehrmacht and the Luftwaffe, the Byelorussian Home Defence, and the Belarusian police battalions began.

Under the influence of the victories of the Red Army, propaganda and organizational activities of the Soviet partisans, many ordinary members and some leaders of the UBY went over to the side of the Soviet partisans. Some of the active members (about three thousand people) left Belarus together with the retreating units of the German army. The activities of the UBY continued in Germany until the spring of 1945. Some of the organization's members, after the defeat of German troops during the offensive of the Red Army, went into the anti-Soviet resistance.

The main printing body of the organization was the magazine "Long Live Belarus!" and the newspaper "Youth Call". UBY published educational and methodical publications: "Diary of Orders", "Training Leaflet", "Service of Young Men". The highest body of the SBM was the management staff headed by the chief conductor Mikhas Hanko (men) and Nadzieja Abramava (women). The headquarters was located in Minsk, from July 1944 in Berlin.
