= Markowa =

- Village
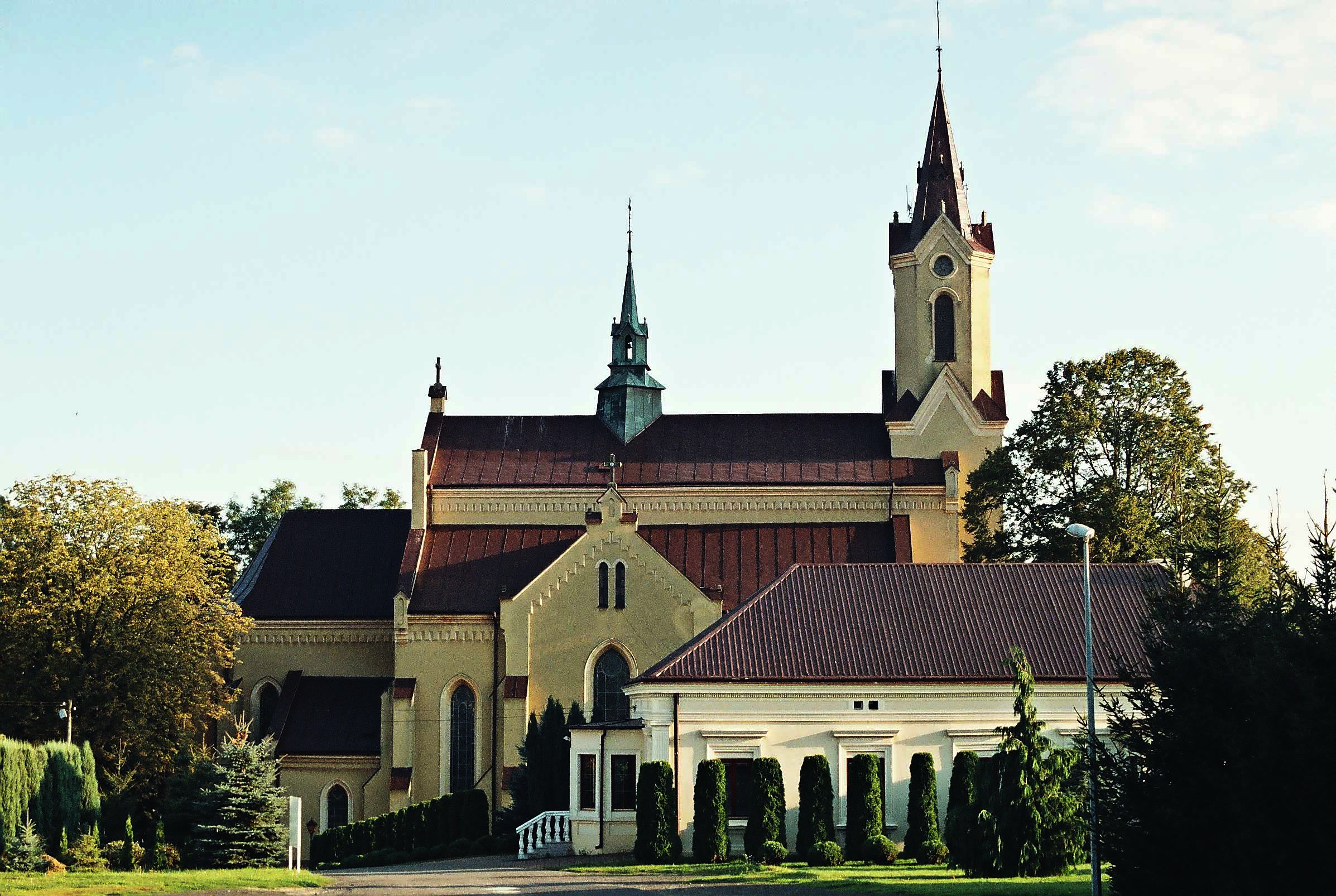
- Church of Saint Dorothy in Markowa

- Location within Poland
- Coordinates: 50°1′13″N 22°18′1″E
- Country: Poland
- Voivodeship: Subcarpathian
- County: Łańcut
- Gmina: Markowa
- Population: 4,100
- Time zone: UTC+1 (CET)
  - Summer (DST): UTC+2 (CEST)
- Vehicle registration: RLA
- Catholic diocese: Archdiocese of Przemyśl
- Feast day: 6 February (Feast of Saint Dorothy); 7 July (Feast of Blesseds Ulma Family)
- Patron saints: Saint Dorothy; Blesseds Józef and Wiktoria Ulma with Seven Children

Markowa [marˈkɔva] is a village in Łańcut County, Subcarpathian Voivodeship, in south-eastern Poland. It is the seat of the gmina (administrative district) called Gmina Markowa.

== History ==
The village was founded in the 14th century by the Polish noble family of Pilecki, and was settled by the descendants of German colonists, who called it Markhof. The Pileckis also founded a Catholic parish in the village.

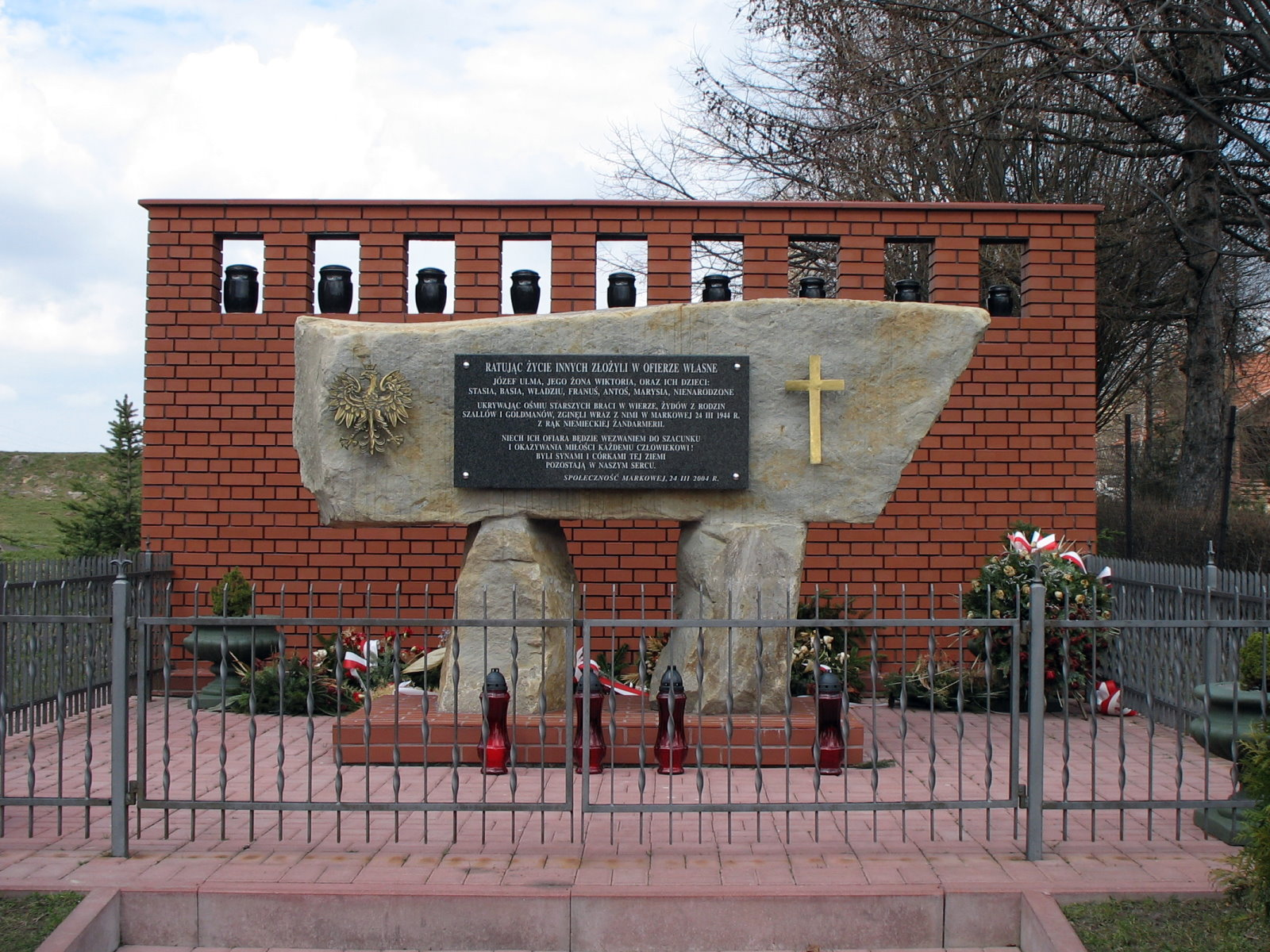
Grave monument of Ulma family executed in 1944

During World War II it was under German occupation.

On 24 March 1944 a patrol of German police came to the house of Józef and Wiktoria Ulma, where they found eight Jewish members of the Szall and Goldman families. At first the Germans executed all the Jews. Then they shot the pregnant Wiktoria and her husband. When the six children began to scream at the sight of their parents' bodies, Joseph Kokott, a German police officer (Volksdeutsche from Koblov in Hlučín Region), shot them after consulting with his superior. The other killers were Eilert Dieken, Michael Dziewulski and Erich Wilde. Afterwards the Germans robbed the house and workshop of the Ulma family and organized an alcoholic libation. On the 60th anniversary of this tragedy, a memorial was erected in memory of the family. The family was beatified by the Catholic Church, with the ceremony taking place in Markowa on 10 September 2023 by papal delegate Cardinal Marcello Semeraro. Other Polish families also hid Jews in Markowa, and at least 17 Jews survived the German occupation and the Holocaust in five Polish homes.

The Markowa Ulma-Family Museum of Poles Who Saved Jews in World War II is located in the village.

== See also ==
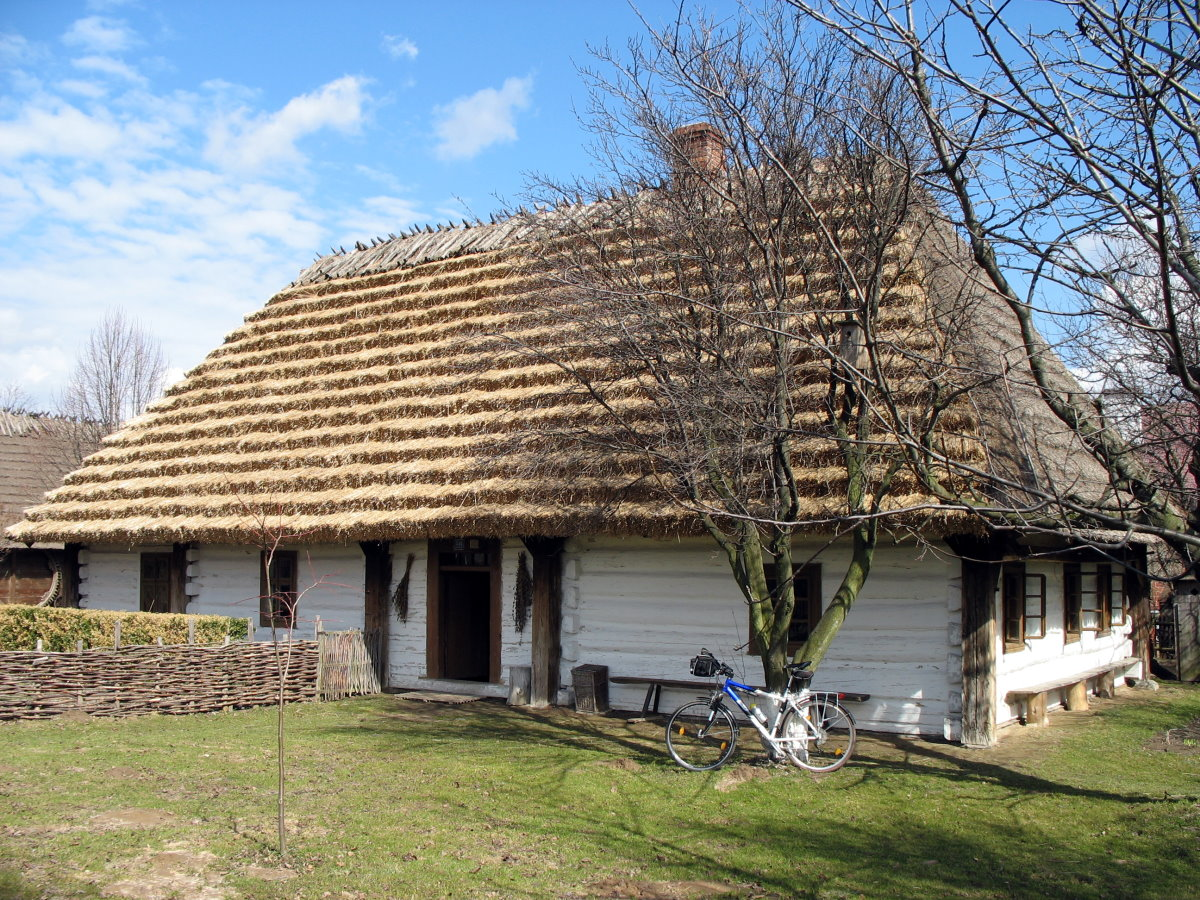
The Skansen of Markowa. The typical Umgebindehaus - houses, about 150–200 km (93–124 mi) southeast of Kraków, around 18/19th century, built in the style of ancient mountain Walddeutsche atmosphere.

- Walddeutsche
- Rescue of Jews by Poles during the Holocaust
