= Gmina Markowa =

Gmina Markowa Markowa Commune
- Gmina
- Flag Coat of arms
- Interactive map of Gmina Markowa
- Coordinates (Markowa): 50°1′13″N 22°18′1″E
- Country: Poland
- Voivodeship: Subcarpathian
- County: Łańcut
- Seat: Markowa

Area
  - Total: 68.46 km^{2} (26.43 sq mi)

Population (2011)
  - Total: 6,617
  - Density: 96.65/km^{2} (250.3/sq mi)
- Website: http://www.markowa.pl

Gmina Markowa is a rural gmina (administrative district) in Łańcut County, Subcarpathian Voivodeship, in south-eastern Poland. Its seat is the village of Markowa, which lies approximately 8 kilometres (5 mi) south-east of Łańcut and 22 km (14 mi) east of the regional capital Rzeszów.

The gmina covers an area of 68.46 square kilometres (26.4 sq mi), and as of 2006 its total population is 6,639 (6,617 in 2011).

== Neighbouring gminas ==
Gmina Markowa is bordered by the gminas of Chmielnik, Gać, Hyżne, Jawornik Polski, Kańczuga and Łańcut.

== Villages ==
Gmina Markowa contains the villages (sołectwos) of Husów, Markowa and Tarnawka.
