= Gmina Łańcut =

Gmina Łańcut Łańcut Commune
- Gmina
- Coat of arms
- Interactive map of Gmina Łańcut
- Coordinates (Łańcut): 50°4′N 22°14′E
- Country: Poland
- Voivodeship: Subcarpathian
- County: Łańcut
- Seat: Łańcut

Area
  - Total: 106.65 km^{2} (41.18 sq mi)

Population (2011)
  - Total: 21,108
  - Density: 197.92/km^{2} (512.61/sq mi)
- Website: http://www.gminalancut.pl/

Gmina Łańcut (Łańcut Commune) is a rural gmina (administrative district) in Łańcut County, Subcarpathian Voivodeship, in southeastern Poland. Its seat is the town of Łańcut (site of the famous Łańcut Castle), although the town is not part of the territory of the gmina.

The gmina covers an area of 106.65 square kilometres (41.2 sq mi), and as of 2006 its total population is 20,313 (21,108 in 2011).

== Neighbouring gminas ==
Gmina Łańcut is bordered by the town of Łańcut and by the gminas of Białobrzegi, Chmielnik, Czarna, Gać, Krasne, Markowa and Przeworsk.

== Villages ==
The gmina contains the following villages: Albigowa, Cierpisz, Głuchów, Handzlówka, Kosina, Kraczkowa, Rogóżno, Sonina and Wysoka.
