= Tarnawka, Łańcut County =

Tarnawka
- Village
- Location within Poland
- Coordinates: 49°56′59″N 22°16′48″E
- Country: Poland
- Voivodeship: Subcarpathian
- County: Łańcut
- Gmina: Markowa
- Population: 475

Tarnawka [tarˈnafka] is a village in the administrative district of Gmina Markowa, within Łańcut County, Subcarpathian Voivodeship, in south-eastern Poland.
