= Ulma Family museum in Markowa =

Museum in Markowa, Poland

Markowa Ulma Family Museum of Poles saving Jews in World War II
- Muzeum Polaków Ratujących Żydów podczas II wojny światowej im. Rodziny Ulmów w Markowej
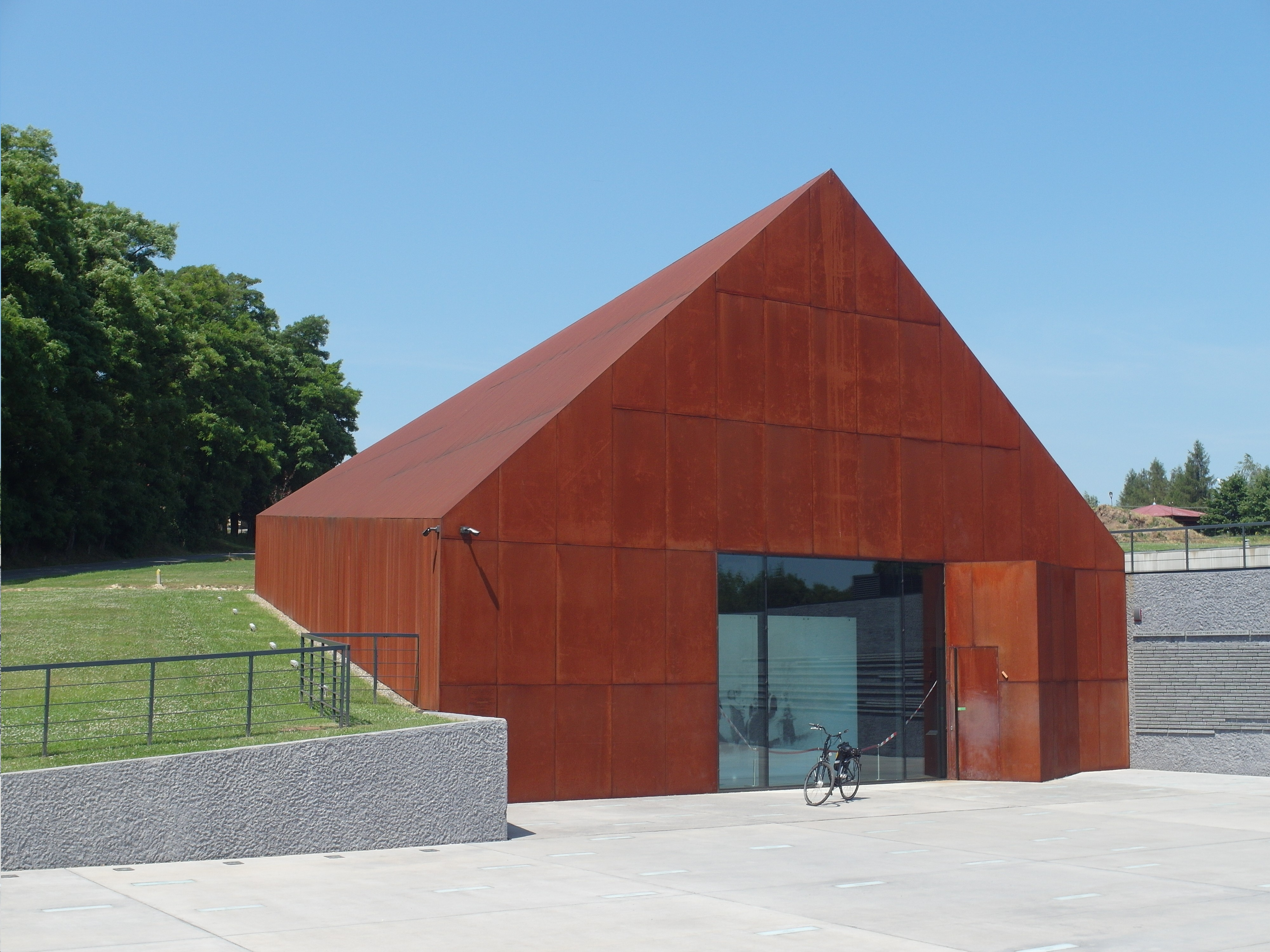
- Established: 17 March 2016
- Location: Markowa, Poland
- Visitors: 50,000
- Director: Anna Stróż
- Website: Official website

The Ulma Family musem in Markowa, in full Markowa Ulma Family Museum of Poles saving Jews in World War II is a museum located in Markowa, Poland. The Łańcut Castle Museum began the Ulma-Family Museum's construction in 2013, and the new Museum opened on 17 March 2016.

On 30 June 2017, pursuant to an agreement of 23 June 2017 entered into by Subcarpathian Province and Poland's Ministry of Culture and National Heritage, the Museum was incorporated as an independent legal entity, to be operated jointly by the two parties. The Ulma-Family Museum is entered in Poland's Register of Cultural Organizations as No. RIK 103/2017.

== History ==
The decision to build the museum was taken by the Subcarpathian Regional Assembly in June 2008. A space of 500 square meters was allocated for a restoration of the Ulma family home and for an exhibition hall, lecture hall, and research facility. Construction cost 6.5 million złotych.

In its first year of operation, the Ulma-Family Museum hosted 50,000 visitors.

== The structure and its surroundings ==
The designers created a semi-glazed facade that conceals a mystery that visitors will discover. The building juts into the square. The front of the museum is a universal symbolic representation of a house, reminiscent of the history of pre-war Markowa. It suggests both the times of the Shoah, and unchanging form and persistence in the face of historical adversities. The exhibition covers some 120 square meters.^{2}.

The wall in front of the museum displays plaques with names of Poles who saved Jews. In the square before the museum are illuminated tablets with the names of those who died saving Jews. Due to limited space, the names of only those who were active in present-day Subcarpathian Province are given.

Next to the museum itself, a garden is being created that will commemorate with illuminated plaques the Polish cities and towns where Jewish residents were rescued by the 6,700 persons recognized as the Polish Righteous among the Nations. Some 1,500 such places have been identified. The memorial garden will incorporate the monument to the Ulma family, erected in 2004, that stands in the Markowa open-air museum.

== Exhibit ==
The museum commemorates all the Poles who, at the risk of their own lives, saved Jews condemned by the Germans to extermination. It was named after Markowa's Ulma family (Józef Ulma, his wife Wiktoria, and their seven children), who were murdered by German gendarmes on 24 March 1944, along with the eight Jews whom they had been sheltering. Other Polish Markowa residents succeeded in saving 21 Jews.

The former Israeli ambassador to Poland Shevah Weiss has described the museum as a "Temple of Memory".
