= Mikołaj Hussowczyk =

Polish-Lithuanian poet and activist

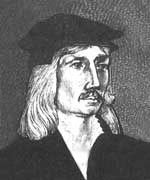
Nicolaus Hussovianus

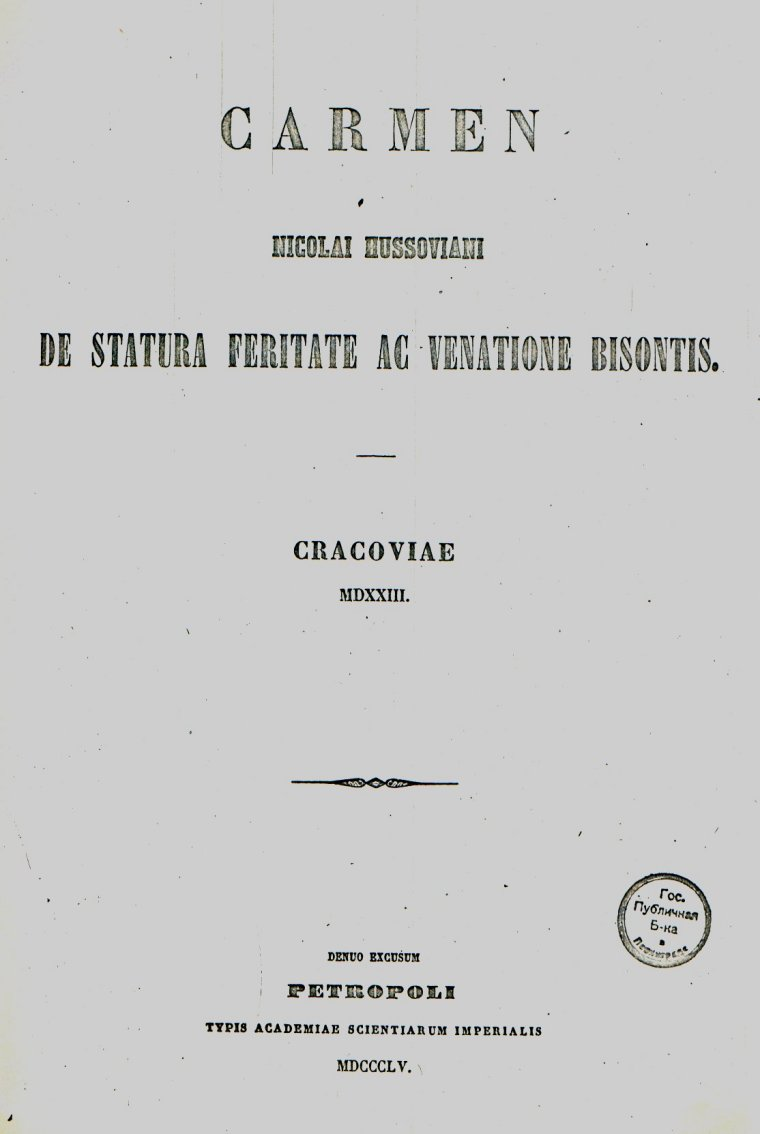
Hussovianus' book The Song about Bison, Its Stature, Ferocity and Hunt is the first large fiction work about Lithuania

Mikołaj Hussowczyk (Belarusian: Мікола Гусоўскі, romanized: Mikola Husoŭski, Lithuanian: Mikalojus Husovianas, Latin: Nicolaus Hussovianus). Other name spelling variants include Hussoviensis, Hussovianus, Ussovius, Hussowski, Gusowski); (c. 1480 (Note: Date of Hussowczyk's birth is not certain, established as between 1475 and 1485 (Kotarski).) – c. 1533 (Note: It is also not known when he died; he was definitely still alive in 1533 (Kotarski).)) was an early Renaissance poet and humanist of Poland and the Grand Duchy of Lithuania, and a cultural and social activist. His most notable work is the poem Carmen de statura...bisontis (Song about...the bison).

== Biography ==
Little is known of his life, except during the 1520s. His place of birth is alternatively stated as Husów/Hussowo near Łańcut or in an unspecified Belarusian village with similar-sounding name. Some folkloristic features in the works of Husowski may point to regions in the vicinity of Hrodna.

He was probably a student of Kraków Academy since 1504. Before 1515 he became cleric of Diocese of Przemyśl and public notary of the Holy See. Hussowczyk served the Grand Treasurer of the Crown Andrzej Kościelecki and prepared his last will when he was one death bed in Pszczyna in 1515.

Next Hussowczyk became a courtier of Grand Chancellor of Lithuania Mikołaj Radzwiłł. At his request Hussowczyk prepared the last will of Radzwiłł's cousin Zofia Sudymuntówna in 1518. In 1521 he travelled to Rome with a stuffed European bison, which was supposed to be a gift from Mikołaj Radzwiłł to Pope Leo X. In Rome, Hussowczyk met Erazm Ciołek, the Bishop of Płock. At this occasion Hussowczyk prepared Carmen de statura...bisontis. Sadly both gifts turned out to be redundant, because pope died in December 1521, before giving the audience.

Ciołek died in 1522 and Radzwiłł's a year before, so Hussowczyk deprived of a patron settled down in Kraków, where he probably had his ordination.

Hussowczyk was active in both the Crown and Lithuania, along with his uncertain birthplace, modern Polish, Lithuanian and Belarusian researchers tend to ascribe works of Hussowczyk to their respective cultural heritages.

== Works ==
Per the scope of his literary works, Hussowczyk is considered to be the founder of the Belarusian Renaissance literary tradition, and author of the oldest examples of Polish-Latin poetry of the early Renaissance. Hussowczyk wrote in publicistical, epic, heroic, lyrical, historical and satirical genres.

His Latin poem Carmen de statura, feritate ac venatione bisontis ("A Song about the Appearance, Savagery and Hunting of the Bison", Kraków 1523) is considered to be the first large scale fictional work about Medieval Lithuania (or Belarus), describing the bison's life and habits, Lithuania's landscape and the relationship of its inhabitants with the environment. Written in Latin for Pope Leo X, an avid hunter, the poem stems from Hussowczyk's experience in hunting and observing bison, and contains no literary comparisons with ancient legendary creatures. Due to the deaths of both the Pope and Hussowczyk's patron, bishop Ciołek, the poem was eventually presented to Polish Queen Bona in Kraków. According to Polish researcher Edmund Kotarski, Hussowczyk belonged to the circle of Polish-Latin poets of the early Renaissance.

His best known works are:

- Carmen de statura feritate ac venatione bisontis (English: The Song about Bison, Its Stature, Ferocity and Hunt), written in Classical Latin, 1522.
- Nova et miranda victoria de Turcis mense Iulio (New and famous victory over Turks in month of July), written in one day, under the impression from the victory of the Polish Great Hetman of the Crown Mikołaj Firlej over Turks by Trembowla on July 2, 1524.
- De vita et gestis Divi Hyacinthi (Life and feats of St. Hyacynth), about Polish Saint Hyacinth (1525).

== See also ==
- Renaissance in Poland
