= Rogóżno =

Rogóźno
- Village
- Location within Poland
- Coordinates: 50°4′30″N 22°22′24″E
- Country: Poland
- Voivodeship: Subcarpathian
- County: Łańcut
- Gmina: Łańcut
- Population: 1,200

Rogóżno [rɔˈɡuʐnɔ] is a village in the administrative district of Gmina Łańcut, within Łańcut County, Subcarpathian Voivodeship, in south-eastern Poland.
