= Głuchów, Podkarpackie Voivodeship =

Głuchów
- Village
- Location within Poland
- Coordinates: 50°5′N 22°16′E
- Country: Poland
- Voivodeship: Subcarpathian
- County: Łańcut
- Gmina: Łańcut
- Population: 1,500

Głuchów [ˈɡwuxuf] is a village in the administrative district of Gmina Łańcut, within Łańcut County, Subcarpathian Voivodeship, in south-eastern Poland.
