= Cierpisz, Łańcut County =

Cierpisz
- Village
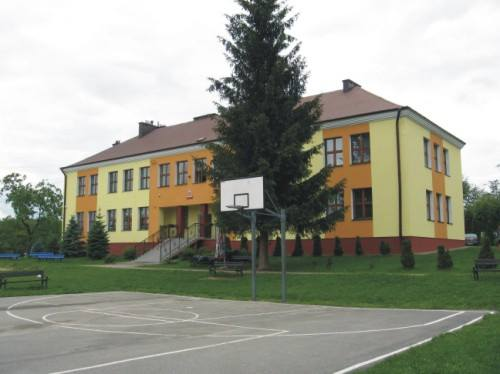
- Elementary school

- Location within Poland
- Coordinates: 50°1′N 22°10′E
- Country: Poland
- Voivodeship: Subcarpathian
- County: Łańcut
- Gmina: Łańcut

Population
  - Total: 790
- Time zone: UTC+1 (CET)
  - Summer (DST): UTC+2 (CEST)
- Vehicle registration: RLA

Cierpisz [ˈt͡ɕɛrpiʂ] is a village in the administrative district of Gmina Łańcut, within Łańcut County, Subcarpathian Voivodeship, in south-eastern Poland.

== History ==
The first mention of the village dates back to 1624 and is contained in the document issued by the then owner Kraczkowa, Zbigniew Alexander Kornyakt.

Five Polish citizens were murdered by Nazi Germany in the village during World War II.
