= Sonina =

- Village
- Saint John the Baptist church in Sonina

- Location within Poland
- Coordinates: 50°3′44″N 22°16′12″E
- Country: Poland
- Voivodeship: Subcarpathian
- County: Łańcut
- Gmina: Łańcut

Population
  - Total: 2,836
- Time zone: UTC+1 (CET)
  - Summer (DST): UTC+2 (CEST)

Sonina [sɔˈnina] is a village in the administrative district of Gmina Łańcut, within Łańcut County, Subcarpathian Voivodeship, in south-eastern Poland.

Five Polish citizens were murdered by Nazi Germany in the village during World War II.
