= Handzlówka =

- Village
- Location within Poland
- Coordinates: 49°59′N 22°14′E
- Country: Poland
- Voivodeship: Subcarpathian
- County: Łańcut
- Gmina: Łańcut
- Population (approx.): 1,500

Handzlówka [xand͡zˈlufka] is a village in the administrative district of Gmina Łańcut, within Łańcut County, Subcarpathian Voivodeship, in south-eastern Poland.

== See also ==
- Walddeutsche
