= Wysoka, Podkarpackie Voivodeship =

Wysoka
- Village
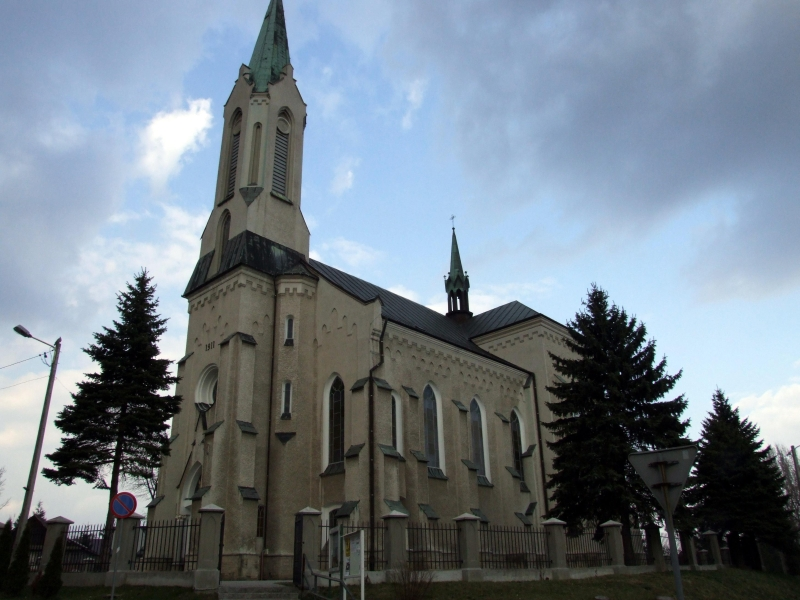
- Church of Saints Margaret and Valentine

- Location within Poland
- Coordinates: 50°2′41″N 22°15′12″E
- Country: Poland
- Voivodeship: Subcarpathian
- County: Łańcut
- Gmina: Łańcut

Population
  - Total: 2,400

Wysoka [vɨˈsɔka] is a village in the administrative district of Gmina Łańcut, within Łańcut County, Subcarpathian Voivodeship, in south-eastern Poland.
