= Olga Abramova (politician, born 1953) =

Belarusian politician and political scientist (born 1943)

- Вольга Абрамава

Member of the House of Representatives of Belarus
- In office 21 November 2000 – 27 October 2008

Member of the Supreme Council of the Republic
- In office 9 January 1996 – 9 January 2001

Personal details
- Born: Olga Mikhailovna Abramova; 19 September 1953 (age 73) Minsk, Byelorussian SSR, Soviet Union
- Education: Belarusian State University

Olga Mikhailovna Abramova (Belarusian: Вольга Міхайлаўна Абрамава; Russian: О́льга Миха́йловна Абра́мова; born 19 September 1953) is a Belarusian political scientist and politician. A Candidate of Sciences in philosophy, Abramova was member of the House of Representatives from 2000 until 2008, and member of the Supreme Council of the Republic from 1996 to 2001. Although a pro-Russian politician, Ambramova is also a supporter of good relations between Belarus and the West. In her opinion, Alexander Lukashenko's policy enjoys the support of the majority of society. Abramova is critical of some of the leaders of the Belarusian opposition.

== Early life ==
Abramova was born on 19 September 1953 in Minsk, Byelorussian SSR, in the Soviet Union. In 1975, she graduated from the Belarusian State University, receiving education as a sociologist and philosopher. In 1988, she obtained the degree of Candidate of Philosophical Sciences (equivalent to a PhD). The topic of her candidacy thesis was: The humanism of using coercive measures in the socialist revolution. She lectured at the Belarusian State Technological University and the Belarusian State University of Informatics and Radioelectronics, and was gradually promoted from assistant to associate professor. In 1995 and from 1997, she was the director of research programs of the National Center for Strategic Initiatives "East-West". She worked as the director of scientific and educational programs of the "Strategia" analytical center. Abramova speaks German.

== Career ==
=== Start of socio-political activity ===
At the end of the 1980s, Abramova became active in socio-political life. She opposed the transition of the education system to the Belarusian language and strongly opposed the law on languages adopted on 26 January 1990 at the 14th session of the Supreme Soviet, which provided for the establishment of Belarusian as the only state language. She advocated that the Byelorussian SSR should have two state languages: Belarusian and Russian. In 1991–1994 she was co-chair of the Movement for Democratic Reforms of Belarus. She also served as co-chair of the international Democratic Reform Movement.

=== Member of the Supreme Council (1996–2001) ===
In the second round of supplementary parliamentary elections on 10 December 1995, Abramova was elected member of the Supreme Council of Belarus of the 13th term from the Academic Electoral District No. 242 of the city of Minsk. On 19 December 1995, she was registered by the Central Electoral Commission, and on 9 January 1996, she was sworn in as a deputy. From 23 January, she served in the Supreme Council as a member, and then as secretary of the Standing Committee for International Affairs. Abramova was non-partisan; she belonged to the social democratic faction "Labour Union". From June 3, she was a member of the working group of the Supreme Council for cooperation with the Bundestag of Germany. On 21 June, she became a member of the council's delegation to the Parliamentary Assembly of the Community of Belarus and Russia. In November 1996, during the political crisis related to the referendum initiated by President Alexander Lukashenko, Abramova spoke out against the president, and supported the motion to impeach him. On 27 November 1996, after the president's controversial and partly internationally unrecognized change to the constitution, she was not a member of the House of Representatives of the first term. However, she also sharply criticized the opposition. According to the Constitution of Belarus of 1994, her mandate as a deputy to the Supreme Council ended on 9 January 2001; however, subsequent elections to this body were never held.

In 1997, she founded and headed the Belarusian Public Union "Yabloko", which brought together Russian-speaking democrats, was centrist, social-liberal in nature and was established with the support of the Russian Yabloko party. The organization coordinated its activities with the Coordination Council of Democratic Forces (RKSD), a body uniting the Belarusian opposition, within the Consultative Council of Opposition Political Parties, through the OSCE Consultation and Observation Mission. In the second half of 1999 and the first half of 2000, the organization led by Abramova participated in talks with the authorities on the democratization of the electoral code before the 2000 parliamentary elections. Representatives of Yabloko participated in the talks until the very end, until July 2000, even after the main opposition parties withdrew from them. Belarusian state media referred to the organization as a "constructive opposition".

=== Member of the House of Representatives (2000–2008) ===
Ambramova and her organization did not join the boycott of the parliamentary elections announced on 2 July by the 4th Congress of the RKSD. She put forward her candidacy and on 21 November 2000 and she became a member of the House of Representatives of the 2nd term from the Eastern Electoral District No. 106 of the city of Minsk. She thus became one of two people, next to Vladimir Novosiad, who were elected to the Chamber and who had previously belonged to the opposition in the Supreme Council of the 13th term. Due to her participation in the elections, supporters of the boycott considered her a "pseudo-democrat". Shortly after being elected to the Chamber, Abramova joined the pro-presidential camp. She served as a member of the Committee on Legislation and Judicial and Legal Issues. She belonged to the parliamentary group "Supporting Economic Development". She was one of two deputies, alongside Iwan Paszkiewicz, who reacted to the letter sent on 3 March 2001 by the leaders of the four main Protestant Churches in Belarus. In the letter, they criticized the new version of the law on freedom of religion, according to which the registration of religious associations was made more difficult, and also expressed concern about the particularly privileged position of the Russian Orthodox Church. The remaining deputies, like members of the Council of the Republic and Alexander Lukashenko, ignored the letter.

Abramova took part in the parliamentary elections in 2004. According toJuryja Czawusaua, during the election campaign, she exceeded the funds allocated for agitation by disseminating reports on her parliamentary activities for deputies of the House of Representatives of the second term. There were no cases of the authorities confiscating her election materials, which was the case with the materials of opposition candidates. On 16 November 2004, she became a member of the House of Representatives of the 3rd term from the Kalinowski Electoral District No. 108 of the city of Minsk. She served as a member of the Standing Committee on State Construction, Local Government and Regulations. According to Alaksander Piatkiewicz and Wolf Rubinczyk, in the House of Representatives she showed "moderate opposition", i.e. she spoke out against individual repressive actions of the executive power. On 29 June 2005, she was the only member of parliament who voted against the law on social organizations, which, among others, facilitated their liquidation, made registration and operation more difficult, and prohibited the activities of unregistered organizations. Her term in the House of Representatives ended on 27 October 2008.

On 30 May 2007, Abramova announced the liquidation of the Belarusian Public Union "Yabloko". The reason was two warnings from the Ministry of Justice due to the lack of a legal address for the union. Abramova had stopped renting an office for the union several years earlier due to lack of funds.

== Views ==
According to Abramova, Belarusian national identity consists primarily in the bond with the native land and love for native landscapes. She does not consider the community of Slavs to be an important factor, because in her opinion it is only a community of blood, while the Slavic nations have different cultures and are heading in different directions. However, there is a community of nations of the former Soviet Union, from which Abramova excludes Lithuania, Latvia and Estonia, but includes Israelis coming from the territory of the former USSR.

Abramova describes herself as a pro-Russian but also pro-European politician. It declares support for maintaining a pragmatic balance between Eastern and Western policies in order to achieve benefits for the country. In her opinion, it is convenient and expedient for Belarus to remain in a military-political alliance with Russia, as well as other organizations in which it is involved, such as the Shanghai Cooperation Organization. However, she stipulates that Belarus should not be part of Russia, as it is advisable for it to also develop good relations with the West. She describes Russia's policy towards Belarus as pragmatic, consistent with its national and state interests and the will of the majority of Russian society. However, she assesses the policy of Poland, Lithuania and Ukraine in this area very negatively. In her opinion, it does not meet the interests of these countries, and the local political elites are conducting it against the will of the majority of their citizens.

Europe, in Abramova's opinion, is a community of cultural and civilizational values to which Belarus belongs from the point of view of geography and history, but not in terms of dominant social thought. Belarus should strive to achieve European standards in the field of quality and comfort of life, as well as social security, but should not adopt some civic values. Abramova criticizes what she considers to be too much trust of Europeans in the information provided in the media, their materialistic lifestyle and excessive bureaucracy. According to her, Europeans do not understand the specificity of Belarus and its peculiar national character. She considers European integration to be a generally beneficial process, because European integration is better than economic autarky. Belarus could contribute to it primarily in the fields of culture and science. The ideal variant would be the integration of Russia with European structures. However, in the foreseeable future, Belarus should not make a civilizational choice and wait for the final development of the international order. Abramova explains the negative attitude of the European Union towards Belarusian authorities as a lack of understanding of the processes taking place in the country. In her opinion, the EU's policy is shaped by a part of the Belarusian opposition, which in fact does not want any changes. Abramova also criticizes the EU for the lack of specific material incentives for integration with it.

According to Abramova, Belarusian state media idealize the situation in the country, while non-state media exaggerate criticism. In order to avoid a false, one-sided image of Belarus, both sources should be treated with caution. She claims that both political and economic changes are taking place in the country, but we should be more patient while waiting for them. In her opinion, Lukashenko's policies, both domestic and foreign, have the support of the majority of Belarusian society. She is very critical of some of the Belarusian opposition leaders who have turned politics into business. In her opinion, despite loud declarations, they do not want Belarus to be democratized and open to the world, because their current status is comfortable for them. According to Abramova, they shape the European Union's policy towards Belarus.

Abramova describes herself as choleric and extrovert.

== Commentary ==
Abramova was described as a "pseudo-democrat" by supporters of the boycott of the 2000 parliamentary elections. This happened so that, when the majority of the opposition supported the boycott and Abramova did not join it, she would put forward her candidacy and win the seat as a deputy. Brian Bennett described her in this context as Lukashenko's favorite oppositionist. Zianon Pazniak has been critical of her, calling her a polytrusifier from Lukashenko's "patka". According to political scientist Iryna Yekadumava, the "Yabloko" organization she led—after right-wing parties refused to contact the authorities that they considered illegal—had a chance in 2001 to capture the electorate of centrist forces, represented by the middle class, intelligentsia, part of the nomenklatura and employees of the state apparatus.
