= Aleksandr Potupa =

Belarusian philosopher, writer, scientist, and human rights activist

Alexander S. Potupa Аляксандр Патупа
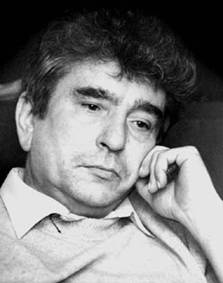
- Born: March 21, 1945; Sevastopol
- Died: June 1, 2009 (aged 64); Minsk, Belarus
- Citizenship: Belarus
- Spouse: Lubov N. Potupa (b. 1955)
- Children: Elena Potoupa (b. 1975) and Andrei Potupa (b. 1976)
- Website: Potupa

Alexander Sergeevich Potupa (Belarusian: Аляксандр Сяргеевіч Патупа; Russian: Александр Серге́евич Потупа; March 21, 1945 – June 1, 2009) was a Belarusian philosopher, writer, scientist and human rights activist.

== Biography ==
Alexander Sergeevich Potupa was born in Sevastopol, Russia on March 21, 1945, eventually moving to Yeysk, where he went to school. He also became a chess master. From 1961 until his death, he lived in Minsk, Belarus.

In 1967 he graduated from Moscow State University with MS in Nuclear Physics, Quantum Field Theory. In 1970 he received PhD in Theoretical Physics & Mathematics. By the time of his death Potupa had published approximately 50 works, made 30 appearances at international and national conferences in the areas of nuclear physics, high energy physics, cosmology, electrodynamics, and has done research work at Physics Institute and Belarusian State University.

Soon after the collapse of the Soviet Union Potupa decided to open a private company. Prior to 1988, there were only public/government businesses. From 1989 until 1996, Potupa was the President /Founder of Publishing & Printing Company "Eridan", which was the first Private publishing & printing company to open in Belarus. "Eridan", won the – Torch of Birmingham awarded for survival in a rough economic environment.

Since 1992 he was a President of Future Studies Center (forecast and social research) where he had performed over 15 complex expert social polls. Potupa published over 100 publications and articles and made over 60 appearances in international and national conferences in the area of forecasting, sociology, political science, economics, and law.

In 1995 he received a PhD in Philosophy & Futurology (strategic forecasting and information technology). Professor. Dr. Potupa was also a researcher and lecturer in futures studies. His specialty was in strategic forecasting, globalization, futurogenic causality, models for Belarus & CIS development, sociology, cosmology, strategy for science.

He died unexpectedly on June 1, 2009, at the Borovliani Hospital during a lung cancer treatment. The cause of death is thrombus, a blood clot, which separated from his leg blocking path to both of his lungs.

== Occupation and memberships ==
Occupations:

- President of Center for Future Studies (1992–2009)
- President of BAE – Belarusian Association of Entrepreneurs (2001–2007), Honorable President of BAE (2008)
- President /Founder of Publishing & Printing Company "Eridan" (1989–1996), 1st Private publishing & printing company in Belarus.

Professional and other memberships:

- IAIPT (in Russian) (International Academy of Informational Processes and Technologies)
- IALBA (International Academy of Leaders in Business & Administration)
- NYAS (New York Academy of Science)
- NGS (National Geographic Society)
- WFS (World Future Society)
- AAAS (American Association for the Advancement of Science)
- IPC (International Pen Club)
- BAJ (Belarusian Association of Journalists)
- BATT (Belarusian Association of Think Tanks)
- Charter 97
- ADNGOB (Assembly of Democratic Non-Governmental Organizations of Belarus)
- Chairman of the BHRC (in Russian) (Belarusian Human Rights Convention)
- Chairman of the Belarusian Helsinki-XXI
- Coordinating Council of BEA (Belarusian Euro-Atlantic Association)

== Science and publications ==
His publications would include diverse topics in Nuclear physics, cosmology, science history, forecasting and many others.

- "Idealized Measuring Procedures in Quantum Theory" (in Russian) (1970);
- "Running to Infinity" (in Russian) (1977);
- "Fantacrime – XXI" (in Russian) (1989);
- "Contact, or Some Thoughts & Dialogs heard at Wintry Long Night of the 21st Century" (in Russian) (1990);
- "Discovery of Universe – Past, Present, Future" (in Russian) (1991);
- "Something Unimaginable" (in Russian) (1992)
- 5 more books
- More than 200 articles (in Russian)

== Awards ==
- Recipient Torch of Birmingham (1995)
- International Man of Year (Cambridge, England, 1998)
- Best Analytical Material of the Year (BAJ, Minsk, Belarus, 1999) (in Belarusian)
- Outstanding People of 20th Century (Cambridge, England, 1999)
- For High Achievements in a Science (IAIT, Minsk, Belarus, 2004)
- For High Achievements in a Science (gold medal, IAIT, Minsk, Belarus, 2005)

== Personal info ==
- Married, 2 kids
- Wife (Lubov N. Potupa, 1955, manager)
- Daughter (Elena A. Potoupa, 1975, JD International Law, BS Physics, MBA International Business, president/owner of Wow Things, Inc., NJ, US, Internet-"Oscar"-2005 Golden Link Award)
- Son (Andrei A. Potupa, 1976, JD international law, manager, journalist)
- Grandson (Antony, 2002)

== Scholarship ==
- In 2009, Elena Potoupa, daughter of Alexander S. Potupa, has established the Dr. Alexander S. Potupa Memorial Scholarship in memory of her late father, a Belarusian writer, philosopher, scientist and civil activist. The scholarship supports international business students.
