= Uladzimir Konan =

Belarusian philosopher

Uladzimir Konan (1934 in Hrodna, Belarus – 6 June 2011) was a Belarusian philosopher. He was born in the Hrodna region of Belarus. He graduated from Belarusian State University's History faculty and worked with the Institute of Philosophy and Law of the Belarusian National Academy of Sciences.
