= Oleg Manaev =

Belarusian sociologist

Oleg Manaev Алег Манаеў Олег Манаев
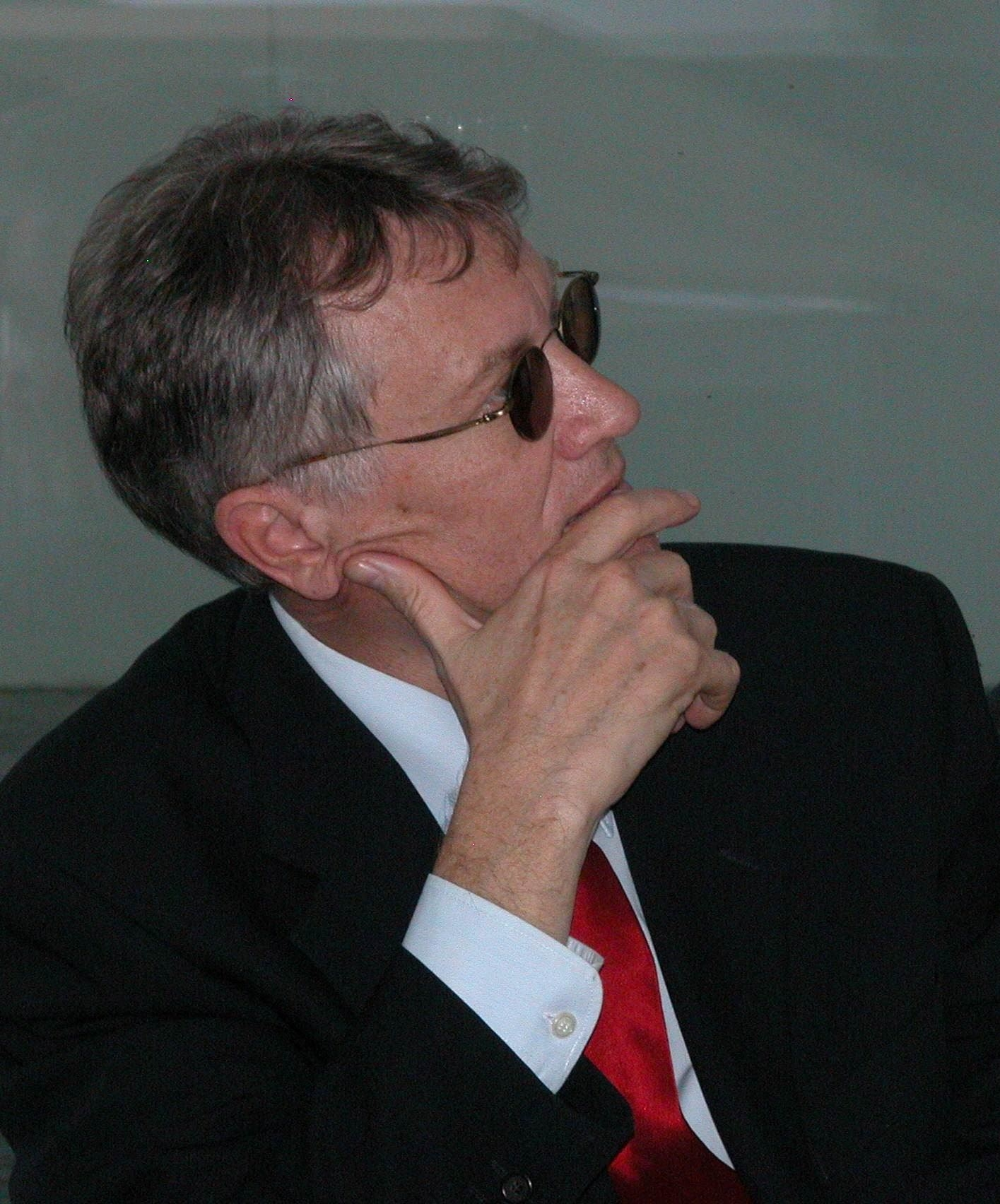
- Born: February 3, 1952; Vladivostok, Russia
- Citizenship: Belarus
- Education: Belarusian State University
- Known for: Founding and heading the Independent Institute of Socio-Economic & Political Studies (IISEPS); Founding of “Information & Communication” program and Department of Social Communication in the School of Philosophy and Social Sciences at the Belarusian State University; Founding the Belarusian Association of Think Tanks (BTT); Authoring and editing books on mass media, communication and democracy, civil society and political process in the USSR, Belarus and abroad;
- Scientific career
- Fields: Sociology, Political Science, Communication Studies

Oleg Manaev (Belarusian: Алег Цімафеевіч Манаеў; Russian: Олег Тимофеевич Манаев; born February 3, 1952, in Vladivostok, USSR) is a well-known Belarusian sociologist and public person.

== Career ==
He graduated from the School of Journalism at the Belarusian State University in 1974, got Ph.D. in 1983, and Dr. Habilitate (Professor) in Sociology in 1991. Published over 180 scholarly articles, and edited dozen books on mass media, communication and democracy, civil society and political process in the USSR, Belarus and abroad (USA, Brazil, Korea, Canada, South Africa, Australia, and Europe).

Manaev was teaching, lecturing and doing research as Visiting Professor and Fellow at various universities and institutes in the US (including Fulbright Program), Canada, Brazil, and many European countries. He also managed dozens of national and international projects, and organized dozens of national and international conferences and seminars. Based on the cooperation with Western scholars in media and communication in 1996 founded a new Program “Information & Communication”, and in 1997 a new Department of Social Communication in the School of Philosophy and Social Sciences at the Belarusian State University.

In 1990 he was co-founder of the United Democratic Party of Belarus (now United Civic Party), the first officially registered alternative to the Communist Party in the BSSR. In 1992 became a Founding Chairman of the Belarusian Soros Foundation (BSF), and coordinated oversight of dozens of research, education, media and public policy programs. Due to its contribution to independent education, social sciences, and civil society development BSF faced various pressures from the state authorities, and in September 1997 was shut down by the Supreme Court.

In 1992 Manaev founded and headed the Independent Institute of Socio-Economic & Political Studies (IISEPS) – the first independent think tank in post-Communist Belarus. Due to its contribution to independent social sciences and democratic public policy IISEPS also faced various pressures from the state authorities, including KGB, Ministry of Justice, General Prosecutor Office, Ministry of Interior, and the Supreme Court. After shutting down by the Supreme Court in April 2005 the Institute had to remove its legal status to Vilnius (Lithuania) but continues its mission in Belarus as a group of private experts.

In 1997 he founded and chaired the Belarusian Association of Think Tanks (BTT), united almost 100 researchers and analysts in sociology, economics, philosophy, psychology, and political science from 18 independent research and analytical centers across the country. Due to its contribution to independent social sciences and democratic public policy BTT faced various pressures from the state authorities, and in August 2006 was shut down by the Supreme Court as well.

In 1990s and 2000s Manaev consulted various structures of civil society in Belarus including the Coordinating Council of Democratic Forces, Belarusian Union of Employers and Businessmen, Young Front, Independent TV Network, and others.

He was a member of the Soviet (SSA) and then Belarusian Sociological Association (BSA), International Association for Mass Communication Research (IAMCR) and its International Council (nominated its Vice-President in 1996). Now is a member of the World Association for Public Opinion Research (WAPOR), and American Political Science Association (APSA).

He was also Editorial Board member of Intercome (Brazil), European Journal of Communication (UK), Analytical Bulletin of the Belarusian Think Tanks (Belarus), Political Communication (USA), and IISEPS News (Belarus-Lithuania).

== Bibliography ==
Manaev's books (authored and edited) include:

- Mass Media Effectiveness (Minsk, 1986)
- Interaction of Media, Public and Power in Democratization Process (Russian/English, Minsk, 1991)
- Media in Transition: from Totalitarianism to Democracy (English, Kiev, 1993)
- Guidebook for Information and Communication Studies at the Belarusian State University, vol. I-III (Minsk, 1997)
- Belarusian Association of Think Tanks. A Comprehensive Directory of Independent Research and Analytical Centers in Belarus (Russian/English, Minsk, 1998)
- Youth and Civil Society: a Case of Belarus (Minsk, 1999)
- Emerging of Civil Society in Independent Belarus. Sociological Experiences: 1991–2000, vol. I (Minsk, 2000)
- Belarus on the Way to the Third Millennium (Minsk, 2001)
- Mass Media in Belarus (English, Dortmund, 2003)
- Recent Developments in Belarusian Politics, Society, and Media (English, Dortmund, 2004)
- Independent Research in Independent Belarus: Fighting for Reality (Novosibirsk, 2004)
- Emerging of Civil Society in Independent Belarus. Sociological Experiences: 2001–2005, vol. II (Riga, 2005)
- Presidential Elections in Belarus – from Limited Democracy to Unlimited Authoritarianism: 1994-2006 (Novosibirsk, 2006)
- Belarus and “wider Europe”: Quest for Geo-political Self-identification (Novosibirsk, 2007).

His recent publications include:

- “The “spiral of silence” in election campaigns in a post-Communist society: the case of Belarus”, in International Journal of Market Research, 2010, Vol. 52, Issue 3;
- “Belarus on “The Huntington Line”: the Role of Media”, in Marta Dyczok and Oxana Gaman-Golutvina, eds., Media, Democracy and Freedom: The Post-Communist Experience, Bern: Peter Lang, 2009;

As a sociologist and political analyst, editor, contributing columnist and TV/Radio commentator, Manaev published and broadcast numerous analytical articles in Belarusian and foreign media.

== Sources ==
- Manaeu Aleh Tsimafeyevich // Belarusian Encyclopedia [in 18 volumes]. – Minsk, 2000. – vol. 10. – p. 56 (Belarusian).
- Manaev Oleg Timofeyevich // Sociological Encyclopedia. – Minsk, 2003. - p. 187 (Russian).
- Manaev Oleg Timofeyevich // Sociology. Encyclopedia. – Minsk, Book House, 2003. - p. 525 (Russian).
- Manaev Oleg Timofeyevich // Who is Who in Belarus. – Minsk: Magic Book, 2004. - pp. 150–151 (Russian).
- Oleg Manaev // Fortunes. Part One.– Minsk: BAJ, 2006. – pp. 85–94 (Russian).
- Manaev Oleg Timofeyevich // Personalities of Belarusian sociology. e-directory
- "Oleg Manaev: The "Civil (Society) Constructor" Soldiers On / Karol Jakubowicz". Political Communication. 23 (4): 379–385. 2006.
- Oleg Manaev, sociologist and public person // eds. A. N. Alekseyev and R. I. Lenchovski. Profession - sociologist (From the experience of dramatic sociology). – St-P.: Norma, 2010. – pp. 487–499 (Russian).

== Last Events in life and career ==
- Knoxville News Sentinel About Oleg Manaev, 2007
- Knoxville News Sentinel About Oleg Manaev, 2008
- Rescue Scholar Foundation on Oleg Manaev, 2009
- UT Today about Oleg Manaev, 2009 on YouTube
- International Association for Media and Communication Research In support of Oleg Manaev, 2010
- European Communication Research and Education Association's appeal for Belarusian scholar Manaev, 2010
