= Nadezhda Abramova =

Belarusian anti-communist (born 1907)

- Надзея Абрамава
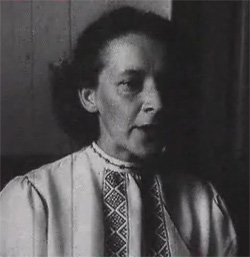
- Born: April 1907; Minsk Governorate, Russian Empire
- Died: 18 February 1979 (aged 71); Munich, West Germany
- Education: Maxim Tank Belarusian State Pedagogical University; Belarusian Medical Institute
- Known for: Founder of Union of Belarusian Youth
- Father: Alexander Abramov-Sushynski

Nadezhda Alexandrovna Abramova (Belarusian: Надзея Аляксандраўна Абрамава, Nadzieya Alyaksandrauna Abramava, 30 April 1907 – 18 February 1979) was a Belarusian nationalist politician, founder of the Union of Belarusian Youth, and was a member of the Russian apostolate in the Russian diaspora.

== Early life ==
Nadezhda Abramova was born on 30 April 1907, in Minsk Governorate. Her father, Alexander Abramov-Sushynski, was an artist and photographer. Abramova attended evening classes at Maxim Tank Belarusian State Pedagogical University and graduated from the Belarusian Medical Institute.

== Career ==
She worked at the University Psychiatric Clinic and during the German occupation, she combined her medical practice with social activities. From mid-1942, she led the abstract child custody in the Belarusian People's Self-Help.

In 1942, she secretly created the Union of Belarusian Youth, which was legalized by the occupation authorities in 1943. On 22 June 1943, Abramova was appointed one of the leaders of the Union of Belarusian Youth and organized courses for candidates to become managers, which made reports on health care, the principles of morality, and organisational tasks.

She was a regular contributor to the magazine Long Live Belarus. In 1943, she was appointed a member of the trust. She was a participant in the Second All-Belarusian Congress (27 June 1944) and in the summer of 1944, she fled to Germany and worked for the reduced management staff of the Belarusian Union of Youth Troopes. Abramova also coordinated with the leaders of the girls' camps and published a newsletter called "Learning List."

On 15 September 1944, she was co-opted into the Belarusian Central Rada in Berlin. After the war, she hid in a monastery. Then, she worked at the Munich Institute for the Study of the USSR and was engaged in matters of religion and atheism. Abramova participated in the Belarusian exile community and was considered to be involved in the Belarusian Central Rada, where she was elected as a delegate to its plenary sessions. Unfortunately, she did not record memories of her activities. She converted to Catholicism from Russian Orthodoxy, serving as an active parishioner of the Russian Catholic parish of the Byzantine Rite of Saint Nicholas in Munich. Abramova collaborated with Irina Posnova and was also a secretary of the Congress of Russian Catholics in Rome in 1950.

== Death ==
Nadezhda Abramova died on 18 February 1979, in Munich, Germany.

== Notes ==
- Life with God ": Archival Description Fund / Vladimir Kolupaev. Pro manoscritto. Seriate (Bg), Italia: " Russia Cristiana (Italian) Russian. ", 2009. 54 c.
