= Husów =

- Village
- Location within Poland
- Coordinates: 49°59′N 22°17′E
- Country: Poland
- Voivodeship: Subcarpathian
- County: Łańcut
- Gmina: Markowa
- Population: 2,000
- Website: http://www.husow.pl

Husów [ˈxusuf] is a village in the administrative district of Gmina Markowa, within Łańcut County, Subcarpathian Voivodeship, in south-eastern Poland.

== See also ==
- Walddeutsche
