= Kotulin =

Kotulin may refer to:

- Kotulin, Łódź Voivodeship, a village in the administrative district of Gmina Rogów, Poland
- Kotulin, Silesian Voivodeship, a village in the administrative district of Gmina Toszek, Poland
- Kotulin Mały, a village, Poland

== See also ==
- Freddy Kottulinsky (1932–2010), German-Swedish racing and rallying driver
