= Kotków, Gliwice County =

Kotków
- Hamlet
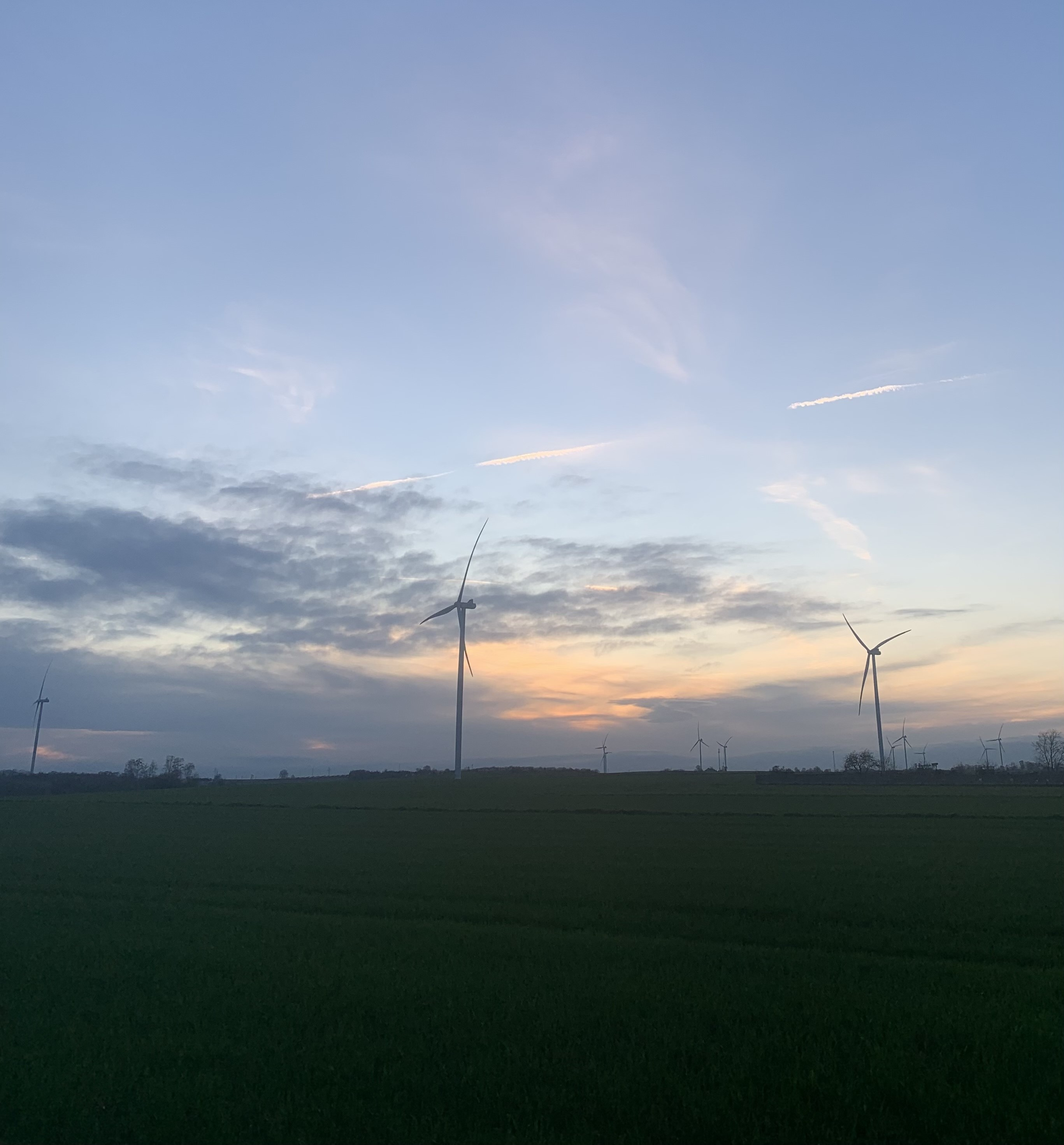
- Kotków, view of the Wielowieś Wind Power Plant (2024)

- Location within Poland
- Coordinates: 50°29′50″N 18°38′28″E
- Country: Poland
- Voivodeship: Silesian
- County: Gliwice
- Gmina: Wielowieś
- Elevation: 265 m (869 ft)

Kotków [ˈkɔtkuf] (German: Alsen, Silesian: Alzy) - a part of the village of Wielowieś in the administrative district of Gmina Wielowieś, within Gliwice County, Silesian Voivodeship, in southern Poland.

== History ==
Kotków was established in the 19th century as Alsen, it was a folwark (manorial farm) situated on a road between Wielowieś and Wojska. The name probably refers to the capture of the island of Als (German: Alsen) by Prussian forces during the Second Schleswig War
