= Ligota Toszecka =

- Village
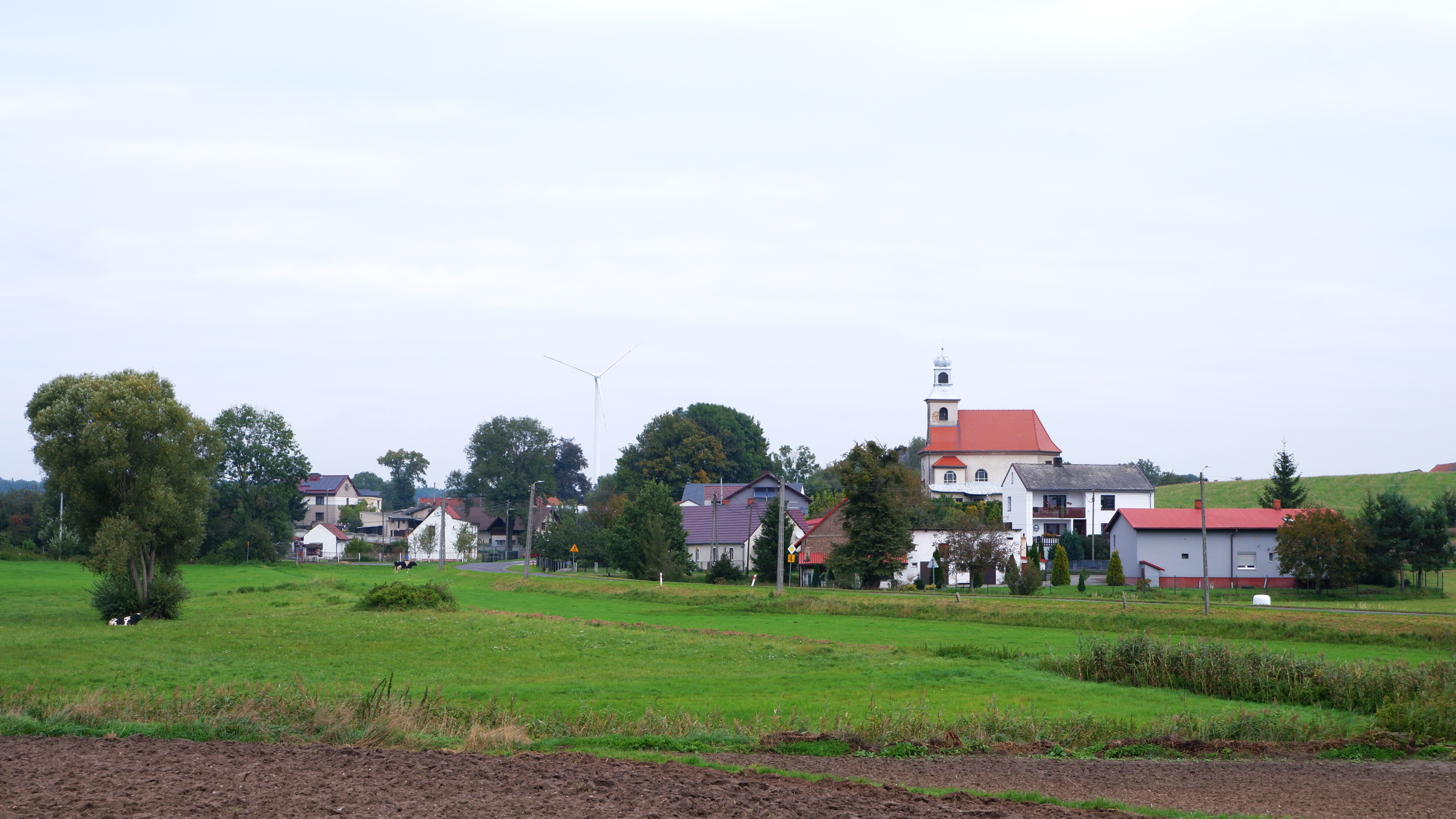

- Location within Poland
- Coordinates: 50°26′59″N 18°27′24″E
- Country: Poland
- Voivodeship: Silesian
- County: Gliwice
- Gmina: Toszek
- Population: 256

Ligota Toszecka [liˈɡɔta tɔˈʂɛt͡ska] is a village in the administrative district of Gmina Toszek, within Gliwice County, Silesian Voivodeship, in southern Poland.
