= Nieborowice =

- Village
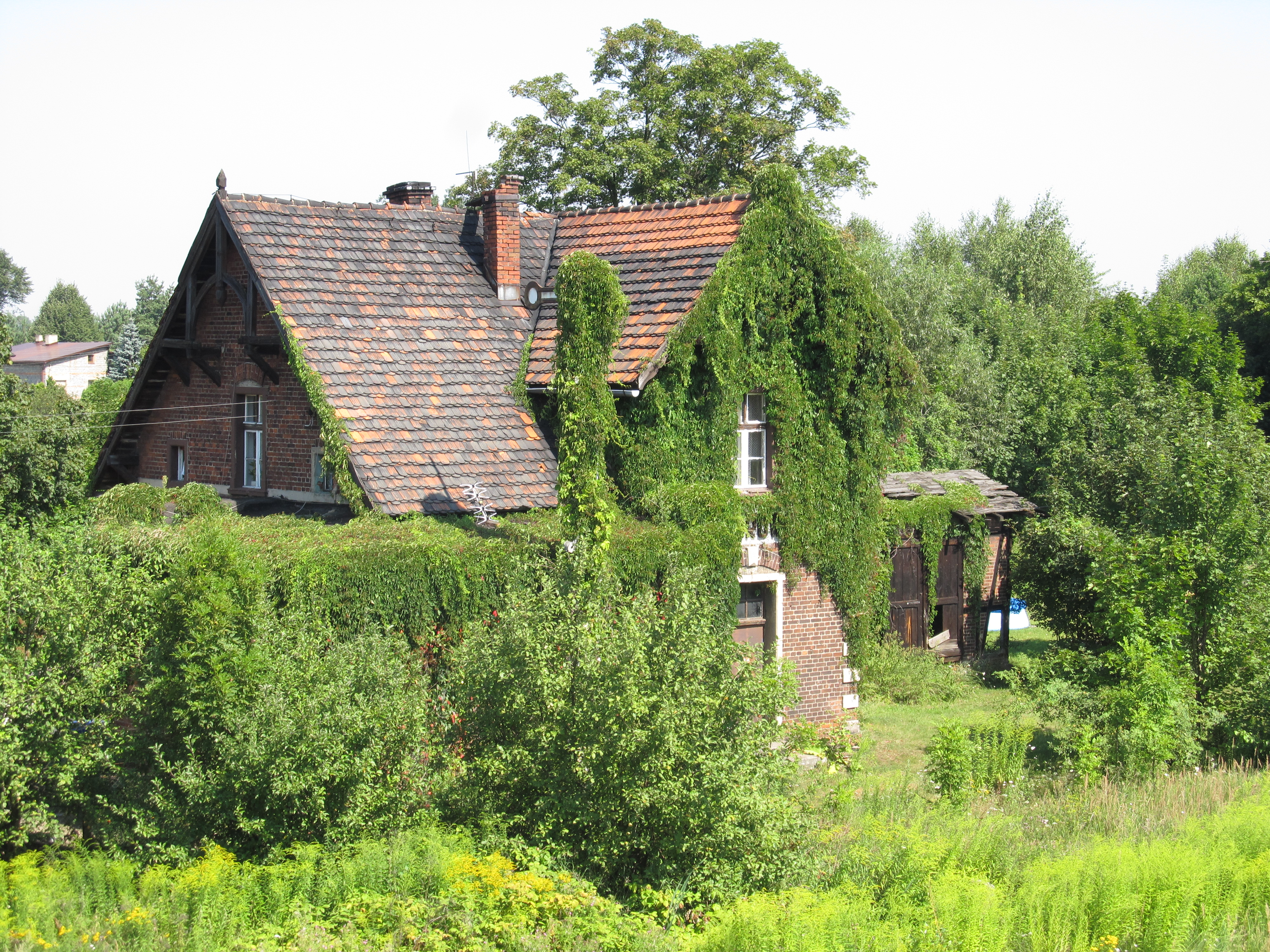
- Narrow-gauge railway station in Nieborowice

- Location within Poland
- Coordinates: 50°13′N 18°36′E
- Country: Poland
- Voivodeship: Silesian
- County: Gliwice
- Gmina: Pilchowice
- First mentioned: 1407
- Population: 723
- Time zone: UTC+1 (CET)
  - Summer (DST): UTC+2 (CEST)

Nieborowice [ɲɛbɔrɔˈvit͡sɛ] is a village in the administrative district of Gmina Pilchowice, within Gliwice County, Silesian Voivodeship, in southern Poland.

The oldest known mention of the village dates back to 1407. Historically it was inhabited by Poles. During World War II, in September 1939, Nieborowice was one of the sites of executions of Polish inhabitants by the Germans (see Nazi crimes against the Polish nation). The Germans also established a transit camp for Polish prisoners of war, as well as Polish activists and former insurgents.

There is a historic narrow-gauge railway station in the village.
