= Stanica, Silesian Voivodeship =

Stanica
- Village
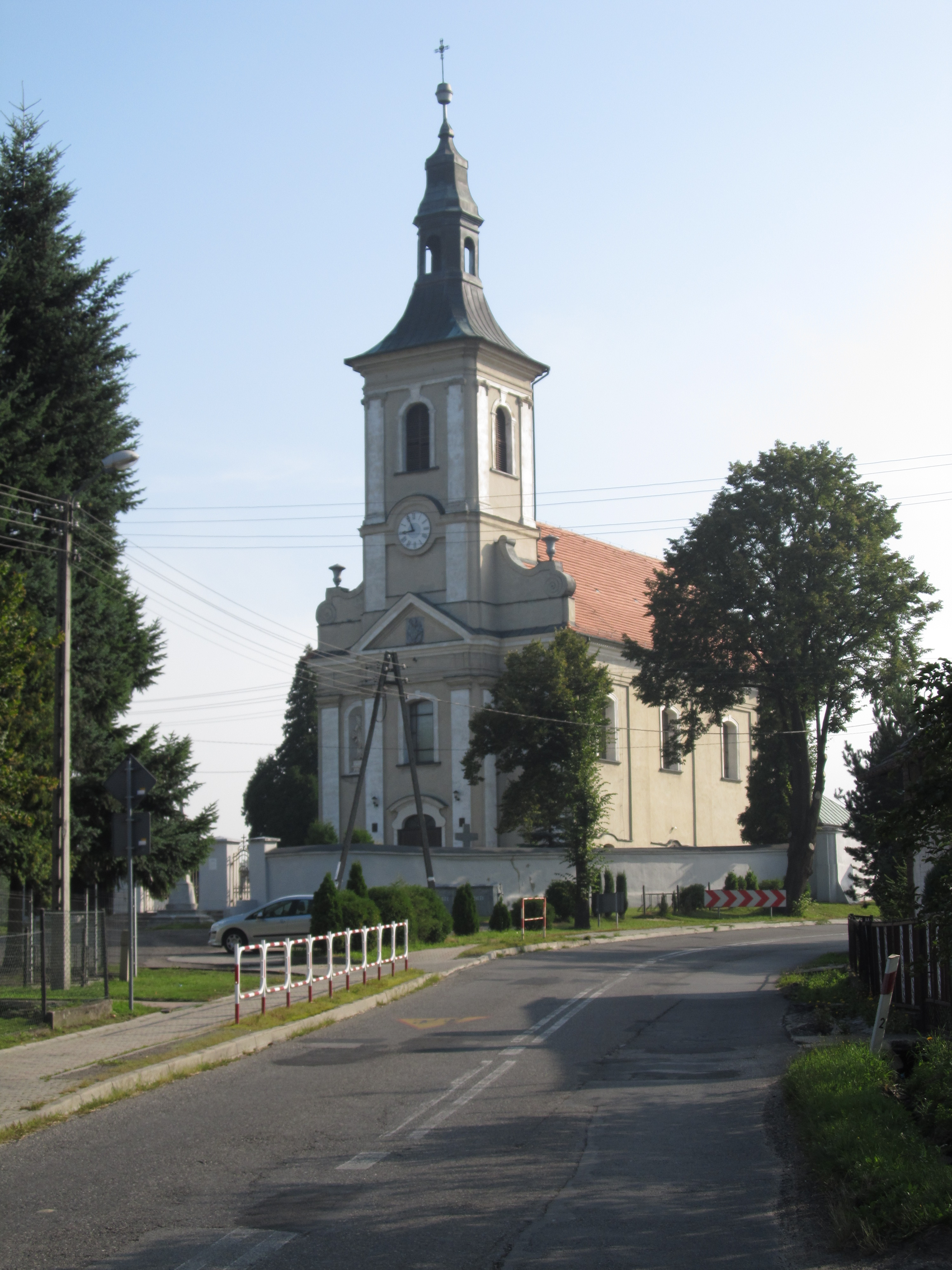
- Church of Saint Martin

- Location within Poland
- Coordinates: 50°12′20″N 18°30′46″E
- Country: Poland
- Voivodeship: Silesian
- County: Gliwice
- Gmina: Pilchowice

Population
  - Total: 1,307
- Website: http://www.stanica.pilchowice.pl/

Stanica [staˈnit͡sa] is a village in the administrative district of Gmina Pilchowice, within Gliwice County, Silesian Voivodeship, in southern Poland.
