= Czarków =

Czarków may refer to the following places in Poland:

- Czarków, Gliwice County, Silesian Voivodeship
- Czarków, Pszczyna County, Silesian Voivodeship
- Nowy Czarków, Greater Poland Voivodeship
