= Laura, Silesian Voivodeship =

Laura
- Village
- Location within Poland
- Coordinates: 50°27′N 18°26′E
- Country: Poland
- Voivodeship: Silesian
- County: Gliwice
- Gmina: Toszek

Laura [ˈlaura] is a village in the administrative district of Gmina Toszek, within Gliwice County, Silesian Voivodeship, in southern Poland.
