= Heinz Kunert =

German engineer and inventor

- Born: 25 March 1927
- Died: 6 April 2012 (aged 85)
- Occupations: Engineer, inventor

Heinz Kunert (25 March 1927, Sarnów, Gliwice County – 6 April 2012) was a German engineer and inventor.

== Life ==
Kunert studied philosophy, physics and psychology at University of Bonn. Kunert invented the first rear defogger for automobiles. From 1957 until 1992, he worked in Cologne for company Sekurit Glas-Union GmbH.
