= Paczynka =

- Village
- Location within Poland
- Coordinates: 50°24′N 18°35′E
- Country: Poland
- Voivodeship: Silesian
- County: Gliwice
- Gmina: Toszek
- Population: 156

Paczynka [paˈt͡ʂɨnka] is a village in the administrative district of Gmina Toszek, within Gliwice County, Silesian Voivodeship, in southern Poland.
