= Borowiany, Silesian Voivodeship =

Borowiany
- Village
- Location within Poland
- Coordinates: 50°32′33″N 18°36′11″E
- Country: Poland
- Voivodeship: Silesian
- County: Gliwice
- Gmina: Wielowieś
- Population: 139

Borowiany [bɔrɔˈvjanɨ] is a village in the administrative district of Gmina Wielowieś, within Gliwice County, Silesian Voivodeship, in southern Poland.
