= Kotliszowice =

- Village
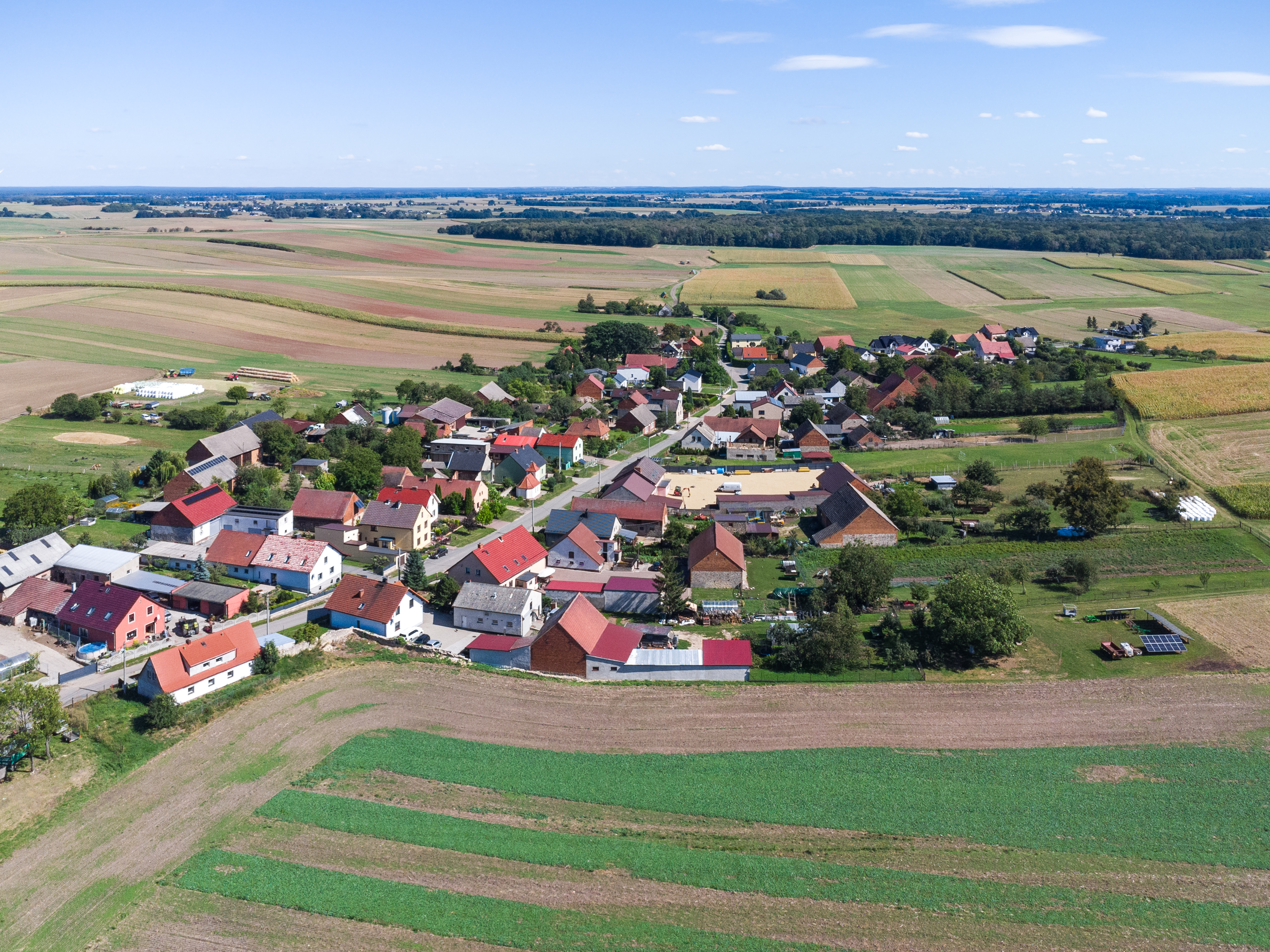
- Aerial view in 2026

- Location within Poland
- Coordinates: 50°28′N 18°33′E
- Country: Poland
- Voivodeship: Silesian
- County: Gliwice
- Gmina: Toszek
- Population: 286

Kotliszowice [kɔtliʂɔˈvit͡sɛ] is a village in the administrative district of Gmina Toszek, within Gliwice County, Silesian Voivodeship, in southern Poland.
