= Wrzosy, Gliwice County =

Wrzosy
- Village
- Location within Poland
- Coordinates: 50°23′N 18°33′E
- Country: Poland
- Voivodeship: Silesian
- County: Gliwice
- Gmina: Toszek

Wrzosy [ˈvʐɔsɨ] is a village in the administrative district of Gmina Toszek, within Gliwice County, Silesian Voivodeship, in southern Poland.
