= Sieroty =

- Village
- Aerial view

- Location within Poland
- Coordinates: 50°28′N 18°36′E
- Country: Poland
- Voivodeship: Silesian
- County: Gliwice
- Gmina: Wielowieś
- Population: 451

Sieroty [ɕɛˈrɔtɨ] is a village in Gmina Wielowieś, within Gliwice County, Silesian Voivodeship, in southern Poland.
