= Proboszczowice, Silesian Voivodeship =

Proboszczowice
- Village
- Location within Poland
- Coordinates: 50°26′3″N 18°24′44″E
- Country: Poland
- Voivodeship: Silesian
- County: Gliwice
- Gmina: Toszek
- Population: 201

Proboszczowice [prɔbɔʂt͡ʂɔˈvit͡sɛ] is a village in the administrative district of Gmina Toszek, within Gliwice County, Silesian Voivodeship, in southern Poland.
