= Żernica =

Village in Silesian Voivodeship, Poland

- Village
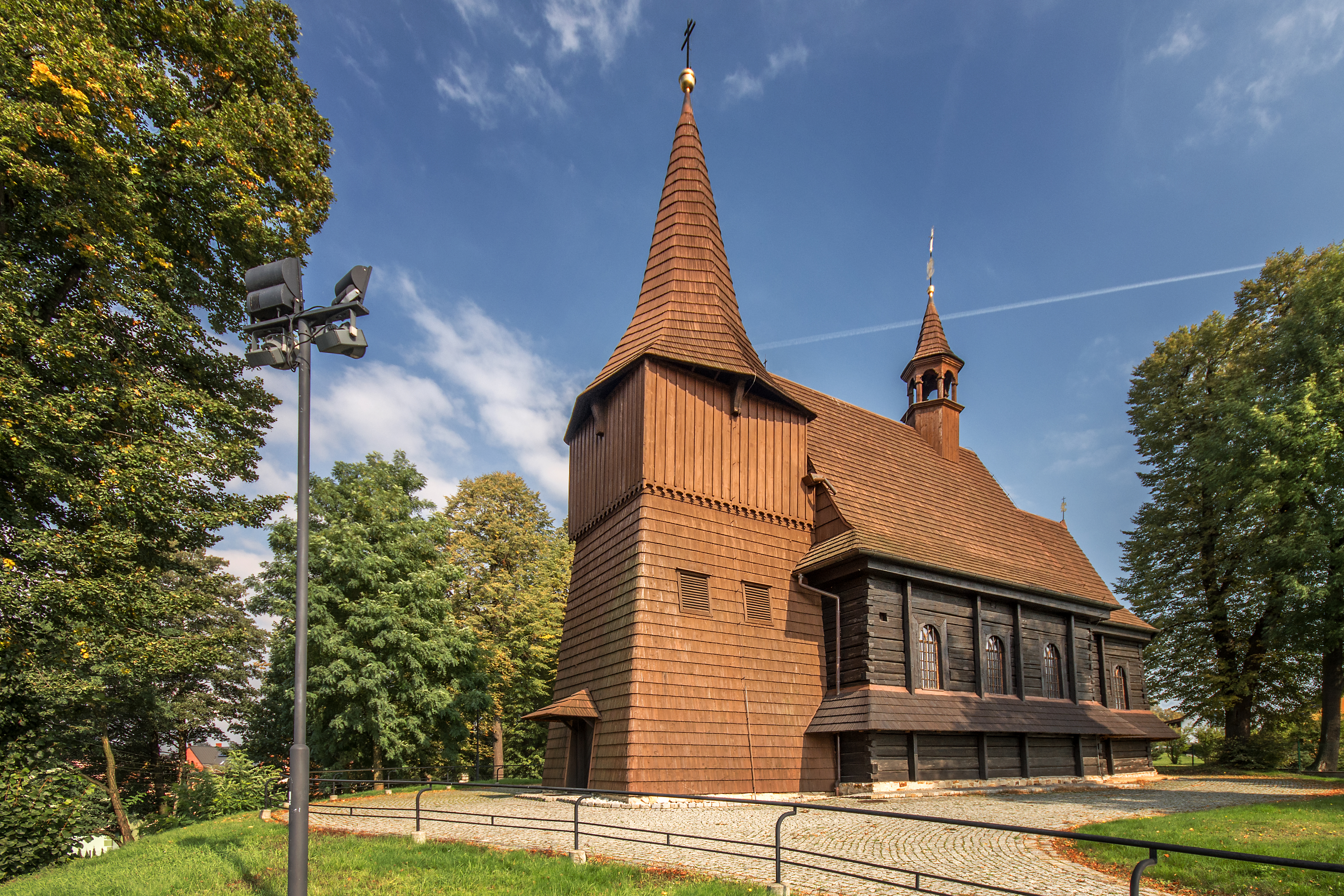
- Saint Michael, Archangel Church

- Location within Poland
- Coordinates: 50°14′N 18°36′E
- Country: Poland
- Voivodeship: Silesian Voivodeship
- County: Gliwice
- Gmina: Pilchowice
- Population: 2,549

Żernica [ʐɛrˈnit͡sa] is a village in the administrative district of Gmina Pilchowice, within Gliwice County, Silesian Voivodeship, in southern Poland.
