= Zacharzowice =

- Village
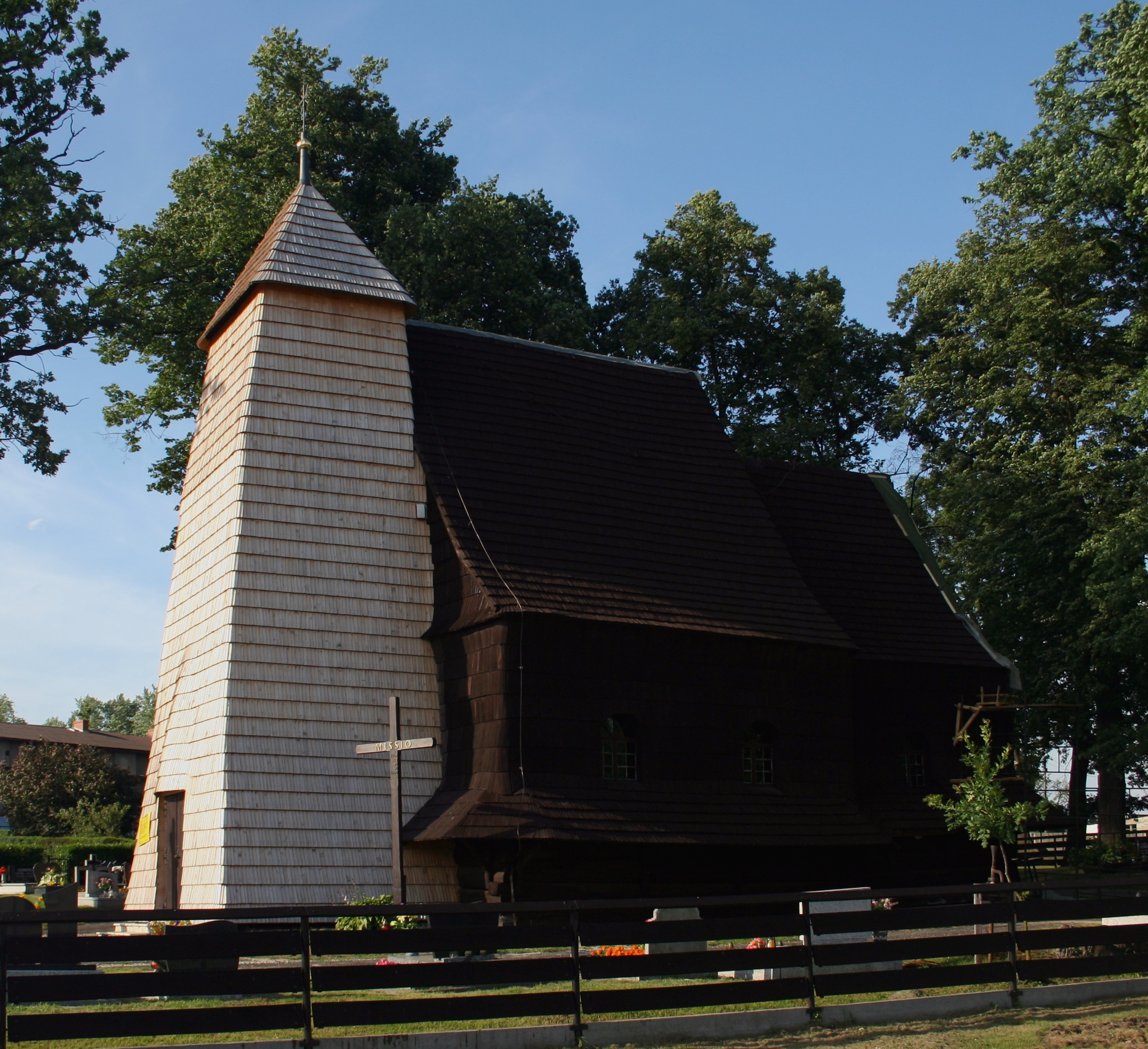
- Saint Lawrence Church

- Location within Poland
- Coordinates: 50°27′0″N 18°36′0″E
- Country: Poland
- Voivodeship: Silesian
- County: Gliwice
- Gmina: Wielowieś
- Population: 299

Zacharzowice [zaxaʐɔˈvit͡sɛ] is a village in the administrative district of Gmina Wielowieś, within Gliwice County, Silesian Voivodeship, in southern Poland.
