= Skały, Silesian Voivodeship =

Skały
- Village
- Location within Poland
- Coordinates: 50°28′32″N 18°23′23″E
- Country: Poland
- Voivodeship: Silesian
- County: Gliwice
- Gmina: Toszek

Skały [ˈskawɨ] (German Skaal) is a village in the administrative district of Gmina Toszek, within Gliwice County, Silesian Voivodeship, in southern Poland.
