= Łączki, Silesian Voivodeship =

Łączki
- Village
- Location within Poland
- Coordinates: 50°27′52″N 18°35′29″E
- Country: Poland
- Voivodeship: Silesian
- County: Gliwice
- Gmina: Toszek

Łączki [ˈwɔnt͡ʂki] is a village in the administrative district of Gmina Toszek, within Gliwice County, Silesian Voivodeship, in southern Poland.
