= Wilcza, Silesian Voivodeship =

Wilcza
- Village
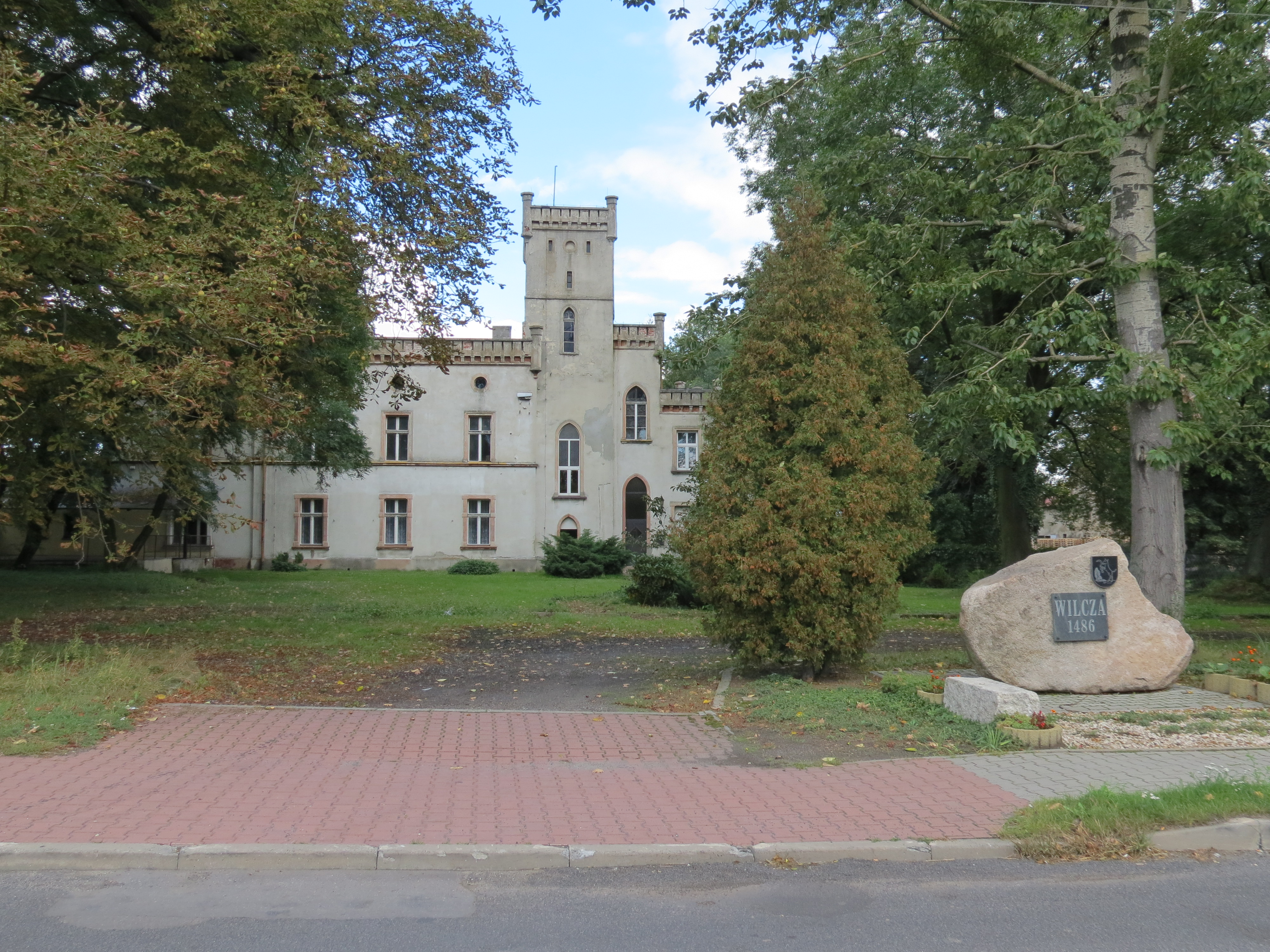
- Palace in Wilcza

- Location within Poland
- Coordinates: 50°11′18″N 18°35′48″E
- Country: Poland
- Voivodeship: Silesian
- County: Gliwice
- Gmina: Pilchowice

Population
  - Total: 2,063

Wilcza [ˈvilt͡ʂa] is a village in the administrative district of Gmina Pilchowice, within Gliwice County, Silesian Voivodeship, in southern Poland.
