= Pniów, Silesian Voivodeship =

Pniów
- Village
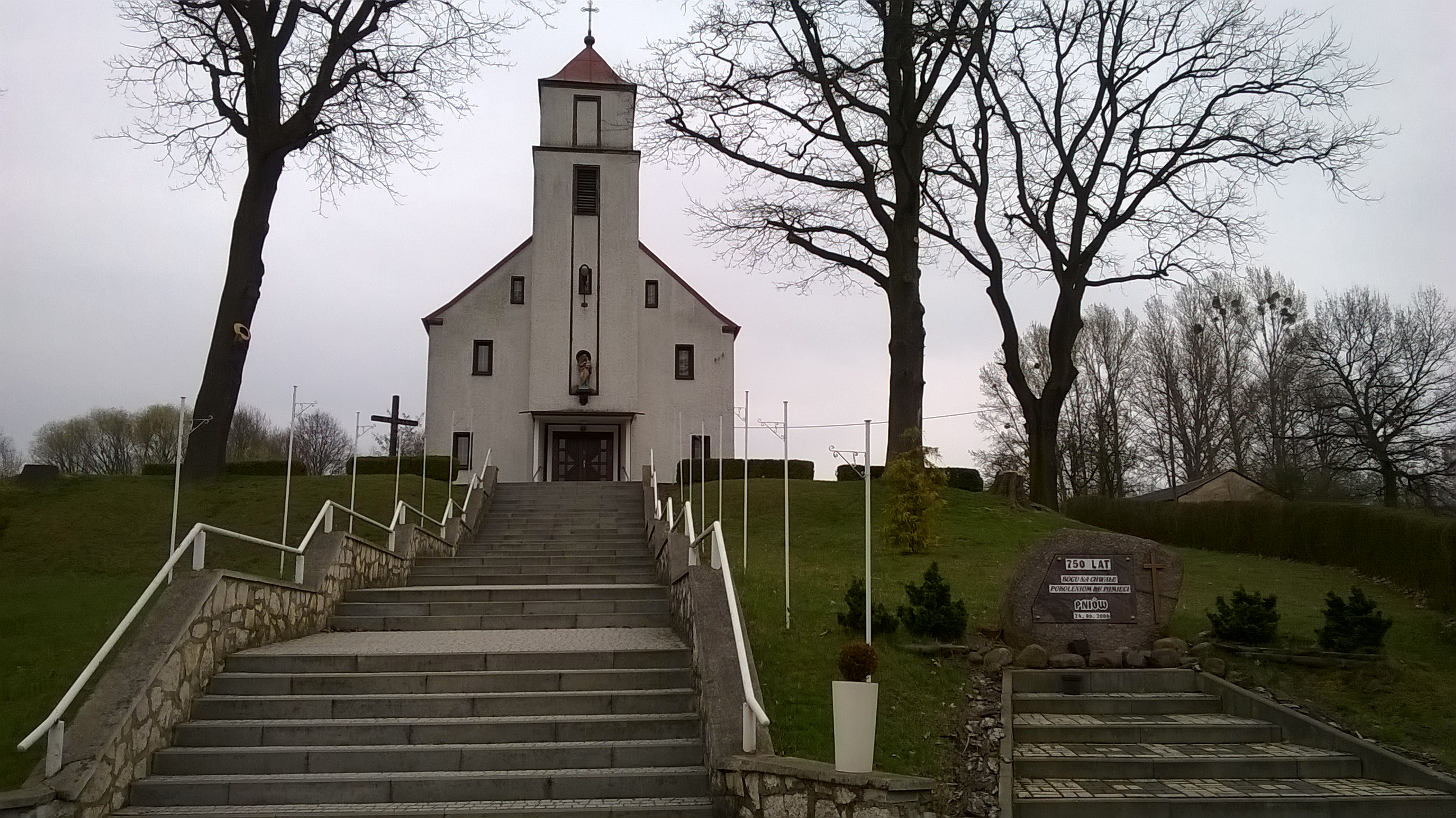
- Saint Wenceslaus church in Pniów

- Location within Poland
- Coordinates: 50°25′N 18°36′E
- Country: Poland
- Voivodeship: Silesian
- County: Gliwice
- Gmina: Toszek
- Population: 644
- Time zone: UTC+1 (CET)
  - Summer (DST): UTC+2 (CEST)
- Vehicle registration: SGL

Pniów [pɲuf] is a village in the administrative district of Gmina Toszek, within Gliwice County, Silesian Voivodeship, in southern Poland.

In the Liber fundationis episcopatus Vratislaviensis from around 1295–1305 the village was mentioned under the Latinized name Pnow. It was the location of a motte-and-bailey castle from the 13th-14th century, which is now an archaeological site.

== Transport ==
The Voivodeship road 901 runs through Pniów, and the National road 94 runs nearby, southwest of the village.
