= Leboszowice =

- Village
- Location within Poland
- Coordinates: 50°13′N 18°33′E
- Country: Poland
- Voivodeship: Silesian
- County: Gliwice
- Gmina: Pilchowice

Population
  - Total: 383

Leboszowice [lɛbɔʂɔˈvit͡sɛ] is a village in the administrative district of Gmina Pilchowice, within Gliwice County, Silesian Voivodeship, in southern Poland.
