= Nakło, Gliwice County =

Nakło
- Village
- Location within Poland
- Coordinates: 50°27′47″N 18°23′9″E
- Country: Poland
- Voivodeship: Silesian
- County: Gliwice
- Gmina: Toszek

Nakło [ˈnakwɔ] is a village in the administrative district of Gmina Toszek, within Gliwice County, Silesian Voivodeship, in southern Poland.
