= Pawłowice, Gliwice County =

Pawłowice
- Village
- Location within Poland
- Coordinates: 50°27′N 18°29′E
- Country: Poland
- Voivodeship: Silesian
- County: Gliwice
- Gmina: Toszek
- Population: 96

Pawłowice [pavwɔˈvit͡sɛ] is a village in the administrative district of Gmina Toszek, within Gliwice County, Silesian Voivodeship, in southern Poland.
