= Gogol, Poland =

Gogol
- Village
- Location within Poland
- Coordinates: 50°27′N 18°36′E
- Country: Poland
- Voivodeship: Silesian
- County: Gliwice
- Gmina: Wielowieś

Gogol [ˈɡɔɡɔl] is a village in the administrative district of Gmina Wielowieś, within Gliwice County, Silesian Voivodeship, in the south of Poland.
