= Grabina, Silesian Voivodeship =

Grabina
- Village
- Location within Poland
- Coordinates: 50°28′0″N 18°29′59″E
- Country: Poland
- Voivodeship: Silesian
- County: Gliwice
- Gmina: Toszek

Grabina [ɡraˈbina] is a village in the administrative district of Gmina Toszek, within Gliwice County, Silesian Voivodeship, in southern Poland.
