= Kuźnia Nieborowska =

- Village
- Location within Poland
- Coordinates: 50°12′N 18°36′E
- Country: Poland
- Voivodeship: Silesian
- County: Gliwice
- Gmina: Pilchowice
- Population: 389

Kuźnia Nieborowska [ˈkuʑɲa ɲɛbɔˈrɔfska] is a village in the administrative district of Gmina Pilchowice, within Gliwice County, Silesian Voivodeship, in southern Poland.
