= Las, Gliwice County =

Las
- Village
- Location within Poland
- Coordinates: 50°27′18″N 18°34′37″E
- Country: Poland
- Voivodeship: Silesian
- County: Gliwice
- Gmina: Toszek

Las [las] is a village in the administrative district of Gmina Toszek, within Gliwice County, Silesian Voivodeship, in southern Poland.

The name Las means "forest" in Polish.
