= Diana, Silesian Voivodeship =

Diana
- Village
- Location within Poland
- Coordinates: 50°32′N 18°31′E
- Country: Poland
- Voivodeship: Silesian
- County: Gliwice
- Gmina: Wielowieś

Diana [ˈdjana] is a village in the administrative district of Gmina Wielowieś, within Gliwice County, Silesian Voivodeship, in southern Poland.
