= Świbie =

- Village
- Aerial view in 2026

- Location within Poland
- Coordinates: 50°30′N 18°32′E
- Country: Poland
- Voivodeship: Silesian
- County: Gliwice
- Gmina: Wielowieś
- Population: 1,198

Świbie [ˈɕfibjɛ] is a village in the administrative district of Gmina Wielowieś, within Gliwice County, Silesian Voivodeship, in southern Poland.

== See also ==
- Peter Kiołbassa (1837-1905) Polonia activist and Democratic politician in the City of Chicago who helped organize Chicago's first Roman Catholic parish was born in Świbie
