= Grabów, Silesian Voivodeship =

Grabów
- Village
- Location within Poland
- Coordinates: 50°26′19″N 18°31′58″E
- Country: Poland
- Voivodeship: Silesian
- County: Gliwice
- Gmina: Toszek
- Time zone: UTC+1 (CET)
  - Summer (DST): UTC+2 (CEST)
- Vehicle registration: SGL

Grabów [ˈɡrabuf] is a village in the administrative district of Gmina Toszek, within Gliwice County, Silesian Voivodeship, in southern Poland.
