= Kopanina, Silesian Voivodeship =

Kopanina
- Village
- Location within Poland
- Coordinates: 50°27′19″N 18°26′36″E
- Country: Poland
- Voivodeship: Silesian
- County: Gliwice
- Gmina: Toszek

Kopanina [kɔpaˈnina] is a village in the administrative district of Gmina Toszek, within Gliwice County, Silesian Voivodeship, in southern Poland.
