= Goj, Silesian Voivodeship =

Goj
- Village
- Location within Poland
- Coordinates: 50°29′05″N 18°32′29″E
- Country: Poland
- Voivodeship: Silesian
- County: Gliwice
- Gmina: Wielowieś

Goj [ɡɔi̯] is a village in the administrative district of Gmina Wielowieś, within Gliwice County, Silesian Voivodeship, in southern Poland.
