= Pisarzowice =

Pisarzowice may refer to:

- Pisarzowice, Greater Poland Voivodeship (west-central Poland)
- Pisarzowice, Kamienna Góra County in Lower Silesian Voivodeship (south-west Poland)
- Pisarzowice, Lubań County in Lower Silesian Voivodeship (south-west Poland)
- Pisarzowice, Gmina Miękinia in Środa County, Lower Silesian Voivodeship (south-west Poland)
- Pisarzowice, Brzeg County in Opole Voivodeship (south-west Poland)
- Pisarzowice, Krapkowice County in Opole Voivodeship (south-west Poland)
- Pisarzowice, Bielsko County in Silesian Voivodeship (south Poland)
- Pisarzowice, Gliwice County in Silesian Voivodeship (south Poland)
