= Gajowice, Silesian Voivodeship =

Gajowice
- Village
- Location within Poland
- Coordinates: 50°29′N 18°34′E
- Country: Poland
- Voivodeship: Silesian
- County: Gliwice
- Gmina: Wielowieś
- Elevation: 195 m (640 ft)
- Population: 87

Gajowice [ɡajɔˈvit͡sɛ] is a village in the administrative district of Gmina Wielowieś, within Gliwice County, Silesian Voivodeship, in southern Poland.
