= Ciochowice =

- Village
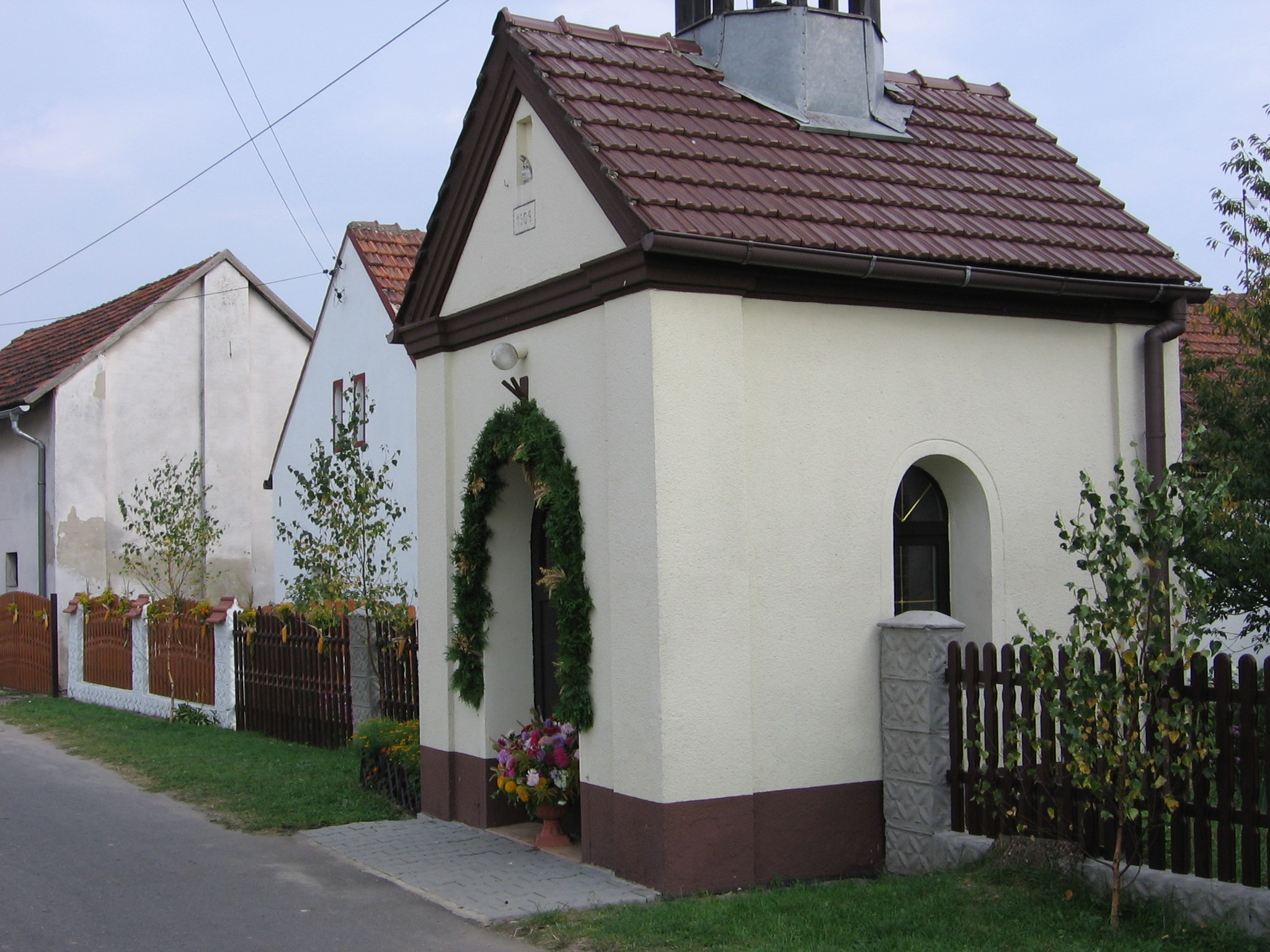
- Chapel

- Location within Poland
- Coordinates: 50°25′N 18°31′E
- Country: Poland
- Voivodeship: Silesian
- County: Gliwice
- Gmina: Toszek
- Elevation: 223 m (732 ft)
- Population: 390

Ciochowice [t͡ɕɔxɔˈvit͡sɛ] is a village in the administrative district of Gmina Toszek, within Gliwice County, Silesian Voivodeship, in southern Poland.
