= Chwoszcz =

- Village
- Location within Poland
- Coordinates: 50°27′42″N 18°37′29″E
- Country: Poland
- Voivodeship: Silesian
- County: Gliwice
- Gmina: Wielowieś

Chwoszcz [xfɔʂt͡ʂ] is a village in the administrative district of Gmina Wielowieś, within Gliwice County, Silesian Voivodeship, in southern Poland.
