= Radonia, Silesian Voivodeship =

Radonia
- Village
- Location within Poland
- Coordinates: 50°31′N 18°34′E
- Country: Poland
- Voivodeship: Silesian
- County: Gliwice
- Gmina: Wielowieś
- Population: 425

Radonia [raˈdɔɲa] is a village in the administrative district of Gmina Wielowieś, within Gliwice County, Silesian Voivodeship, in southern Poland.
