= Wiśnicze =

- Village
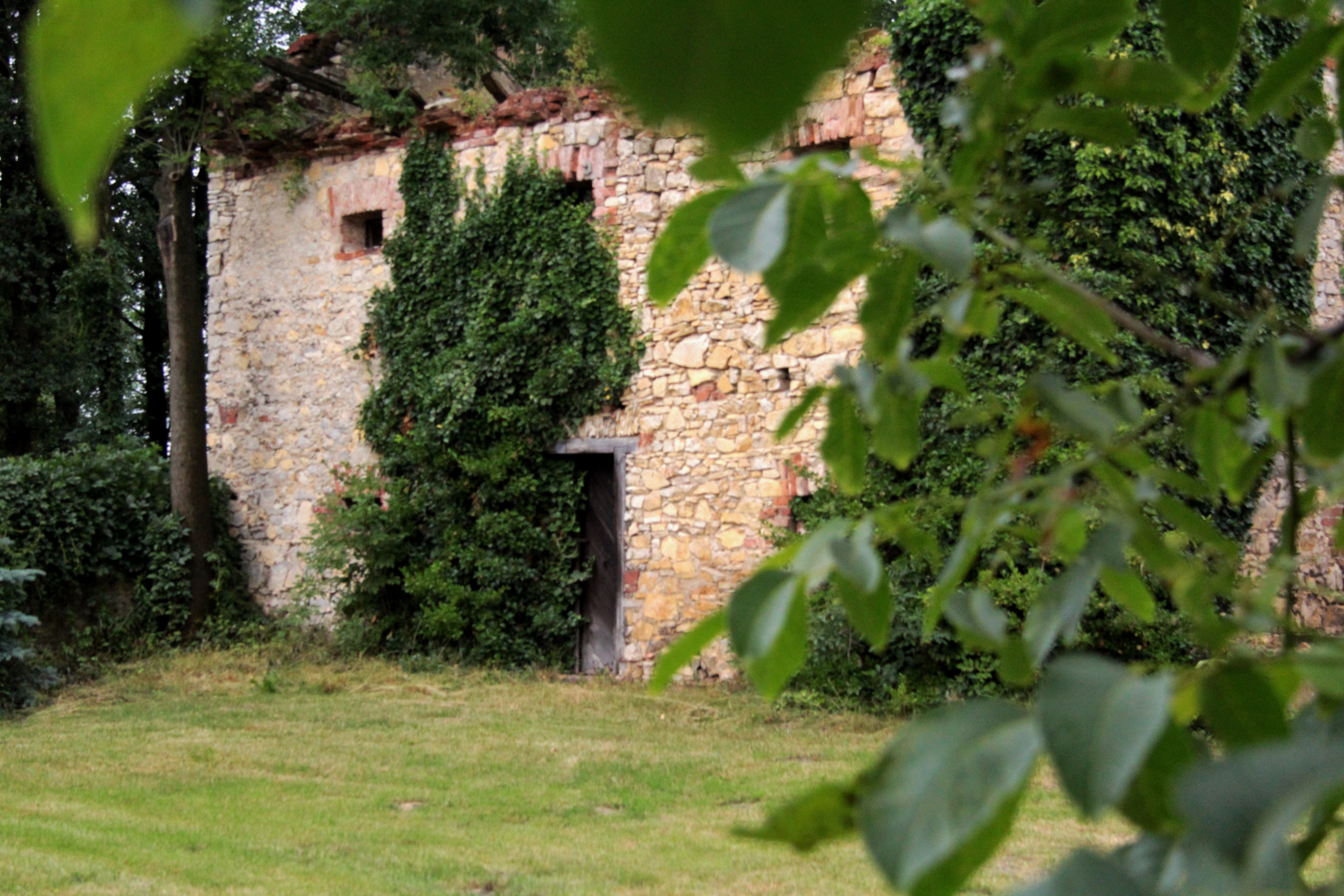
- Old granary in Wiśnicze

- Location within Poland
- Coordinates: 50°29′N 18°33′E
- Country: Poland
- Voivodeship: Silesian
- County: Gliwice
- Gmina: Wielowieś
- Population: 311
- Time zone: UTC+1 (CET)
  - Summer (DST): UTC+2 (CEST)
- Vehicle registration: SGL

Wiśnicze [viɕˈnit͡ʂɛ] is a village in the administrative district of Gmina Wielowieś, within Gliwice County, Silesian Voivodeship, in southern Poland.

The name of the village is of Polish origin and comes from the word wiśnia, which means "cherry".
