= Szklarnia =

Szklarnia may refer to the following places in Poland:

- Szklarnia, Lower Silesian Voivodeship (south-west Poland)
- Szklarnia, Janów County in Lublin Voivodeship (east Poland)
- Szklarnia, Lublin County in Lublin Voivodeship (east Poland)
- Szklarnia, Greater Poland Voivodeship (west-central Poland)
- Szklarnia, Gliwice County in Silesian Voivodeship (south Poland)
- Szklarnia, Lubliniec County in Silesian Voivodeship (south Poland)
- Szklarnia, Mrągowo County in Warmian-Masurian Voivodeship (north Poland)
- Szklarnia, Ostróda County in Warmian-Masurian Voivodeship (north Poland)
- Szklarnia, Szczytno County in Warmian-Masurian Voivodeship (north Poland)
