= Srocza Góra =

- Village
- Location within Poland
- Coordinates: 50°25′14″N 18°37′33″E
- Country: Poland
- Voivodeship: Silesian
- County: Gliwice
- Gmina: Toszek

Srocza Góra [ˈsrɔt͡ʂa ˈɡura] is a village in the administrative district of Gmina Toszek, within Gliwice County, Silesian Voivodeship, in southern Poland.
