= Boguszyce, Silesian Voivodeship =

Boguszyce
- Village
- Location within Poland
- Coordinates: 50°26′N 18°30′E
- Country: Poland
- Voivodeship: Silesian
- County: Gliwice
- Gmina: Toszek
- Population: 277

Boguszyce [bɔɡuˈʂɨt͡sɛ] is a village in the administrative district of Gmina Toszek, within Gliwice County, Silesian Voivodeship, in southern Poland.
