= Dąbrówka, Gliwice County =

Dąbrówka
- Village
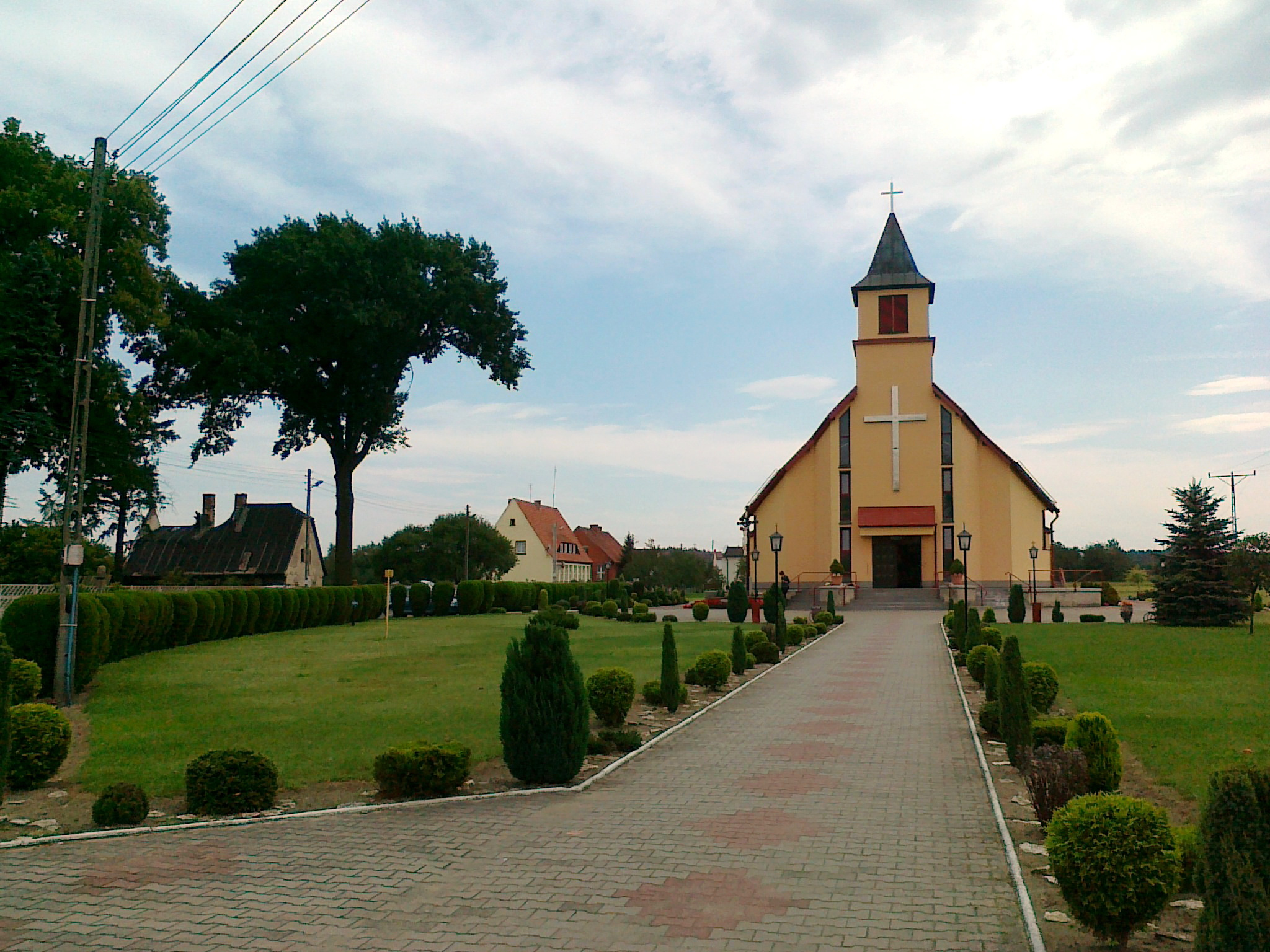

- Location within Poland
- Coordinates: 50°30′N 18°28′E
- Country: Poland
- Voivodeship: Silesian
- County: Gliwice
- Gmina: Wielowieś
- Population: 502

Dąbrówka [dɔmˈbrufka] is a village in the administrative district of Gmina Wielowieś, within Gliwice County, Silesian Voivodeship, in southern Poland.
