= Płużniczka =

- Village
- Location within Poland
- Coordinates: 50°28′22″N 18°29′11″E
- Country: Poland
- Voivodeship: Silesian
- County: Gliwice
- Gmina: Toszek
- Population: 279

Płużniczka [pwuʐˈnit͡ʂka] is a village in the administrative district of Gmina Toszek, within Gliwice County, Silesian Voivodeship, in southern Poland.
