= Gmina Wielowieś =

Gmina Wielowieś Wielowieś Commune
- Gmina
- Coat of arms
- Interactive map of Gmina Wielowieś
- Coordinates (Wielowieś): 50°30′32″N 18°36′56″E
- Country: Poland
- Voivodeship: Silesian
- County: Gliwice
- Seat: Wielowieś

Area
  - Total: 116.59 km^{2} (45.02 sq mi)

Population (2019-06-30)
  - Total: 5,852
  - Density: 50.19/km^{2} (130.0/sq mi)
- Website: http://www.wielowies.pl/

Gmina Wielowieś is a rural gmina (administrative district) in Gliwice County, Silesian Voivodeship, in southern Poland. Its seat is the village of Wielowieś, which lies approximately 26 kilometres (16 mi) north of Gliwice and 40 km (25 mi) north-west of the regional capital Katowice.

The gmina covers an area of 116.59 square kilometres (45.0 sq mi), and as of 2019, its total population was 5,852.

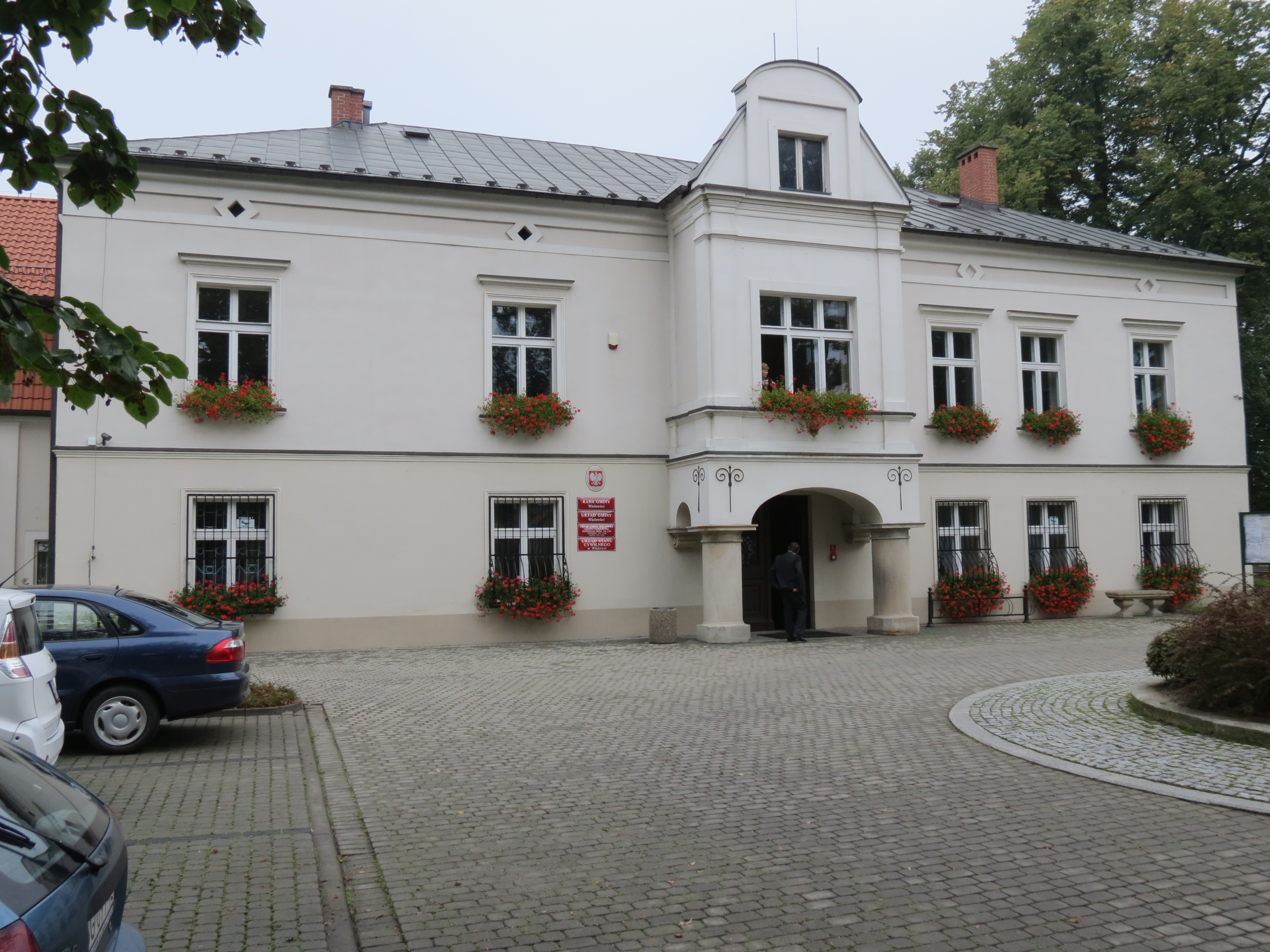

== Villages ==
Gmina Wielowieś contains the villages and settlements of Błażejowice, Borowiany, Chwoszcz, Czarków, Dąbrówka, Diana, Gajowice, Gogol, Goj, Jerzmanów, Kieleczka, Kolonia, Kotków, Napłatki, Pustkowie, Radonia, Sieroty, Świbie, Ubowice, Wielowieś, Wiśnicze and Zacharzowice.

== Neighbouring gminas ==
Gmina Wielowieś is bordered by the town of Pyskowice and by the gminas of Jemielnica, Krupski Młyn, Strzelce Opolskie, Toszek, Tworóg, Zawadzkie and Zbrosławice.
