= Gmina Toszek =

Gmina Toszek Toszek Commune
- Gmina
- Coat of arms
- Interactive map of Gmina Toszek
- Coordinates (Toszek): 50°27′N 18°31′E
- Country: Poland
- Voivodeship: Silesian
- County: Gliwice
- Seat: Toszek

Area
  - Total: 98.53 km^{2} (38.04 sq mi)

Population
  - Total: 9,409
  - Density: 95.49/km^{2} (247.3/sq mi)
  - Urban: 3,600
  - Rural: 5,809
- Website: https://toszek.pl

Gmina Toszek is an urban-rural gmina (administrative district) in Gliwice County, Silesian Voivodeship, in southern Poland. Its seat is the town of Toszek, which lies approximately 22 kilometres (14 mi) north-west of Gliwice and 41 km (25 mi) north-west of the regional capital Katowice.

The gmina covers an area of 98.53 square kilometres (38.0 sq mi) and had a total population of 9,409 in 2019.

== Villages ==
Apart from the town of Toszek, Gmina Toszek contains the villages and settlements of Bliziec, Boguszyce, Brzezina, Ciochowice, Grabina, Grabów, Kopanina, Kotliszowice, Kotulin, Kotulin Mały, Łączki, Las, Laura, Ligota Toszecka, Nakło, Paczyna, Paczynka, Pawłowice, Pisarzowice, Płużniczka, Pniów, Proboszczowice, Sarnów, Skały, Srocza Góra, Szklarnia, Wilkowiczki, Wrzosy and Zalesie.

== Neighbouring gminas ==
Gmina Toszek is bordered by the town of Pyskowice and by the gminas of Bierawa, Rudziniec, Strzelce Opolskie, Ujazd, Wielowieś and Zbrosławice.
