= Gmina Pilchowice =

Gmina Pilchowice Pilchowice Commune
- Gmina
- Coat of arms
- Interactive map of Gmina Pilchowice
- Coordinates (Pilchowice): 50°12′55″N 18°33′40″E
- Country: Poland
- Voivodeship: Silesian
- County: Gliwice
- Seat: Pilchowice

Area
  - Total: 67.51 km^{2} (26.07 sq mi)

Population (2019-06-30)
  - Total: 11,945
  - Density: 176.9/km^{2} (458.3/sq mi)
- Website: https://pilchowice.pl/

Gmina Pilchowice is a rural gmina (administrative district) in Gliwice County, Silesian Voivodeship, in southern Poland. Its seat is the village of Pilchowice, which lies approximately 11 kilometres (7 mi) south-west of Gliwice and 32 km (20 mi) west of the regional capital Katowice.

The gmina covers an area of 67.51 square kilometres (26.1 sq mi), and as of 2019, its total population was 11,945.

The gmina contains part of the protected area called the Rudy Landscape Park.

== Villages ==
Gmina Pilchowice contains the villages and settlements of Kuźnia Nieborowska, Leboszowice, Nieborowice, Pilchowice, Stanica, Wilcza and Żernica.

== Neighbouring gminas ==
Gmina Pilchowice is bordered by the towns of Gliwice, Knurów and Rybnik, and by the gminas of Czerwionka-Leszczyny, Kuźnia Raciborska and Sośnicowice.

== Twin towns – sister cities ==
Gmina Pilchowice is twinned with:

- Bobritzsch-Hilbersdorf, Germany
