= Kotulin Mały =

- Village
- Location within Poland
- Coordinates: 50°27′36″N 18°24′31″E
- Country: Poland
- Voivodeship: Silesian
- County: Gliwice
- Gmina: Toszek

Kotulin Mały [kɔˈtulin ˈmawɨ] is a village in the administrative district of Gmina Toszek, within Gliwice County, Silesian Voivodeship, in southern Poland.
