= Defogger =

Motor vehicle window system

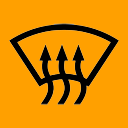
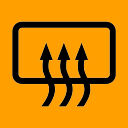
A front windshield defroster (left) and A rear window defroster (right) symbol.

A defogger, demister, or defroster is a system to clear condensation and thaw frost from the windshield, backglass, side windows, or side-view mirror of a motor vehicle. The rear window defroster was invented by German automobile engineer Heinz Kunert.

== Types ==
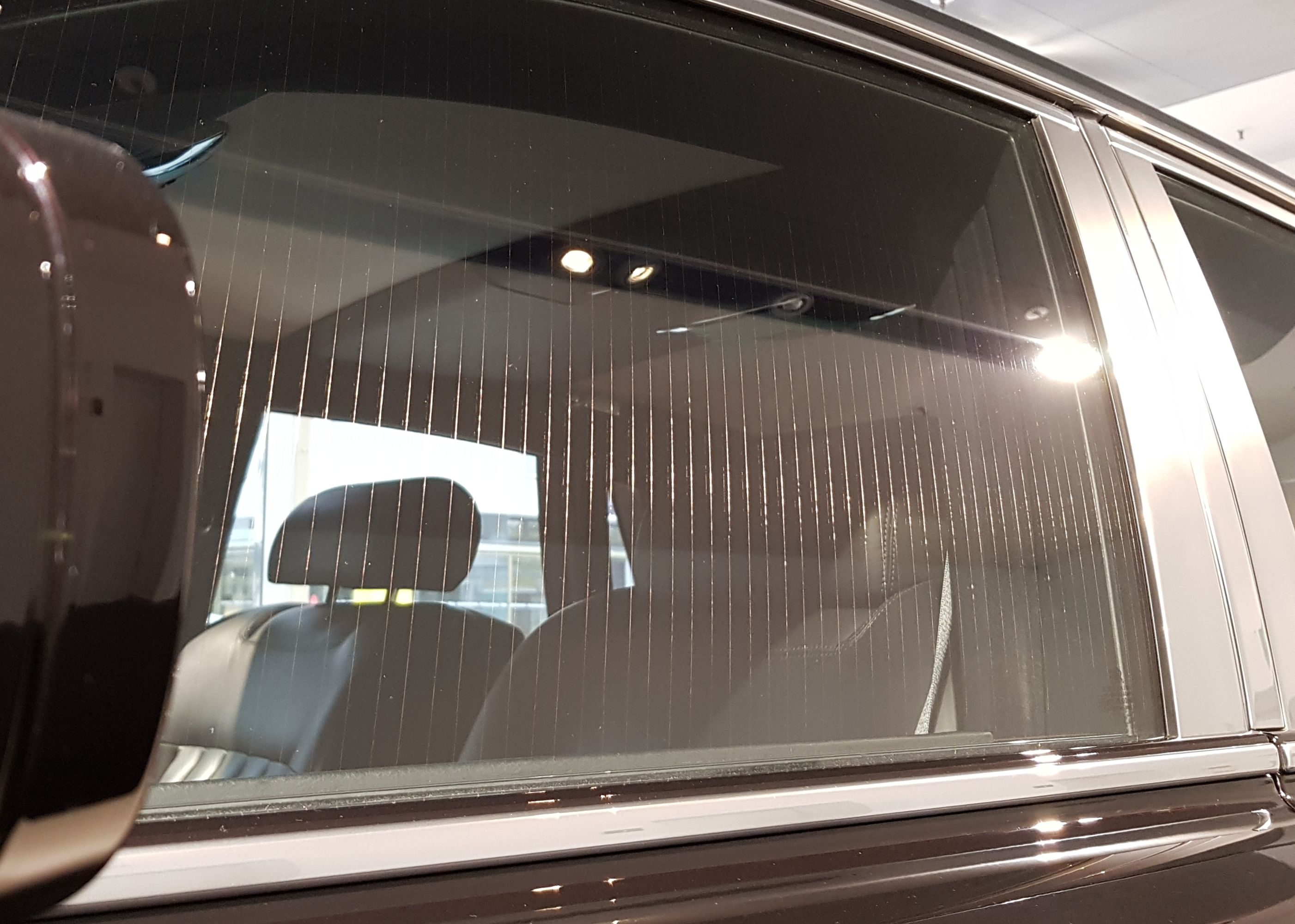
Side window defogger wires of Rolls-Royce Phantom (2003).

=== Primary defogger ===
For primary defogging, heat is generally provided by the vehicle's engine coolant via the heater core; fresh air is blown through the heater core and then ducted to and distributed over the interior surface of the windshield by a blower. This air is in many cases first cooled down and dehumidified by passing it through the vehicle's operating air conditioning evaporator. Such dehumidification, when followed by a reheating, makes the defogging more effective and faster, for the dry warm air has a greater capacity of absorbing water from the glass at which it is directed (with respect to the moist warm air provided by the heater alone, and the dry cold air provided by the air conditioning system alone). However, whenever the vehicle is equipped with an air conditioning system, care must be taken to keep it in an operational state for the primary defogger to operate optimally. Also, at very low ambient temperatures, the air conditioning system might not turn on, in order to prevent possible compressor damage. In modern vehicles, running this type of defogger often automatically switches the air conditioning system on, without further action required.

=== Secondary defogger ===
Secondary defoggers, such as those used on a vehicle's backglass and/or side view mirrors, often consist of a series of parallel linear resistive conductors in or on the glass. When power is applied, these conductors heat up, thawing ice and evaporating condensation from the glass. These conductors may be composed of a silver-ceramic material printed and baked onto the interior surface of the glass, or may be a series of very fine wires embedded within the glass. The surface-printed variety is prone to damage by abrasion, but can be repaired easily with a conductive paint material.

Various terms are applied to secondary defoggers, such as "electric window defogger" (EWD), "rear window defogger" (RWD), etc.

== Automation ==
Resistive-heat defoggers are usually equipped with an automatic timer to operate for a set time period of 10 to 15 minutes before switching off. This is because most defogging is achieved within that timeframe, after which the vehicle's heater has usually brought the interior of the vehicle to a warm enough temperature that the fog does not recur. However, if this is not the case, the driver may activate the system again once it has timed out. There is usually a telltale on the vehicle dashboard, often on the defogger switch, to let the driver know.

== See also ==
- Rear-view mirror
