= Kotulin, Silesian Voivodeship =

Kotulin
- Village
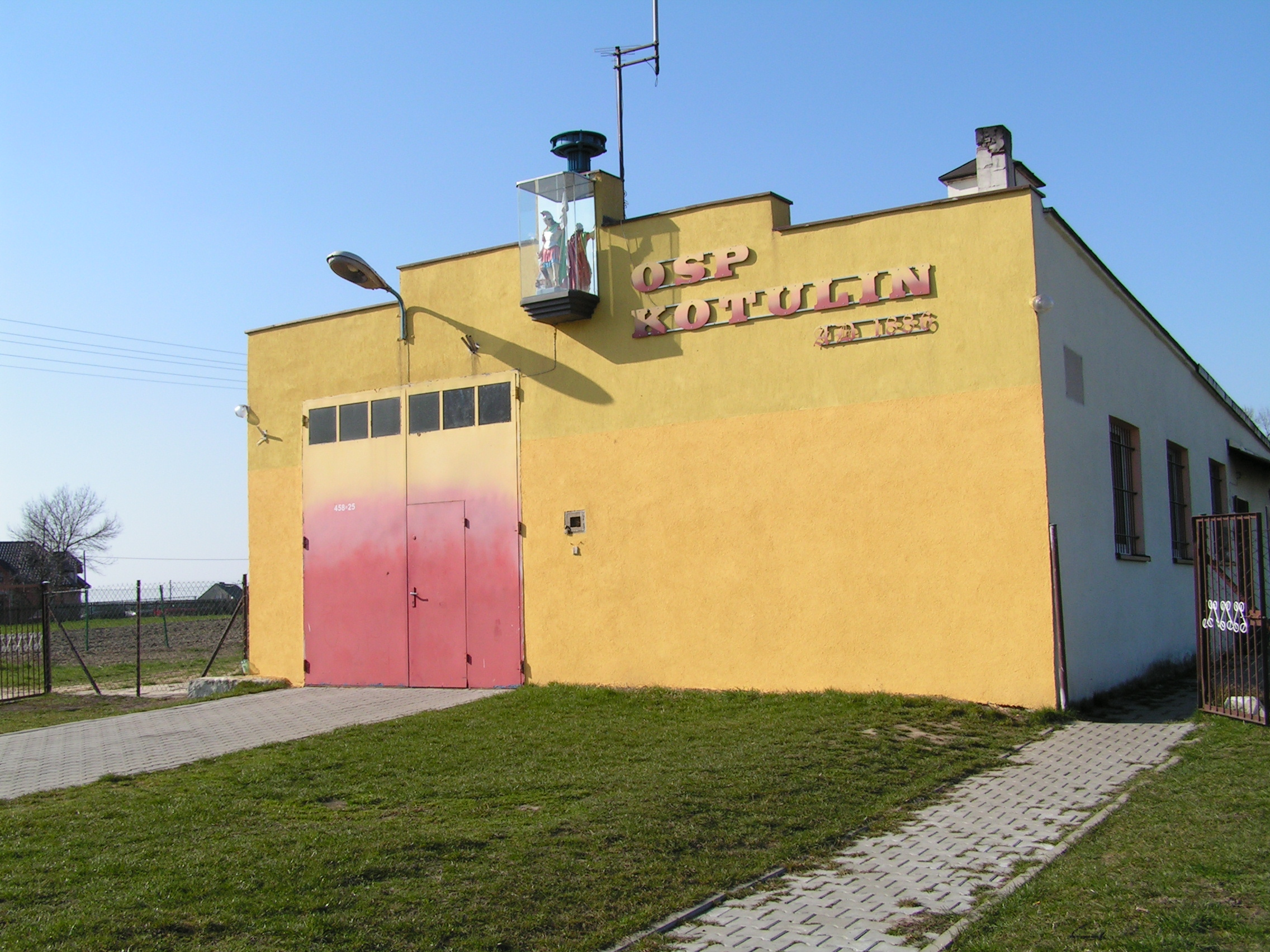
- Fire station

- Location within Poland
- Coordinates: 50°28′0″N 18°25′0″E
- Country: Poland
- Voivodeship: Silesian
- County: Gliwice
- Gmina: Toszek
- Elevation: 248 m (814 ft)
- Population: 1,282

Kotulin [kɔˈtulin] is a village in the administrative district of Gmina Toszek, within Gliwice County, Silesian Voivodeship, in southern Poland.
