= Pilchowice, Silesian Voivodeship =

Pilchowice
- Village
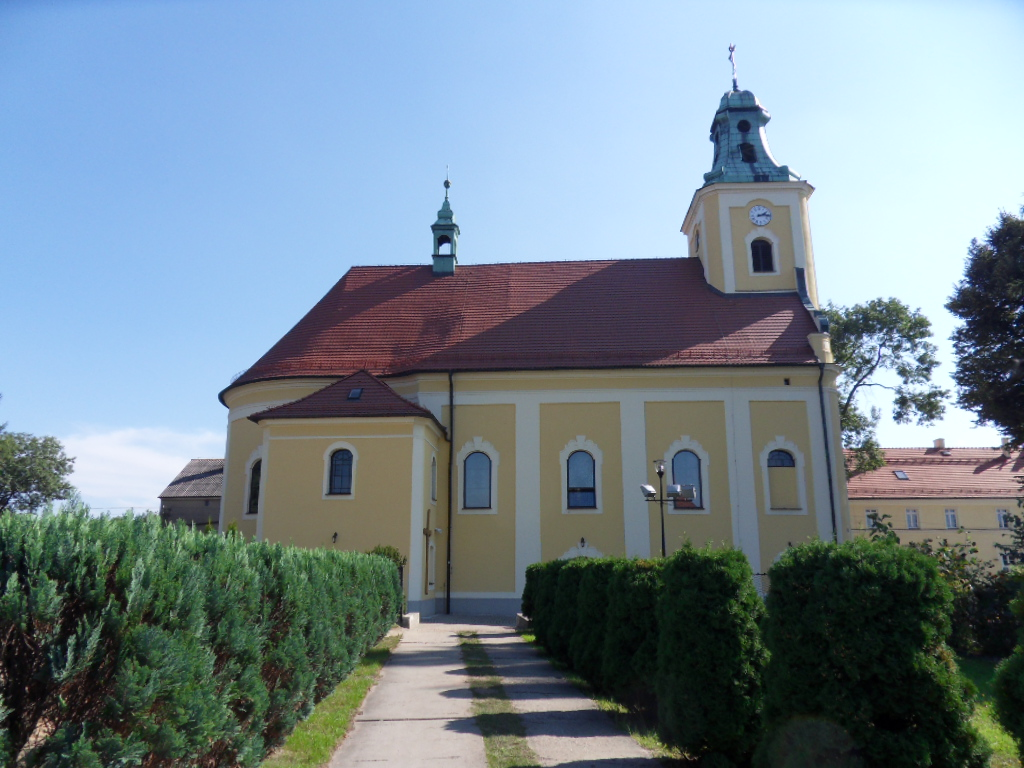
- Church of Saint John the Baptist

- Location within Poland
- Coordinates: 50°12′55″N 18°33′40″E
- Country: Poland
- Voivodeship: Silesian
- County: Gliwice
- Gmina: Pilchowice

Population
  - Total: 2,919

Pilchowice [pilxɔˈvit͡sɛ] is a village in Gliwice County, Silesian Voivodeship, in southern Poland. It is the seat of the gmina (administrative district) called Gmina Pilchowice.
