= Sarnów, Gliwice County =

Sarnów
- Village
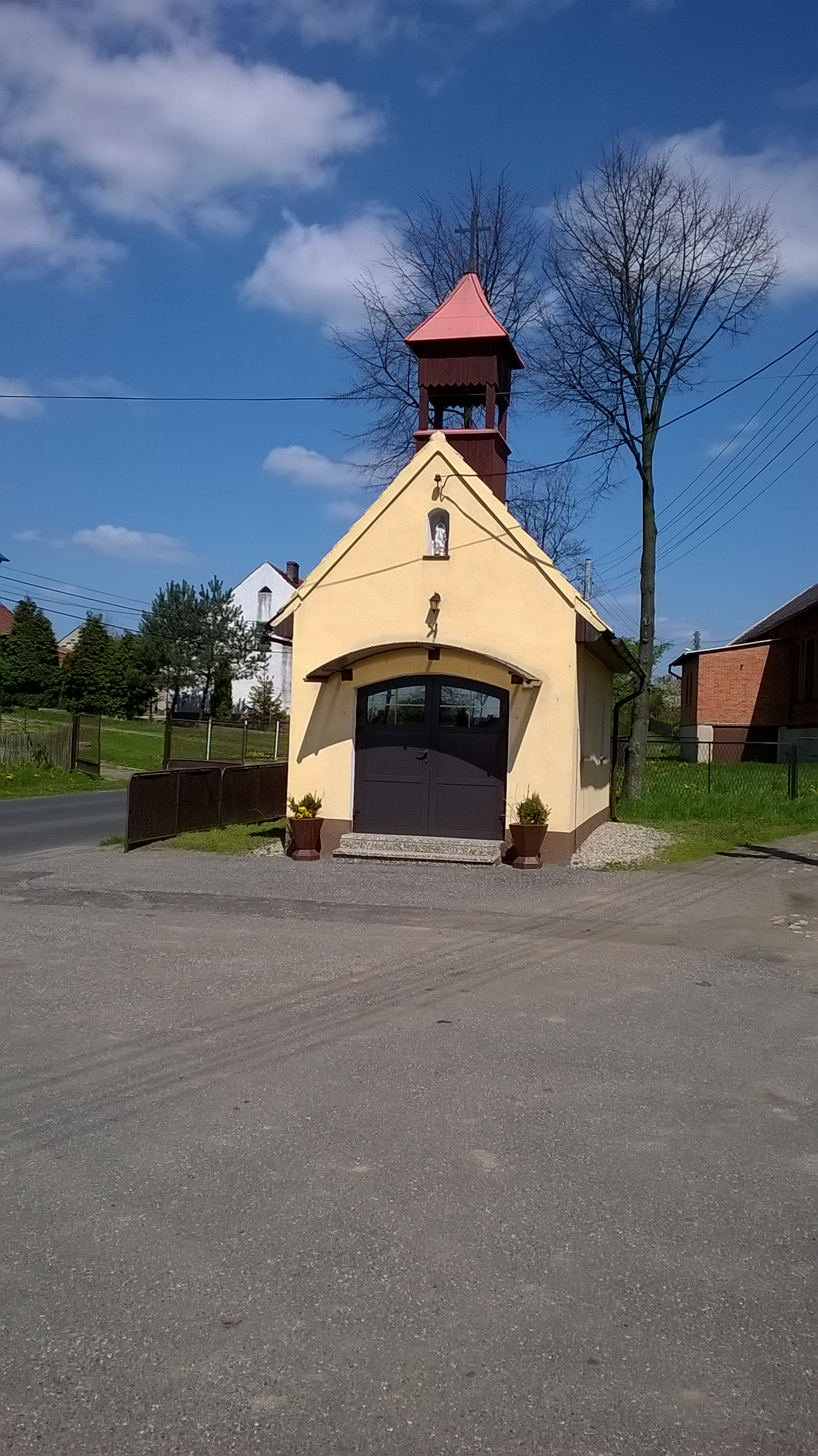
- Chapel

- Location within Poland
- Coordinates: 50°28′N 18°30′E
- Country: Poland
- Voivodeship: Silesian
- County: Gliwice
- Gmina: Toszek
- Population: 408

Sarnów [ˈsarnuf] is a village in the administrative district of Gmina Toszek, within Gliwice County, Silesian Voivodeship, in southern Poland.
