= Peter Kiołbassa =

Polonia activist and Democratic politician in the city of Chicago

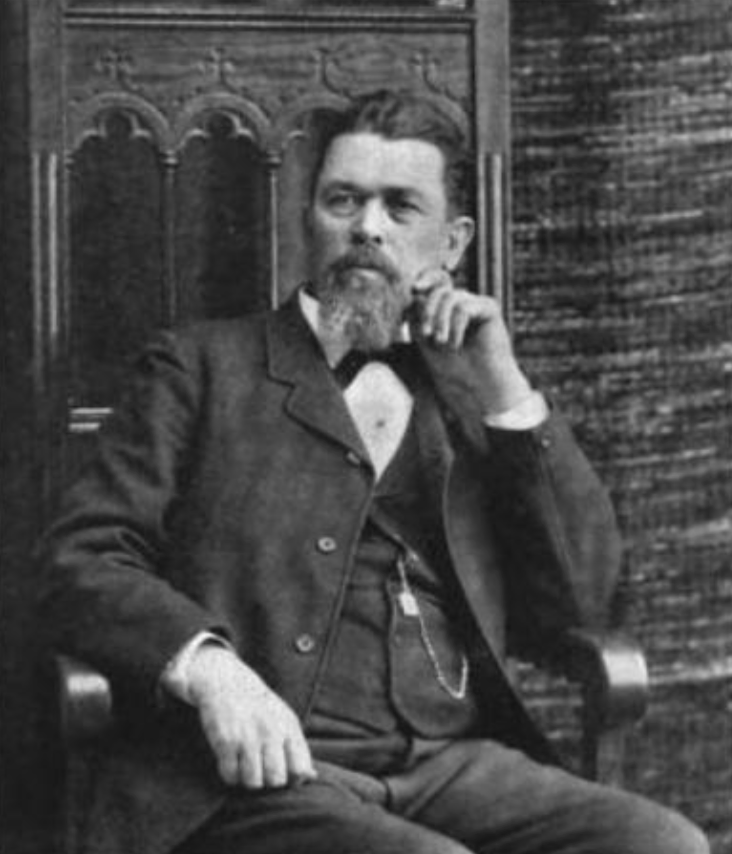
- Treasurer of the City of Chicago

City Treasurer of Chicago
- In office 1891–1893
- Preceded by: Bernard Roesing
- Succeeded by: Michael J. Bransfield

Chicago Alderman from the 16th Ward
- In office 1896–1898

Personal details
- Born: 1837 Świbie, Province of Silesia, Kingdom of Prussia
- Died: June 23, 1905 (aged 67–68) Chicago, Illinois
- Party: Democratic

Peter Kiołbassa (1837 – June 23, 1905) was a Polonia activist and a Democratic politician in the city of Chicago, serving as Chicago Treasurer and Commissioner of Public Works. Nicknamed "Honest Pete" because he refused to take city funds from financial decisions made as Treasurer, he broke from the tradition of his predecessors. He was the first Pole to be elected to such positions in the city. He was a major organizer of St. Stanislaus Kostka Church, and worked as president of the Polish Roman Catholic Union of America, in order to regain the Poles' loyalty to the Roman Catholic Church.

== Early life and Civil War ==
Kiołbassa came from the Silesian village of Świbie with his family when he was 17 years old, arriving in the town of Panna Maria, Texas, which was a new Polish immigrant settlement. He spoke Polish and German fluently from his youth, he did not speak any English until he arrived in the United States, when, upon his arrival, he learned English and Spanish. In 1862, he joined the Confederate Army, and was captured in 1863. After his capture, the Union Army recruited him to their side, making him a sergeant; he was promoted to sergeant major and then captain during the Civil War. After the Civil War, he moved to Chicago and served on the police force. Because of his polyglot abilities and excellent handwriting, he advanced to sergeant and then secretary to the Chief of Police. Initially, he was a member of the Republican Party. His support for Ulysses S. Grant during the 1872 election was documented in an editorial he wrote to Sobota, where he urged Poles to vote for Grant. After this election, he switched his affiliation to the Democratic Party, organizing support among Polish Americans. In 1888, he ran as a Democrat for alderman of Chicago's 16th Ward, which contained a highly Polish constituency, against Republican August Kowalski, another Pole. Their competition split the Polish vote, and he lost the election to Kowalski.

== Roman Catholic Union ==
Kiołbassa was elected president of the Polish Roman Catholic Union in 1888, and used much of his political expertise to advance the Polish Catholic community. Kiołbassa helped organize the Roman Catholic Parish of St. Stanislaus Kostka in Chicago, which later became the largest Polish parish in the U.S. Reportedly, organizing the church alongside his police duties had been so difficult, he took a year off, in 1871–72, and moved back to Panna Maria, Texas.

Kiołbassa's presidency oversaw growing divisions between Polish American Catholics and the Church. Victor Greene, in For God and Country: The Rise of Polish and Lithuanian Consciousness in America, posits that Kiołbassa was solidly in the "religionist" camp of Polish immigrants; whereas many felt oppressed, and rebelled against what they saw as Anglo-German-Irish domination of the Catholic Church in America, he was a solid supporter of the Roman Catholic Church, and saw no reason to schism from church leadership. His work expanding and developing the St. Stanislaus Kostka church served to placate many of the Poles who wanted to break away.

== Treasurer and later life ==
Kiołbassa served in the Customs Department, and in 1891, he ran for Chicago Treasurer, as a part of a slate of Democratic candidates, making him the first Pole in that position. Banks were not cooperative with him, refusing to lend him a necessary $15 million bond without proper backing. He found backing from his political allies and the Polish American community. When offered the choice on what to do with the interest, he broke tradition from his predecessors, who would keep the interest from successful financial decisions for themselves. Kiołbassa earned the nickname "Honest Pete" because he chose to turn the $44,000 in interest back to the city, fulfilling his campaign promise.

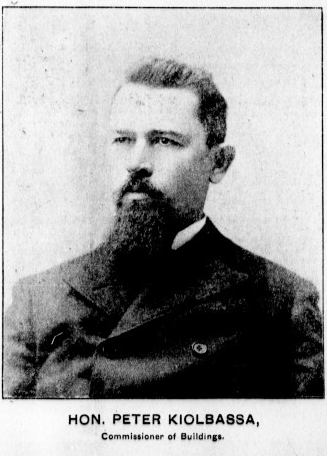
Kiolbassa featured in the Chicago Eagle, 1901

Kiołbassa was urged to run for governor of Illinois after his term as Treasurer. He did not believe the state would vote for a foreign-born governor, despite the successful election of German-born John Peter Altgeld. He became alderman in 1896, narrowly defeating John F. Smulski. In his later life, he became commissioner of public works and buildings commissioner, where he became entangled in controversies regarding poor construction across the city. His public image tarnished, Carter Harrison IV (the mayor of Chicago) defended Kiołbassa, saying he had been "scandalously wronged" by problems that occurred under his predecessors' watch. Kiołbassa tendered his resignation, never to return to elected office.
