= Szklarnia, Gliwice County =

Szklarnia
- Village
- Location within Poland
- Coordinates: 50°26′N 18°26′E
- Country: Poland
- Voivodeship: Silesian
- County: Gliwice
- Gmina: Toszek

Szklarnia [ˈʂklarɲa] is a village in the administrative district of Gmina Toszek, within Gliwice County, Silesian Voivodeship, in southern Poland.
