= Wielowieś, Silesian Voivodeship =

Wielowieś
- Village
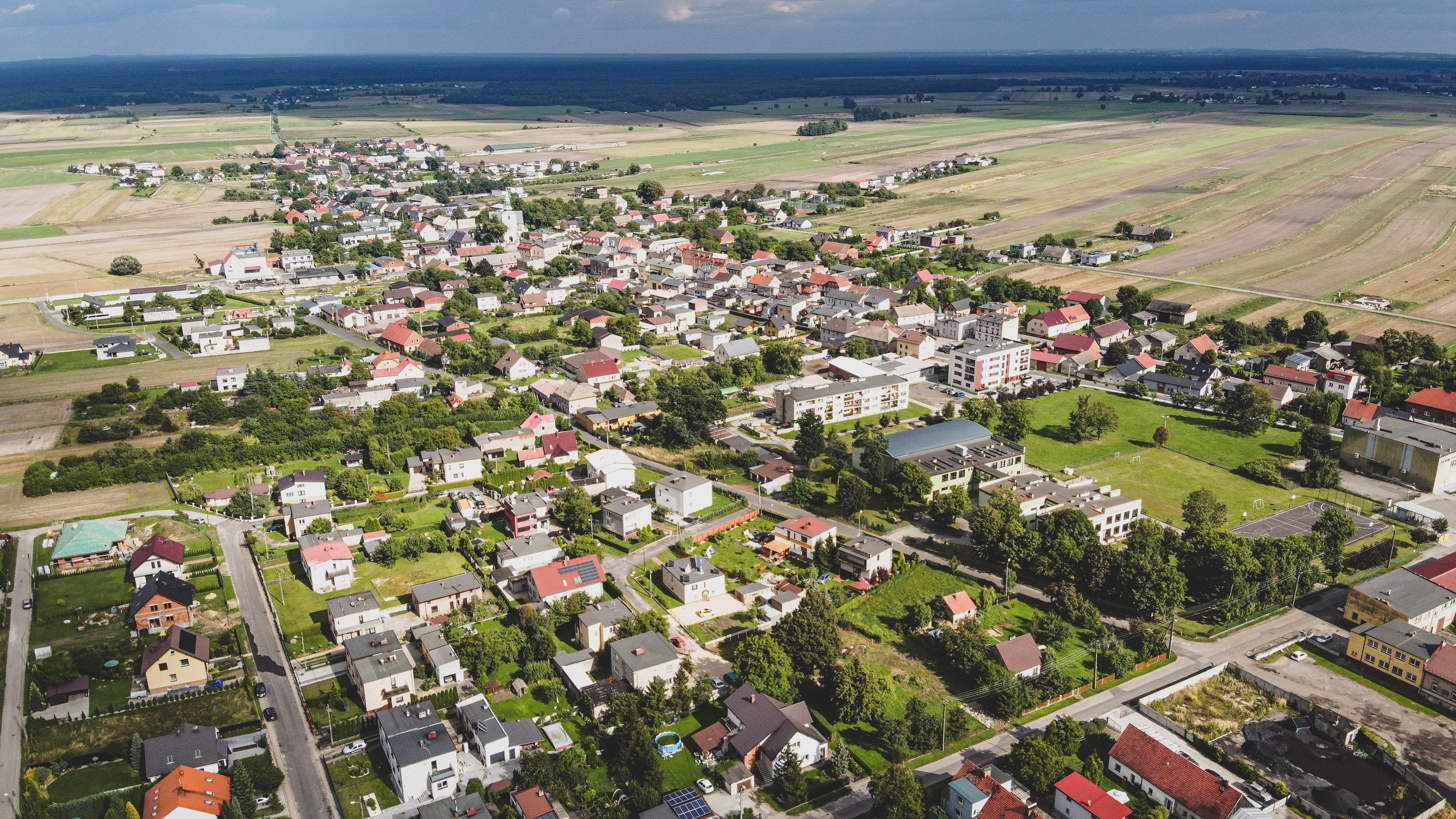
- Wielowieś, aerial view

- Coat of arms

- Location within Poland
- Coordinates: 50°30′32″N 18°36′26″E
- Country: Poland
- Voivodeship: Silesian
- County: Gliwice
- Gmina: Wielowieś

Government
- Elevation: 264 m (866 ft)
- Population: 1,924
- Time zone: UTC+1 (CET)
  - Summer (DST): UTC+2 (CEST)
- Postal code: 44-187
- Car plates: SGL

Wielowieś [ˈvjɛlɔvjɛɕ] is a village in the administrative district of Gmina Wielowieś, within Gliwice County, Silesian Voivodeship, in south Poland.
