= Gliwice County =

Gliwice County Powiat gliwicki
- County
- Flag Coat of arms

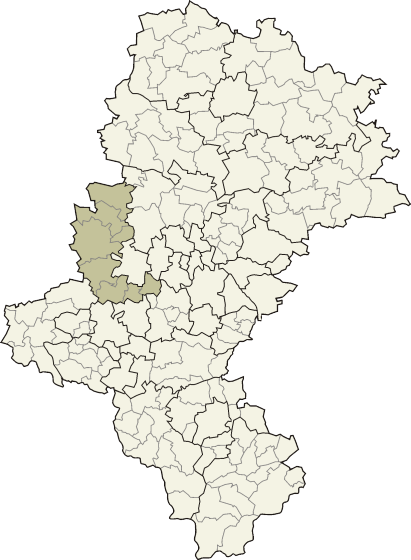
- Location within Silesian Voivodeship
- Coordinates (Gliwice): 50°17′N 18°40′E
- Country: Poland
- Voivodeship: Silesian
- Seat: Gliwice
- Gminas: Total 8 (incl. 2 urban): Knurów; Pyskowice; Gmina Gierałtowice; Gmina Pilchowice; Gmina Rudziniec; Gmina Sośnicowice; Gmina Toszek; Gmina Wielowieś

Area
  - Total: 663.35 km^{2} (256.12 sq mi)

Population (2019-06-30)
  - Total: 115,571
  - Density: 174.22/km^{2} (451.24/sq mi)
  - Urban: 62,261
  - Rural: 53,310
- Car plates: SGL
- Website: www.powiatgliwicki.pl

Gliwice County (Polish: powiat gliwicki) is a unit of territorial administration and local government (powiat) in Silesian Voivodeship, southern Poland. It came into being on January 1, 1999, as a result of the Polish local government reforms passed in 1998. Its administrative seat is the city of Gliwice, although the city is not part of the county (it constitutes a separate city county). The county contains four towns: Knurów, 8 km (5 mi) south of Gliwice, Pyskowice, 12 km (7 mi) north of Gliwice, Toszek, 22 km (14 mi) north-west of Gliwice, and Sośnicowice, 10 km (6 mi) west of Gliwice.

The county covers an area of 663.35 square kilometres (256.1 sq mi). As of 2019 its total population is 115,571. The most populated towns are Knurów with 38,310 inhabitants and Pyskowice with 18,432 inhabitants.

== Neighbouring counties ==
Apart from the city of Gliwice, Gliwice County is also bordered by Tarnowskie Góry County to the north-east, the city of Zabrze to the east, Mikołów County and the city of Ruda Śląska to the south-east, Rybnik County and the city of Rybnik to the south, Racibórz County to the south-west, Kędzierzyn-Koźle County to the west, and Strzelce County to the north-west.

== Administrative divisions ==
The county is subdivided into eight gminas (two urban, two urban-rural and four rural). These are listed in the following table, in descending order of population.

Gmina	Type	Area (km^{2})	Population (2019)	Seat
Knurów	urban	34.0	38,310	
Pyskowice	urban	31.1	18,432	
Gmina Gierałtowice	rural	39.0	12,096	Gierałtowice
Gmina Pilchowice	rural	67.5	11,945	Pilchowice
Gmina Rudziniec	rural	160.4	10,633	Rudziniec
Gmina Toszek	urban-rural	98.5	9,409	Toszek
Gmina Sośnicowice	urban-rural	116.2	8,894	Sośnicowice
Gmina Wielowieś	rural	116.6	5,852	Wielowieś
