= Gajówka =

Gajówka may refer to the following places in Poland:

- Gajówka, Lower Silesian Voivodeship (south-west Poland)
- Gajówka, Prudnik County (south-west Poland)
- Gajówka, Kuyavian-Pomeranian Voivodeship (north-central Poland)
- Gajówka, Podlaskie Voivodeship (north-east Poland)
- Gajówka, Subcarpathian Voivodeship (south-east Poland)
- Gajówka, Greater Poland Voivodeship (west-central Poland)
- Gajówka, Gliwice County in Silesian Voivodeship (south Poland)
- Gajówka, Warmian-Masurian Voivodeship (north Poland)
