= Smolarzyny =

- Village
- Location within Poland
- Coordinates: 50°7′N 22°16′E
- Country: Poland
- Voivodeship: Subcarpathian
- County: Łańcut
- Gmina: Żołynia
- Time zone: UTC+1 (CET)
  - Summer (DST): UTC+2 (CEST)
- Vehicle registration: RLA

Smolarzyny [smɔlaˈʐɨnɨ] is a village in the administrative district of Gmina Żołynia, within Łańcut County, Subcarpathian Voivodeship, in south-eastern Poland.

Four Polish citizens were murdered by Nazi Germany in the village during World War II.
