= Kopanie Zmysłowskie =

- Village
- Location within Poland
- Coordinates: 50°09′43″N 22°23′34″E
- Country: Poland
- Voivodeship: Podkarpackie
- County: Łańcut
- Gmina: Żołynia

Kopanie Zmysłowskie (Polish pronunciation: [kɔˈpaɲɛ zmɨˈswɔfskʲɛ]) is a village in the administrative district of Gmina Żołynia, within Łańcut County, Podkarpackie Voivodeship, in south-eastern Poland.
