= Zalesie, Łańcut County =

Zalesie
- Village
- Location within Poland
- Coordinates: 50°9′N 22°10′E
- Country: Poland
- Voivodeship: Subcarpathian
- County: Łańcut
- Gmina: Czarna
- Elevation: 250 m (820 ft)
- Population: 850

Zalesie [zaˈlɛɕɛ] is a village in the administrative district of Gmina Czarna, within Łańcut County, Subcarpathian Voivodeship, in south-eastern Poland.
