= Kopanie Żołyńskie =

- Village
- Location within Poland
- Coordinates: 50°9′42″N 22°21′48″E
- Country: Poland
- Voivodeship: Subcarpathian
- County: Łańcut
- Gmina: Żołynia

Kopanie Żołyńskie [kɔˈpaɲɛ ʐɔˈwɨɲskʲɛ] is a village in the administrative district of Gmina Żołynia, within Łańcut County, Subcarpathian Voivodeship, in south-eastern Poland.
