= Dąbrówki, Podkarpackie Voivodeship =

Dąbrówki
- Village
- Location within Poland
- Coordinates: 50°7′N 22°13′E
- Country: Poland
- Voivodeship: Subcarpathian
- County: Łańcut
- Gmina: Czarna

Dąbrówki (Polish pronunciation: [dɔmˈbrufkʲi]) is a village in the administrative district of Gmina Czarna, within Łańcut County, Subcarpathian Voivodeship, in south-eastern Poland.
