= Pogwizdów, Podkarpackie Voivodeship =

Pogwizdów
- Village
- Location within Poland
- Coordinates: 50°7′N 22°9′E
- Country: Poland
- Voivodeship: Subcarpathian
- County: Łańcut
- Gmina: Czarna

Pogwizdów [pɔɡˈvizduf] is a village in the administrative district of Gmina Czarna, within Łańcut County, Subcarpathian Voivodeship, in south-eastern Poland.
