= Węgliska, Podkarpackie Voivodeship =

Węgliska
- Village
- Location within Poland
- Coordinates: 50°9′54″N 22°12′6″E
- Country: Poland
- Voivodeship: Subcarpathian
- County: Łańcut
- Gmina: Rakszawa
- Highest elevation: 250 m (820 ft)
- Lowest elevation: 200 m (660 ft)
- Population (approx.): 450

Węgliska [vɛŋˈɡliska] is a village in the administrative district of Gmina Rakszawa, within Łańcut County, Subcarpathian Voivodeship, in south-eastern Poland.

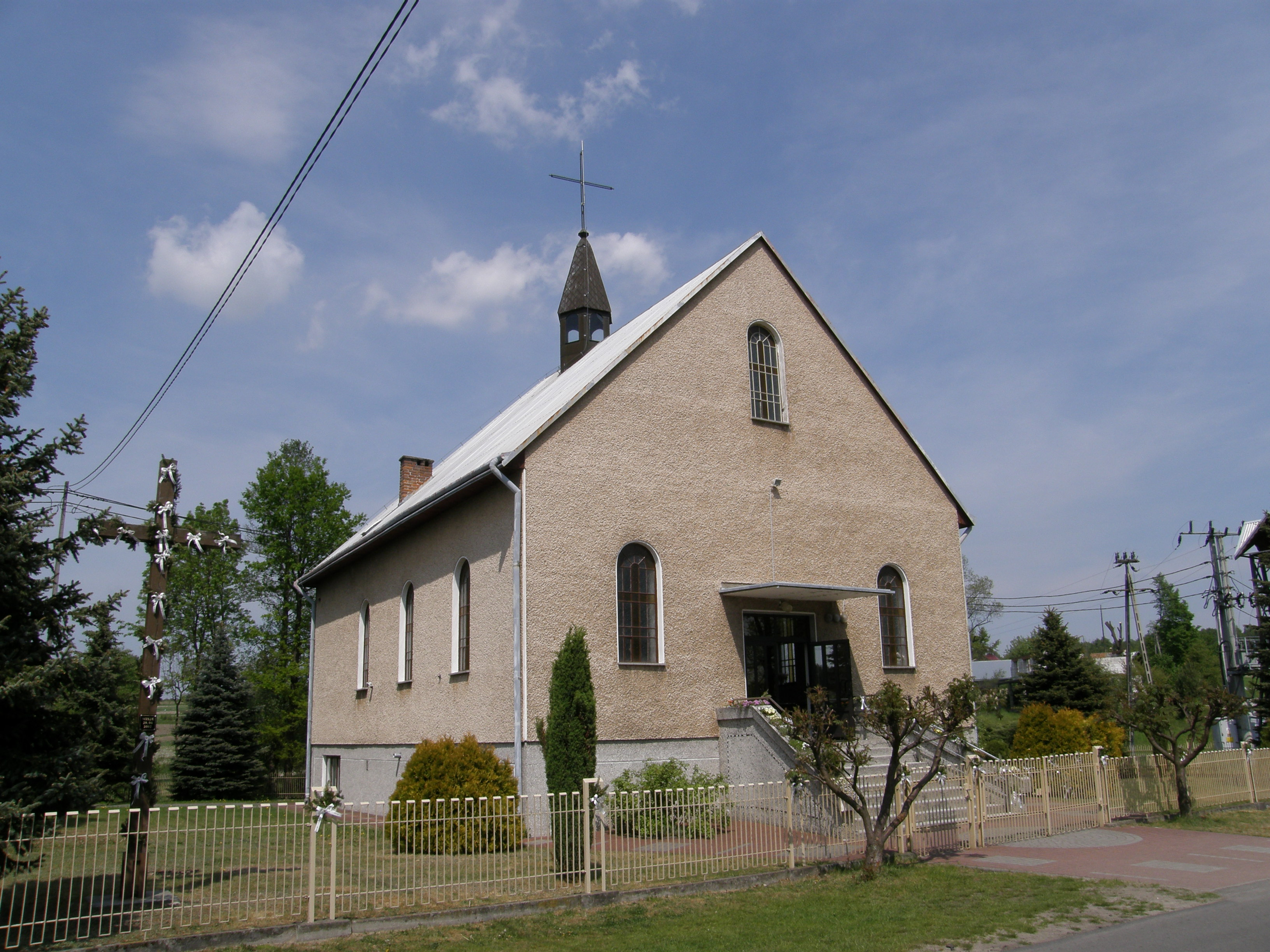
Church

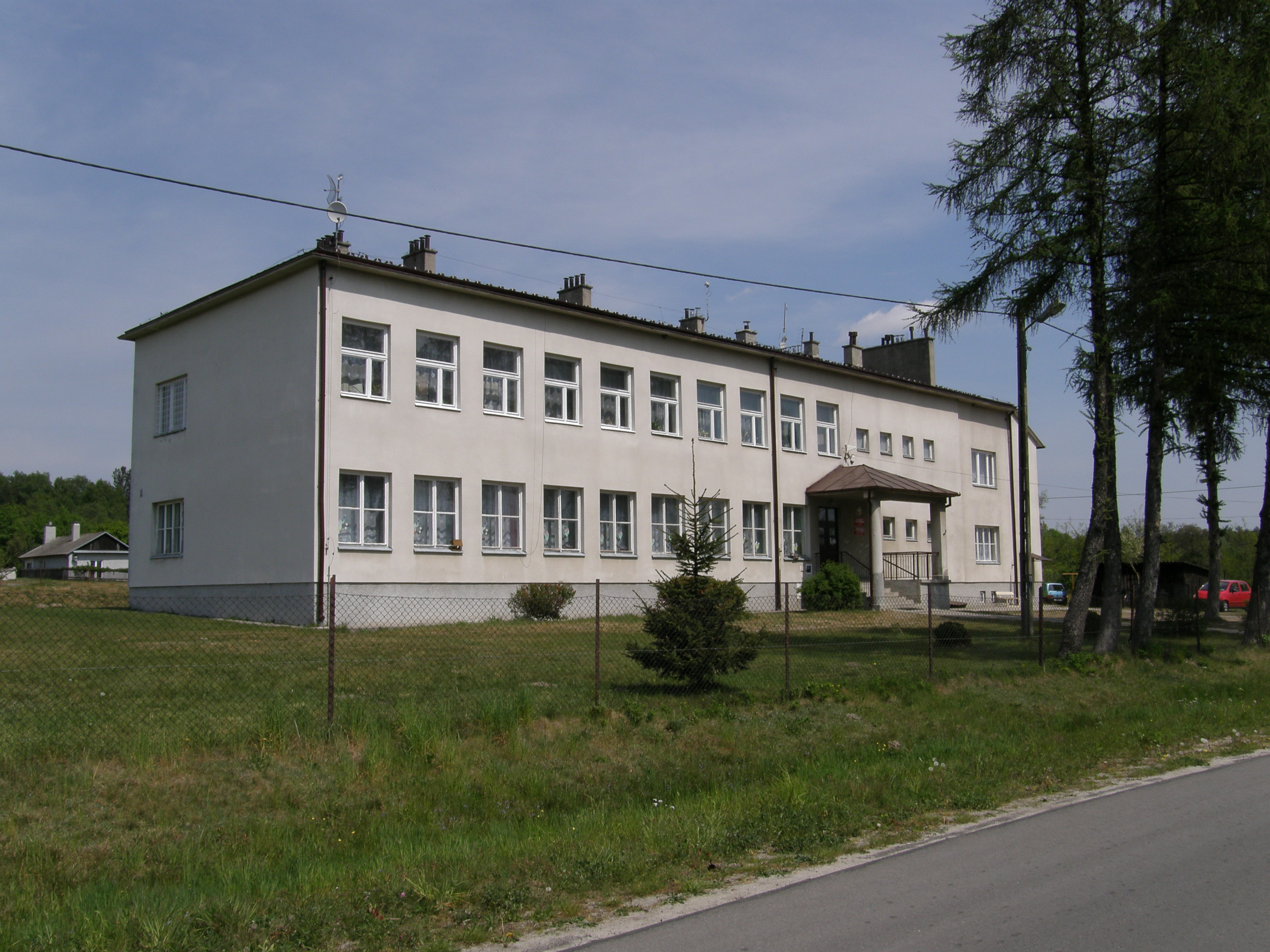
Primary school & library
