= Wydrze =

- Village
- Location within Poland
- Coordinates: 50°12′N 22°15′E
- Country: Poland
- Voivodeship: Subcarpathian
- County: Łańcut
- Gmina: Rakszawa

Wydrze [ˈvɨdʐɛ] is a village in the administrative district of Gmina Rakszawa, within Łańcut County, Subcarpathian Voivodeship, in south-eastern Poland. Strona miejscowosci: www.wydrze.pl.

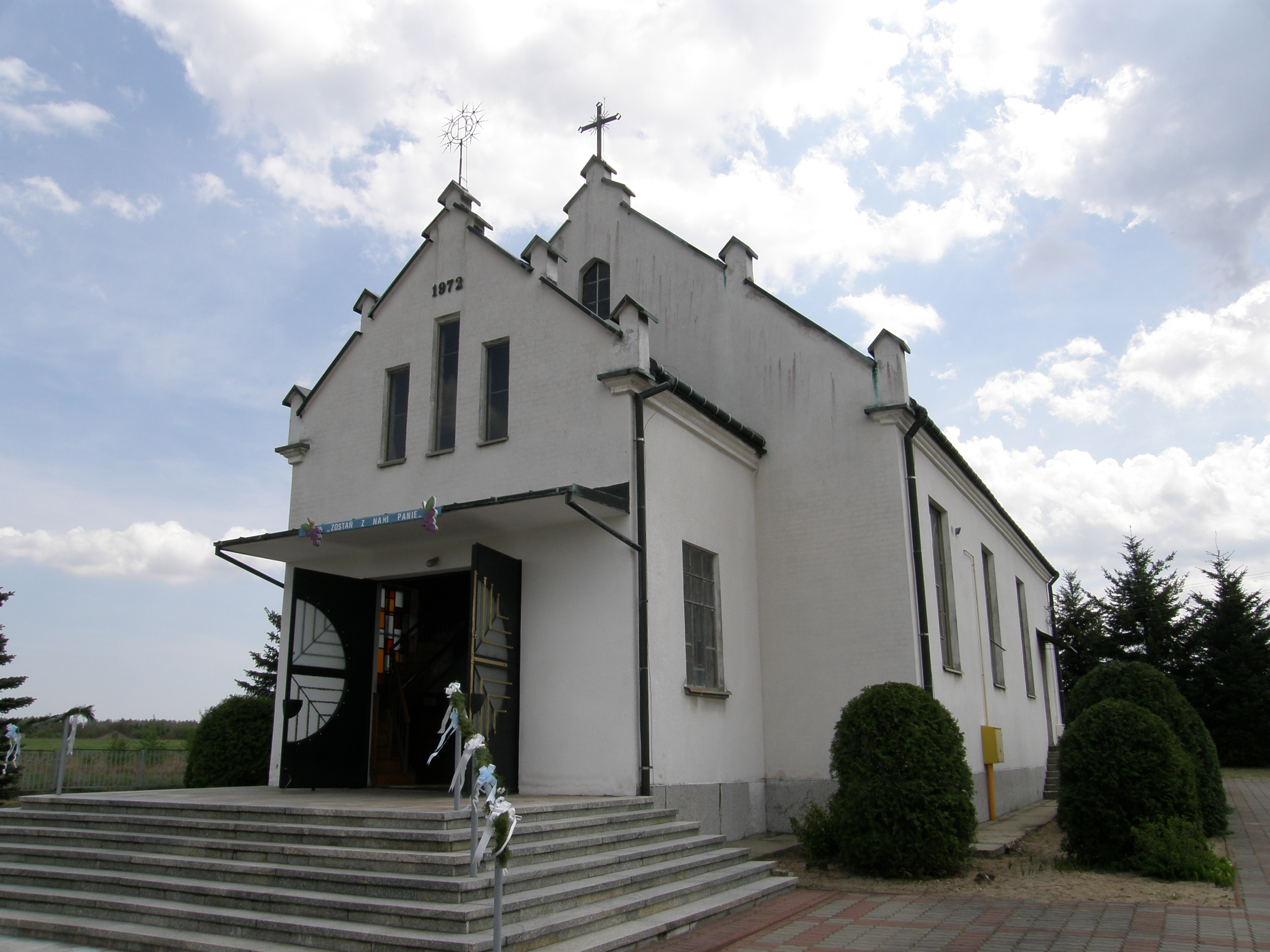
Church

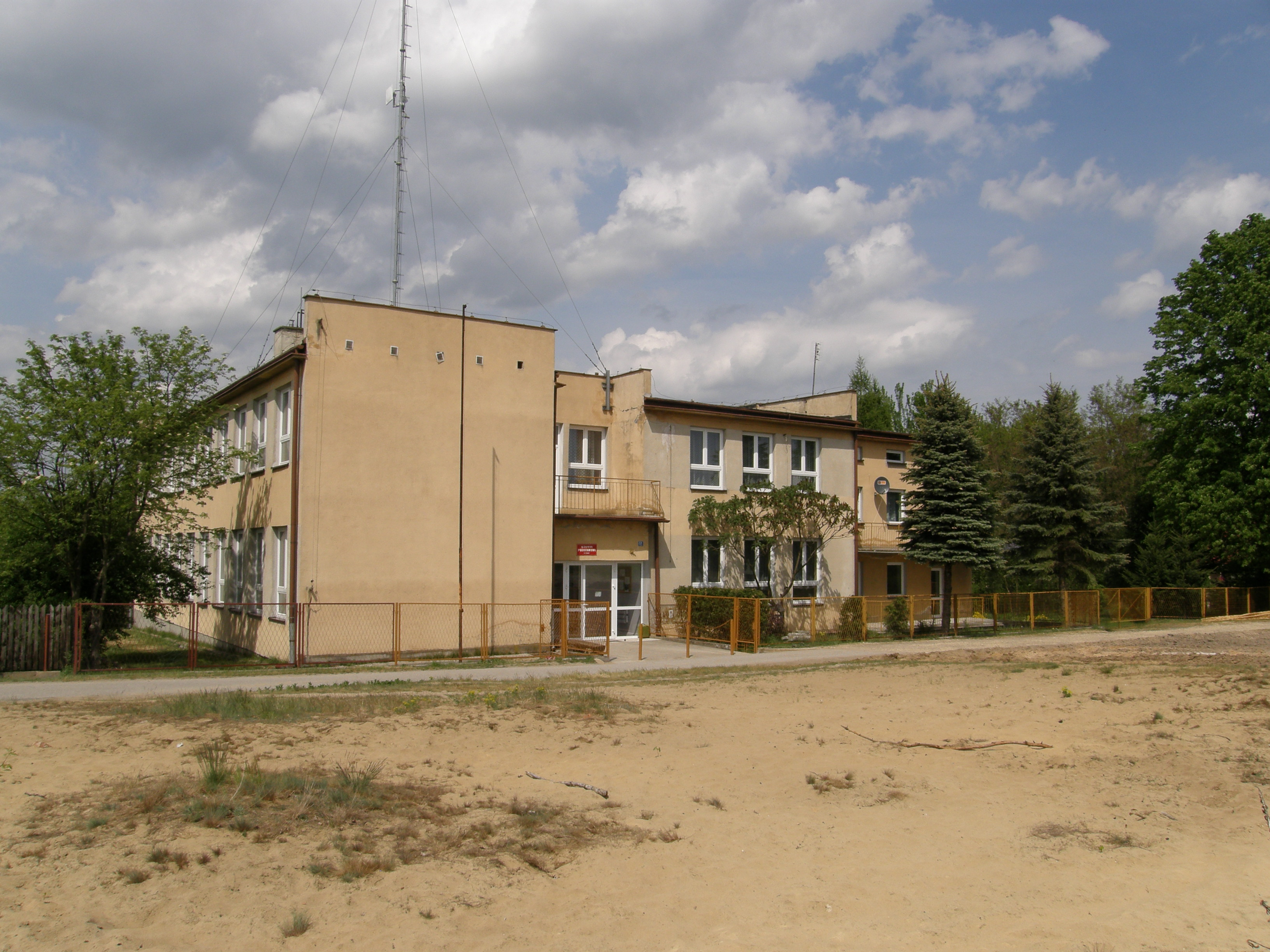
Primary school

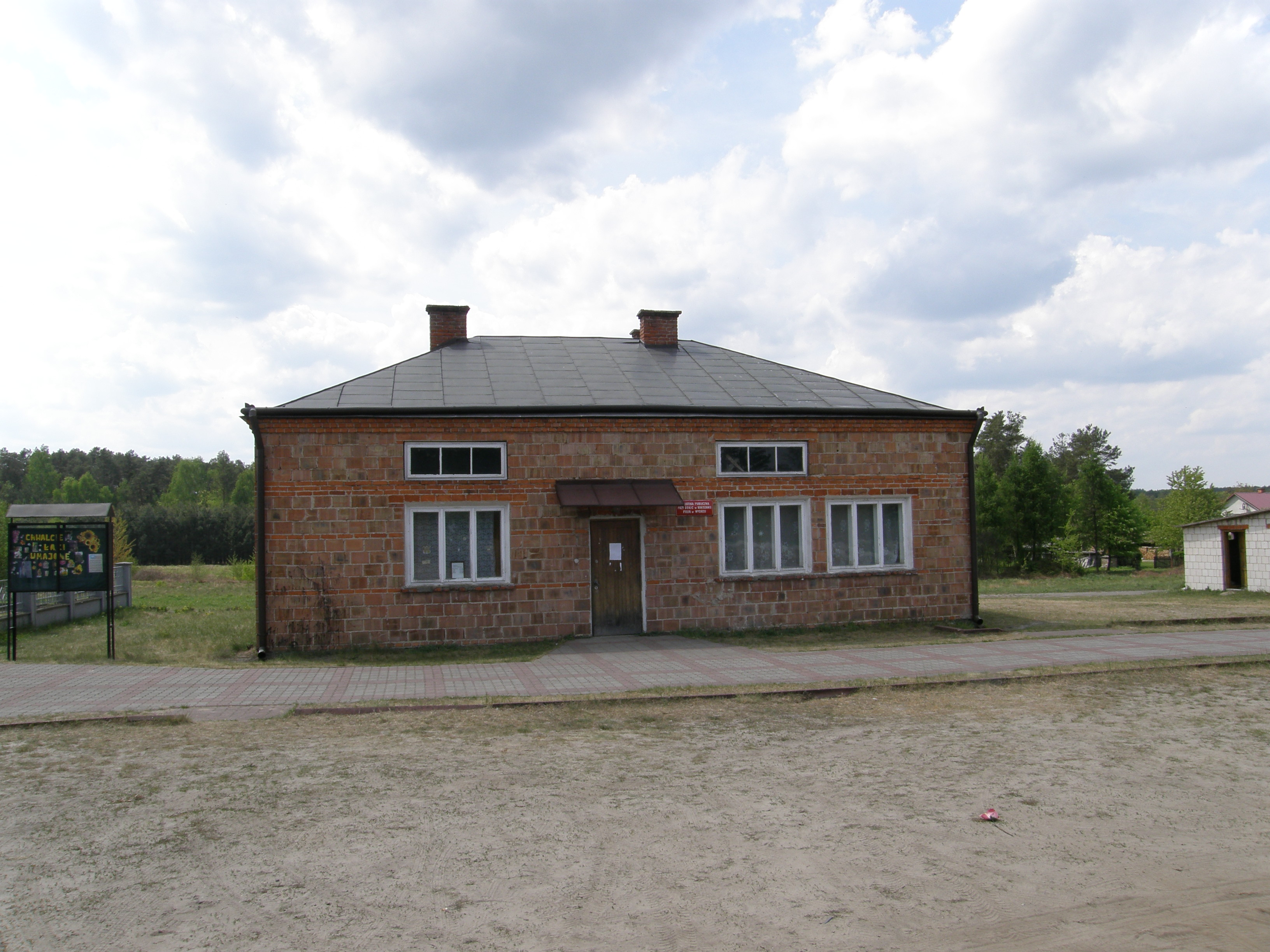
Library
