= Brzóza Stadnicka =

- Village
- Location within Poland
- Coordinates: 50°12′N 22°17′E
- Country: Poland
- Voivodeship: Subcarpathian
- County: Łańcut
- Gmina: Żołynia
- Population: 1,200

Brzóza Stadnicka [ˈbʐuza stadˈɲit͡ska] is a village in the administrative district of Gmina Żołynia, within Łańcut County, Subcarpathian Voivodeship, in south-eastern Poland.
