= Gmina Czarna =

Gmina Czarna may refer to any of the following rural administrative districts in Subcarpathian Voivodeship, Poland:

- Gmina Czarna, Bieszczady County
- Gmina Czarna, Dębica County
- Gmina Czarna, Łańcut County
