= Medynia Łańcucka =

- Village
- Location within Poland
- Coordinates: 50°07′50″N 22°08′30″E
- Country: Poland
- Voivodeship: Podkarpackie
- County: Łańcut
- Gmina: Czarna
- Elevation: 220 m (720 ft)
- Population: 900

Medynia Łańcucka (Polish pronunciation: [mɛˈdɨɲa waj̃ˈt͡sut͡ska]) is a village in the administrative district of Gmina Czarna, within Łańcut County, Podkarpackie Voivodeship, in south-eastern Poland.
