= Krzemienica, Łańcut County =

Krzemienica
- Village
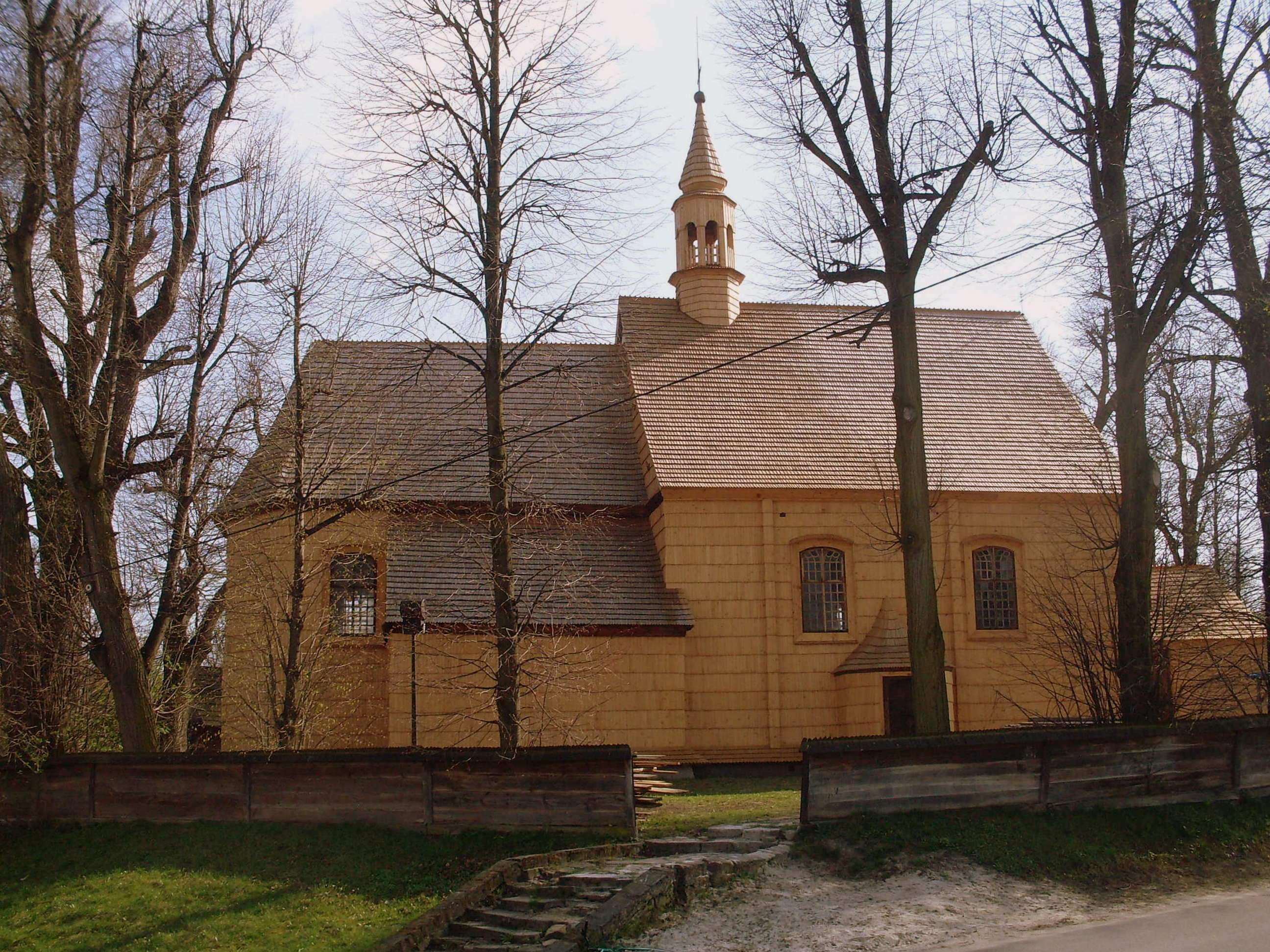
- Church of Saint James the Elder

- Location within Poland
- Coordinates: 50°4′21″N 22°11′23″E
- Country: Poland
- Voivodeship: Subcarpathian
- County: Łańcut
- Gmina: Czarna
- Website: http://www.krzemienica.pl

Krzemienica [kʂɛmjɛˈnit͡sa] is a village in the administrative district of Gmina Czarna, within Łańcut County, Subcarpathian Voivodeship, in south-eastern Poland.
