= Wola Mała, Podkarpackie Voivodeship =

Wola Mała
- Village
- Location within Poland
- Coordinates: 50°5′47″N 22°13′14″E
- Country: Poland
- Voivodeship: Subcarpathian
- County: Łańcut
- Gmina: Czarna
- Population: 1,000

Wola Mała [ˈvɔla ˈmawa] is a village in the administrative district of Gmina Czarna, within Łańcut County, Subcarpathian Voivodeship, in south-eastern Poland.
