= Kąty Rakszawskie =

- Village
- Location within Poland
- Coordinates: 50°11′8″N 22°10′56″E
- Country: Poland
- Voivodeship: Subcarpathian
- County: Łańcut
- Gmina: Rakszawa

Kąty Rakszawskie [ˈkɔntɨ rakˈʂafskʲɛ] is a village in the administrative district of Gmina Rakszawa, within Łańcut County, Subcarpathian Voivodeship, in south-eastern Poland.
