= Zagóra, Podkarpackie Voivodeship =

Zagóra
- Village
- Location within Poland
- Coordinates: 50°10′04″N 22°21′51″E
- Country: Poland
- Voivodeship: Podkarpackie
- County: Łańcut
- Gmina: Żołynia

Zagóra [zaˈɡura] is a village in the administrative district of Gmina Żołynia, within Łańcut County, Podkarpackie Voivodeship, in south-eastern Poland.
