= Bargłówka, Silesian Voivodeship =

Bargłówka
- Village
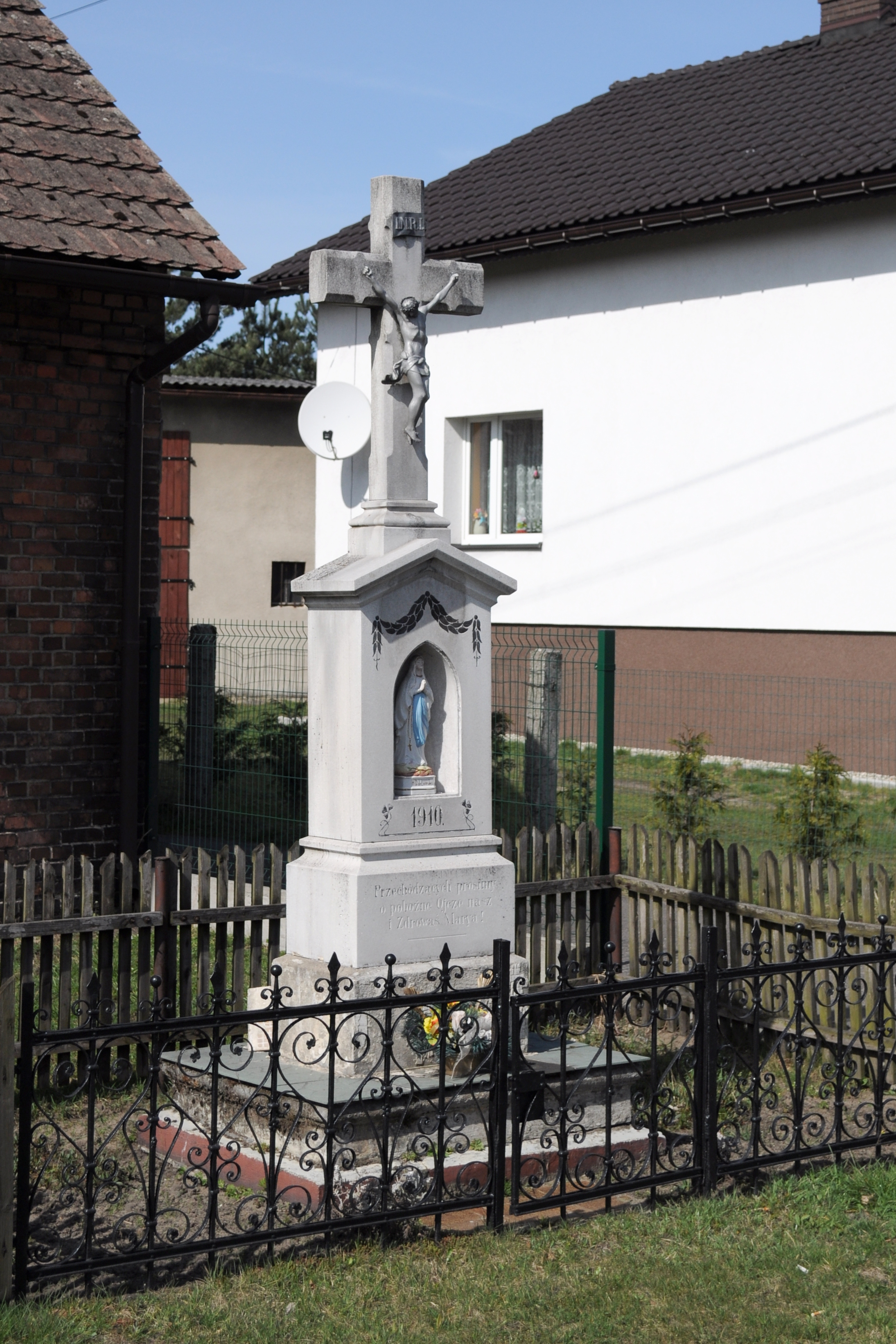
- Roadside cross

- Location within Poland
- Coordinates: 50°13′N 18°28′E
- Country: Poland
- Voivodeship: Silesian
- County: Gliwice
- Gmina: Sośnicowice
- Population: 762

Bargłówka [barˈɡwufka] is a village in the administrative district of Gmina Sośnicowice, within Gliwice County, Silesian Voivodeship, in southern Poland.
