= Sośnicowice =

Sośnicowice Sośnicowice (Polish), Kieferstädtel (German)
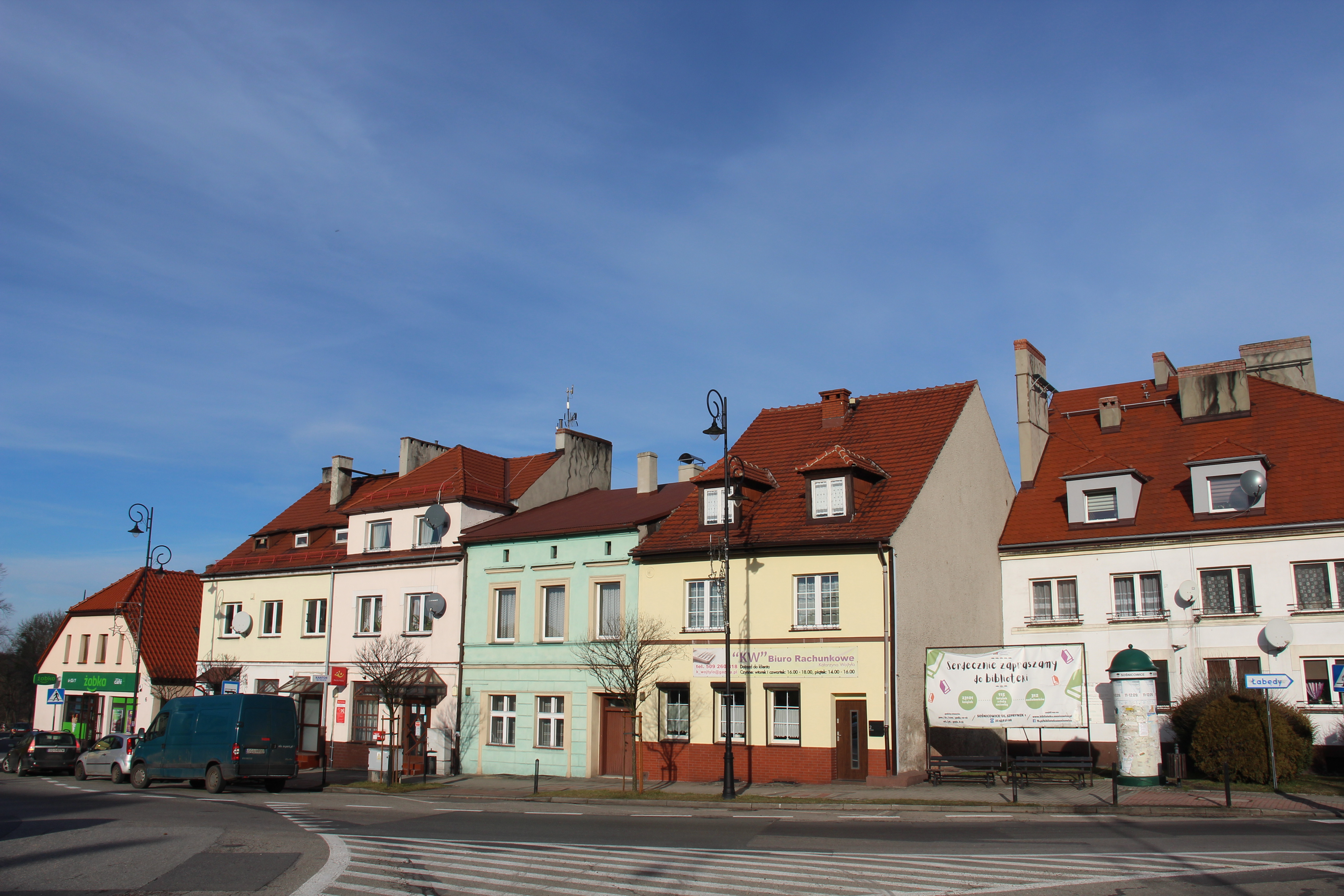
- Central square

- Flag Coat of arms

- Location within Poland
- Coordinates: 50°17′0″N 18°32′0″E
- Country: Poland
- Voivodeship: Silesian
- County: Gliwice
- Gmina: Sośnicowice
- First mentioned: 1305

Government
  - Mayor: Leszek Kołodziej

Area
  - Total: 11.68 km^{2} (4.51 sq mi)
- Elevation: 250 m (820 ft)

Population (2019-06-30)
  - Total: 1,919
  - Density: 164.3/km^{2} (425.5/sq mi)
- Time zone: UTC+1 (CET)
  - Summer (DST): UTC+2 (CEST)
- Postal code: 44-153
- Car plates: SGL
- Climate: Cfb
- Primary airport: Katowice Airport
- Website: http://www.sosnicowice.pl/

Sośnicowice (Polish: [sɔɕɲit͡sɔˈvit͡sɛ]) (German: Kieferstädtel German: [ˈkiːfɛɐ̯ʃtɛtəl]) is a town in Gliwice County, Silesian Voivodeship, Poland, with 1,919 inhabitants (2019). It is the capital of Gmina Sośnicowice, which has been officially bilingual in Polish and German since 2013.

== Geography ==
Sośnicowice is located in Upper Silesia on the Kłodnica and Bierawka rivers on the western edge of the Upper Silesian Industrial Region, about 8 km (5 mi) southwest of the center of Gliwice.

== History ==
The town was first mentioned in 1305 when it was part of the Duchy of Opole within fragmented Piast-ruled Poland. The name of the town is of Polish origin and comes from the word sosna which means "pine".

It eventually fell under suzerainty of the Bohemian Crown (within the Habsburg monarchy since 1526), however, it remained ruled by the Opole line of the Polish Piast dynasty until 1532. In 1526, it was granted town rights by Ferdinand I, for which the forest had been cleared by residents who immigrated from Bohemia. At first, Czech immigrants spoke Czech, but gradually the Czech language was replaced by Polish again. The town passed into the possession of various noble families. Soon afterwards, the Reformation took hold in the town, after which the parish church was taken over by the Protestants in 1555, in whose hands it remained until 1679. With the Counter-Reformation of the Habsburgs, the city was re-Catholicized. The town was devastated by Swedish troops during the Thirty Years' War in 1626.

The town became part of the Kingdom of Prussia in 1742, after the First Silesian War. During the Seven Years' War from 1756 to 1763, it was burned to the ground. The town was subjected to Germanisation policies, and in the 1860s, Polish was still dominant in the town, however, already about a third of the inhabitants spoke German. In January 1871, the town, known in German as Kieferstädtel became part of the German Empire and was located in the Tost-Gleiwitz district in the Prussian Province of Silesia. In the 1921 Upper Silesia plebiscite, 78.3% of the residents of Kieferstädtel voted to remain in Germany. During the Kristallnacht in 1938, the wooden buildings on the small Jewish cemetery southeast of Kieferstädtel were burned down. At that time, however, there were no longer any Jews living in the town.

Towards the end of World War II, the town was captured by the Red Army on January 27, 1945. After the end of the war, the town became again part of Poland under the terms of the Potsdam Agreement.

== Demographics ==
Historical population

Year	Pop.	±%
1871	1,015	—
1880	1,056	+4.0%
1890	1,015	−3.9%
1900	1,025	+1.0%

Year	Pop.	±%
1910	969	−5.5%
1933	1,947	+100.9%
2010	1,715	−11.9%

== Sights ==
Landmarks of Sośnicowice include the Baroque Sośnicowice Palace and Saint James church.

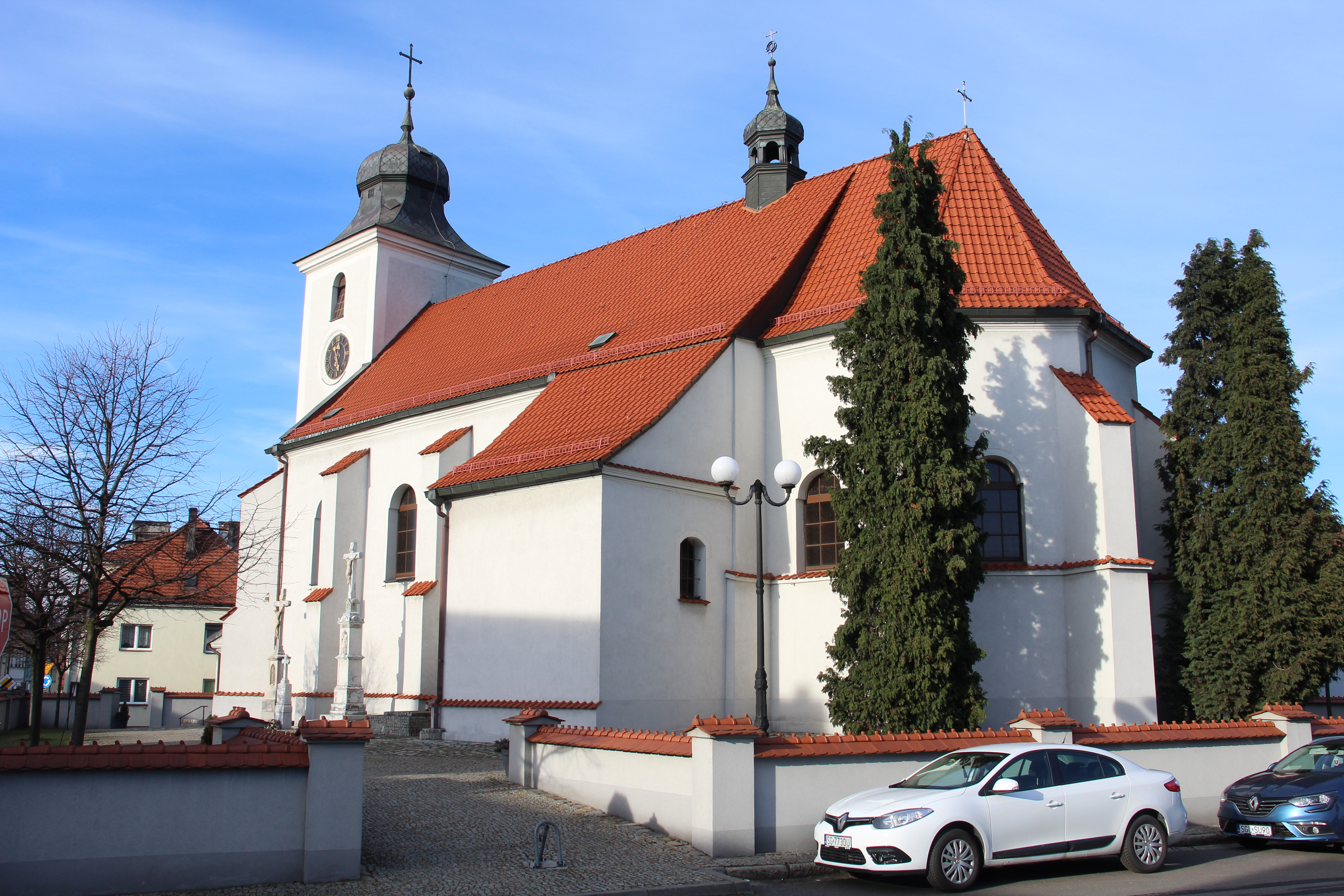
Saint James church

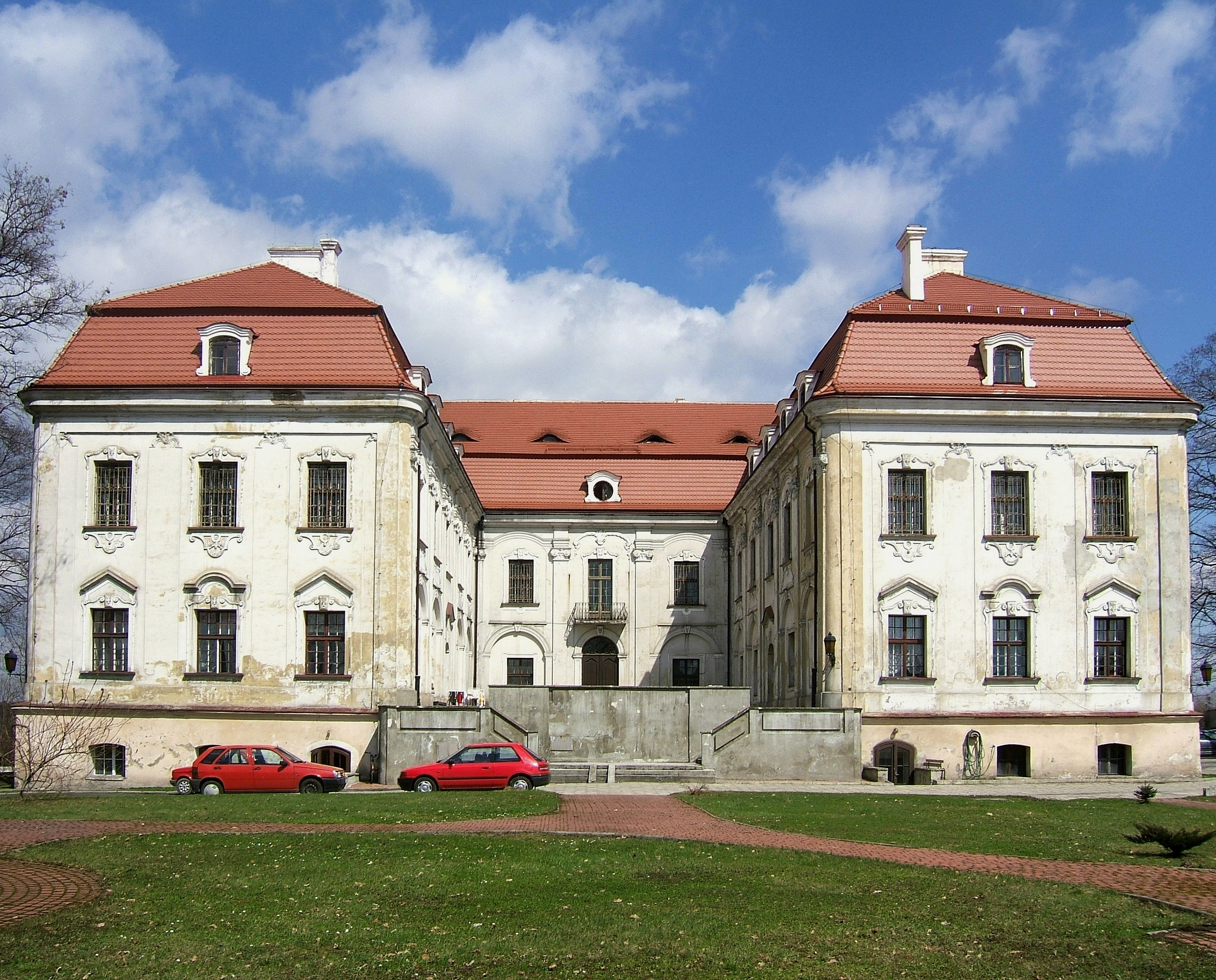
Sośnicowice Palace

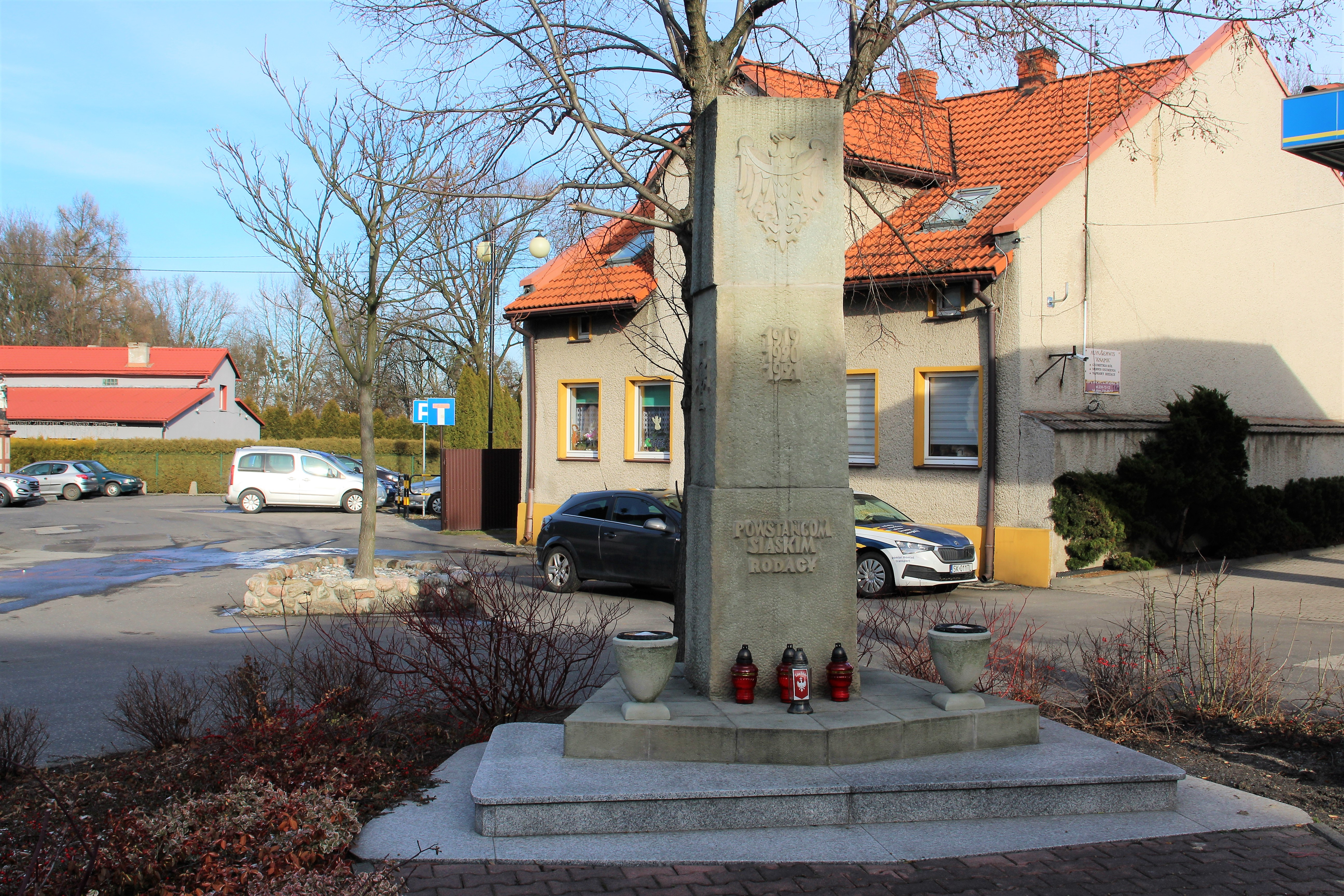
Monument to the insurgents of the Silesian Uprisings

== Twin towns – sister cities ==
See twin towns of Gmina Sośnicowice.
