= Gmina Sośnicowice =

Gmina Sośnicowice Sośnicowice Commune
- Gmina
- Coat of arms
- Interactive map of Gmina Sośnicowice
- Coordinates (Sośnicowice): 50°17′0″N 18°32′0″E
- Country: Poland
- Voivodeship: Silesian
- County: Gliwice
- Seat: Sośnicowice

Area
  - Total: 116.24 km^{2} (44.88 sq mi)

Population (2019-06-30)
  - Total: 8,894
  - Density: 76.51/km^{2} (198.2/sq mi)
  - Urban: 1,919
  - Rural: 6,975
- Website: http://www.sosnicowice.pl/

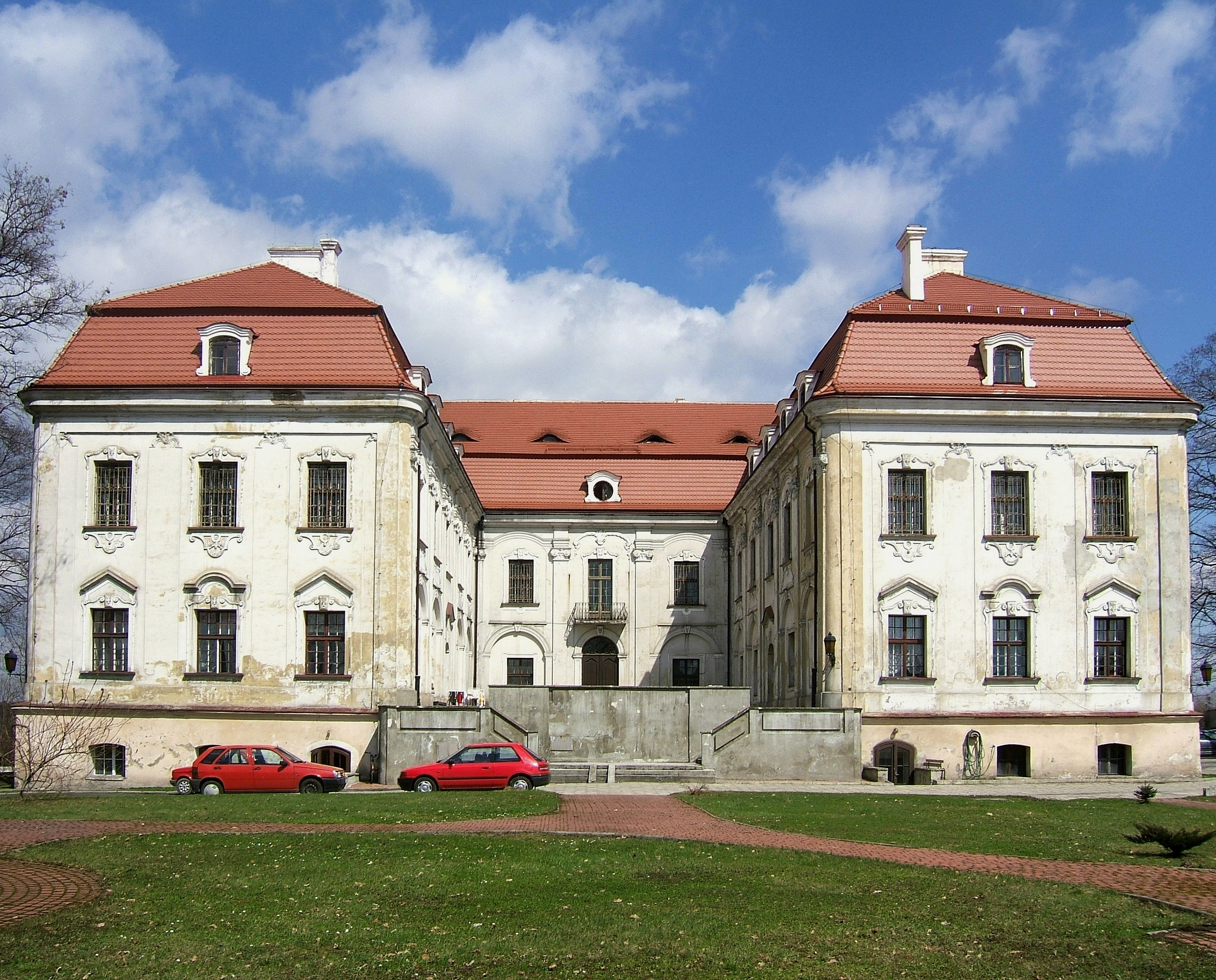
Sosnicowice castle

Gmina Sośnicowice is an urban-rural gmina (administrative district) in Gliwice County, Silesian Voivodeship, in southern Poland. Its seat is the town of Sośnicowice, which lies approximately 10 kilometres (6 mi) west of Gliwice and 34 km (21 mi) west of the regional capital Katowice.

The gmina covers an area of 116.24 square kilometres (44.9 sq mi), and as of 2019, its total population was 8,894.

The gmina contains part of the protected area called the Rudy Landscape Park.

== Villages ==
Apart from the town of Sośnicowice, Gmina Sośnicowice contains the villages and settlements of Bargłówka, Gajówka, Kozłów, Kuźniczka, Łany Wielkie, Nowa Wieś, Podlesie, Rachowice, Sierakowice, Sierakowiczki, Smolnica, Trachy, Tworóg Mały, Wesoła and Zamoście.

== Neighbouring gminas ==
Gmina Sośnicowice is bordered by the city of Gliwice and by the gminas of Bierawa, Kuźnia Raciborska, Pilchowice and Rudziniec.

== Twin towns – sister cities ==
Gmina Sośnicowice is twinned with:

- Linden, Germany
- Loučná nad Desnou, Czech Republic
