= Medynia Głogowska =

- Village
- Location within Poland
- Coordinates: 50°9′32″N 22°8′17″E
- Country: Poland
- Voivodeship: Subcarpathian
- County: Łańcut
- Gmina: Czarna
- Elevation: 230 m (750 ft)
- Population: 1,650

Medynia Głogowska [mɛˈdɨɲa ɡwɔˈɡɔfska] is a village in the administrative district of Gmina Czarna, within Łańcut County, Subcarpathian Voivodeship, in south-eastern Poland.
