= Gmina Żołynia =

Gmina Żołynia Żołynia Commune
- Gmina
- Flag Coat of arms
- Interactive map of Gmina Żołynia
- Coordinates (Żołynia): 50°10′43″N 22°19′27″E
- Country: Poland
- Voivodeship: Subcarpathian
- County: Łańcut
- Seat: Żołynia

Area
  - Total: 56.8 km^{2} (21.9 sq mi)

Population (2011)
  - Total: 6,860
  - Density: 121/km^{2} (313/sq mi)
- Website: http://www.zolynia.pl

Gmina Żołynia is a rural gmina (administrative district) in Łańcut County, Subcarpathian Voivodeship, in south-eastern Poland. Its seat is the village of Żołynia, which lies approximately 15 kilometres (9 mi) north-east of Łańcut and 28 km (17 mi) north-east of the regional capital Rzeszów.

The gmina covers an area of 56.8 square kilometres (21.9 sq mi), and as of 2006 its total population is 6,664 (6,860 in 2011).

== Villages ==
Gmina Żołynia contains the villages and settlements of Brzóza Stadnicka, Gajówka, Kopanie Zmysłowskie, Kopanie Żołyńskie, Smolarzyny, Zagóra and Żołynia.

== Neighbouring gminas ==
Gmina Żołynia is bordered by the gminas of Białobrzegi, Czarna, Grodzisko Dolne, Leżajsk and Rakszawa.
