= Sierakowiczki =

- Village
- Location within Poland
- Coordinates: 50°16′11″N 18°26′39″E
- Country: Poland
- Voivodeship: Silesian
- County: Gliwice
- Gmina: Sośnicowice

Sierakowiczki [ɕɛrakɔˈvit͡ʂki] is a village in the administrative district of Gmina Sośnicowice, within Gliwice County, Silesian Voivodeship, in southern Poland.
