= Gajówka, Podkarpackie Voivodeship =

Gajówka
- Village
- Location within Poland
- Coordinates: 50°08′59″N 22°20′52″E
- Country: Poland
- Voivodeship: Subcarpathian
- County: Łańcut
- Gmina: Żołynia

Gajówka [ɡaˈjufka] is a village in the administrative district of Gmina Żołynia, within Łańcut County, Subcarpathian Voivodeship, in south-eastern Poland.
