= Podlesie, Gliwice County =

Podlesie
- Village
- Location within Poland
- Coordinates: 50°18′17″N 18°32′42″E
- Country: Poland
- Voivodeship: Silesian
- County: Gliwice
- Gmina: Sośnicowice

Podlesie [pɔdˈlɛɕɛ] is a village in the administrative district of Gmina Sośnicowice, within Gliwice County, Silesian Voivodeship, in southern Poland.
