= Łany Wielkie, Gliwice County =

Łany Wielkie
- Village
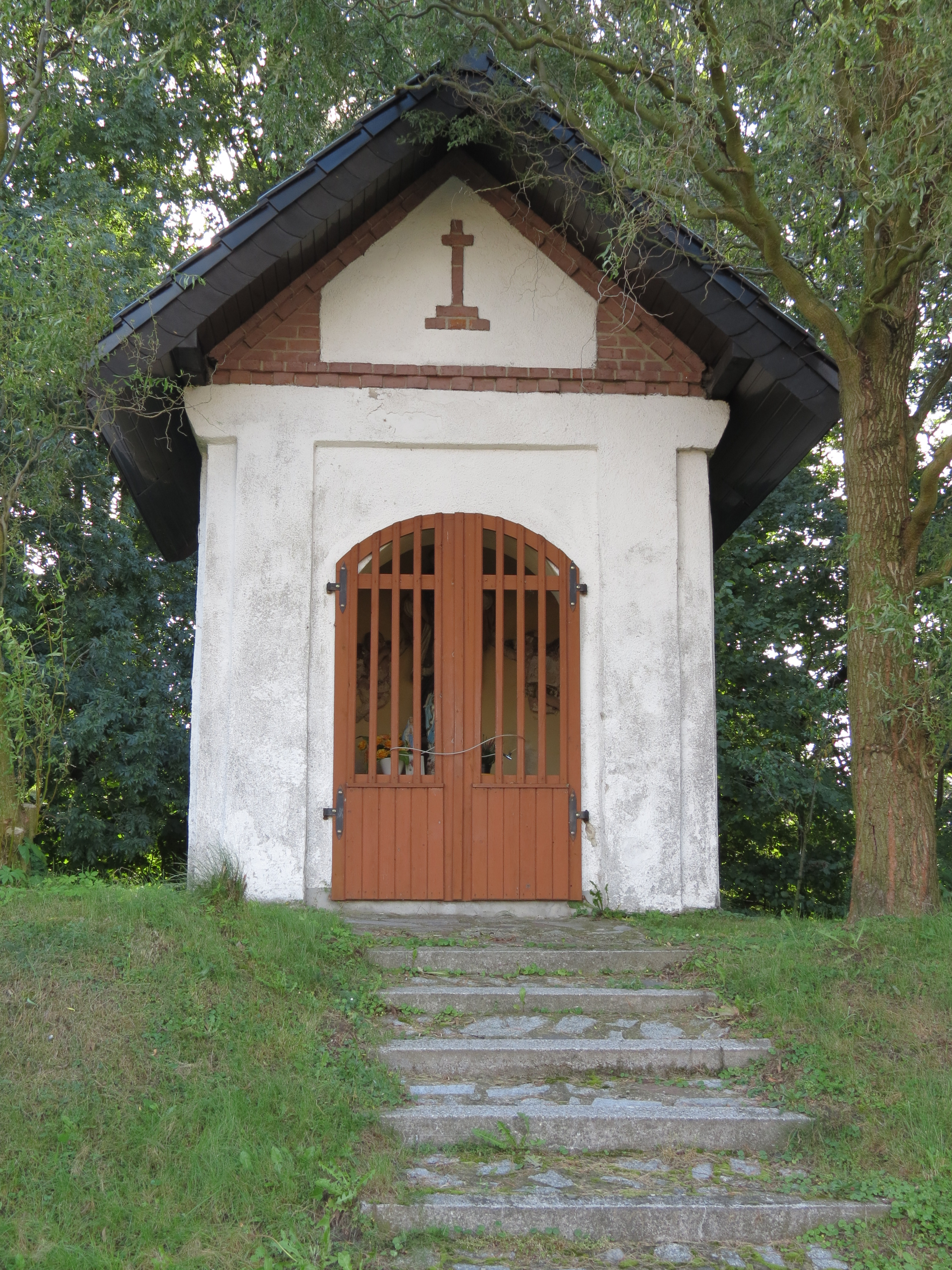
- Chapel

- Location within Poland
- Coordinates: 50°17′N 18°32′E
- Country: Poland
- Voivodeship: Silesian
- County: Gliwice
- Gmina: Sośnicowice
- Population: 748

Łany Wielkie [ˈwanɨ ˈvjɛlkʲɛ] is a village in the administrative district of Gmina Sośnicowice, within Gliwice County, Silesian Voivodeship, in southern Poland.
