= Gmina Rakszawa =

Gmina Rakszawa Rakszawa Commune
- Gmina
- Coat of arms
- Interactive map of Gmina Rakszawa
- Coordinates (Rakszawa): 50°9′N 22°15′E
- Country: Poland
- Voivodeship: Subcarpathian
- County: Łańcut
- Seat: Rakszawa

Area
  - Total: 66.37 km^{2} (25.63 sq mi)

Population (2011)
  - Total: 7,288
  - Density: 109.8/km^{2} (284.4/sq mi)
- Website: http://www.rakszawa.itl.pl

Gmina Rakszawa is a rural gmina (administrative district) in Łańcut County, Subcarpathian Voivodeship, in south-eastern Poland. Its seat is the village of Rakszawa, which lies approximately 10 kilometres (6 mi) north of Łańcut and 22 km (14 mi) north-east of the regional capital Rzeszów.

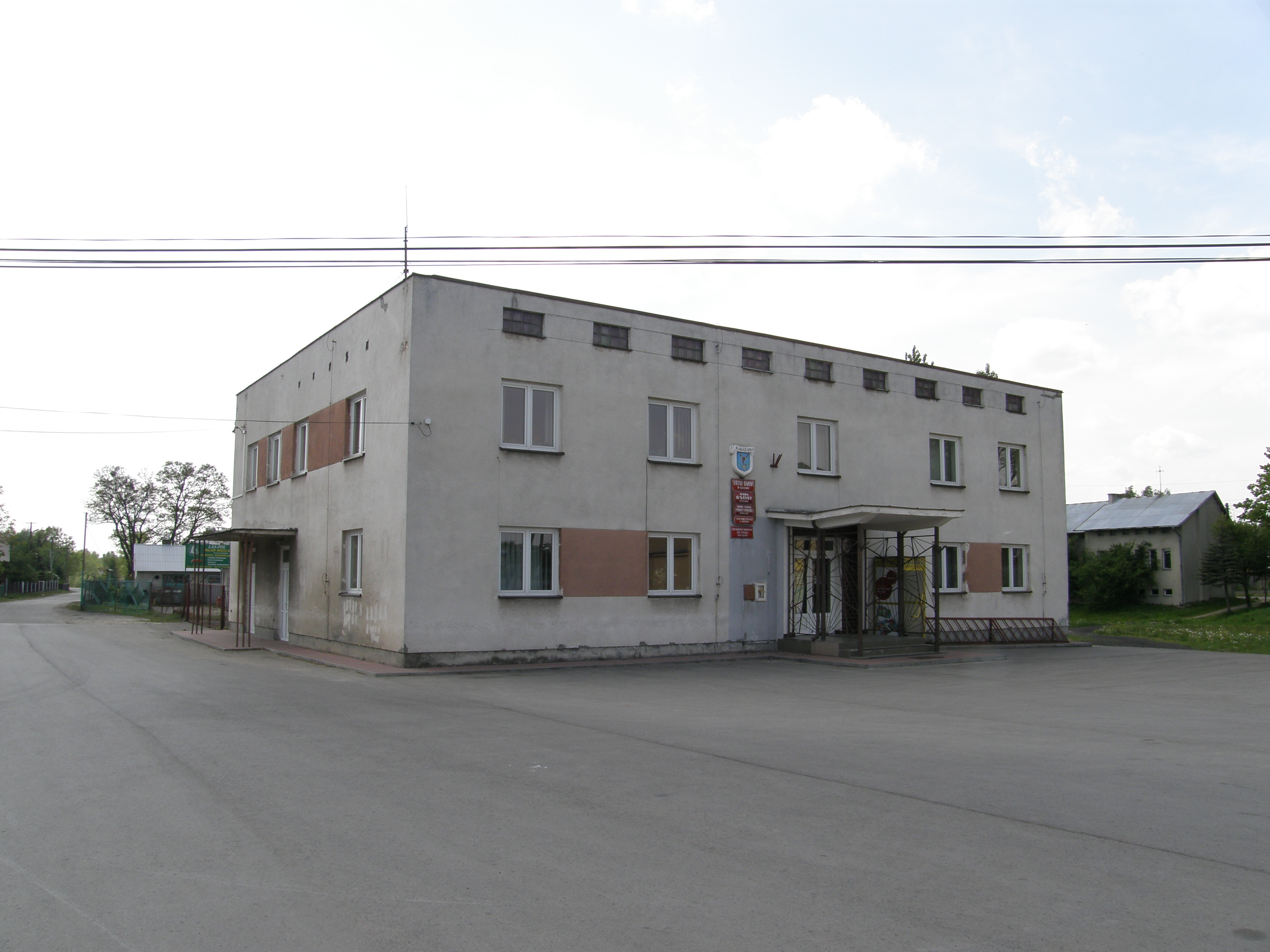

The gmina covers an area of 66.37 square kilometres (25.6 sq mi), and as of 2006 its total population is 7,170 (7,288 in 2011).

== Villages ==
Gmina Rakszawa contains the villages and settlements of Kąty Rakszawskie, Rakszawa, Węgliska and Wydrze.

== Neighbouring gminas ==
Gmina Rakszawa is bordered by the gminas of Czarna, Leżajsk, Sokołów Małopolski and Żołynia.
