= Tworóg Mały =

- Village
- Location within Poland
- Coordinates: 50°15′0″N 18°27′0″E
- Country: Poland
- Voivodeship: Silesian
- County: Gliwice
- Gmina: Sośnicowice
- Population: 200
- Website: http://www.tworogmaly.pl/

Tworóg Mały [ˈtfɔruk ˈmawɨ] is a village in the administrative district of Gmina Sośnicowice, within Gliwice County, Silesian Voivodeship, in southern Poland.
