= Wesoła, Gliwice County =

Wesoła
- Village
- Location within Poland
- Coordinates: 50°16′37″N 18°32′31″E
- Country: Poland
- Voivodeship: Silesian
- County: Gliwice
- Gmina: Sośnicowice

Wesoła [vɛˈsɔwa] is a village in the administrative district of Gmina Sośnicowice, within Gliwice County, Silesian Voivodeship, in southern Poland.
