= Kuźniczka, Silesian Voivodeship =

Kuźniczka
- Village
- Location within Poland
- Coordinates: 50°15′36″N 18°30′40″E
- Country: Poland
- Voivodeship: Silesian
- County: Gliwice
- Gmina: Sośnicowice

Kuźniczka [kuʑˈnit͡ʂka] is a village in the administrative district of Gmina Sośnicowice, within Gliwice County, Silesian Voivodeship, in southern Poland.
