= Trachy =

- Village
- Location within Poland
- Coordinates: 50°15′N 18°30′E
- Country: Poland
- Voivodeship: Silesian
- County: Gliwice
- Gmina: Sośnicowice
- Population: 791

Trachy [ˈtraxɨ] is a village in the administrative district of Gmina Sośnicowice, within Gliwice County, Silesian Voivodeship, in southern Poland.
