= Czarna, Łańcut County =

Czarna
- Village
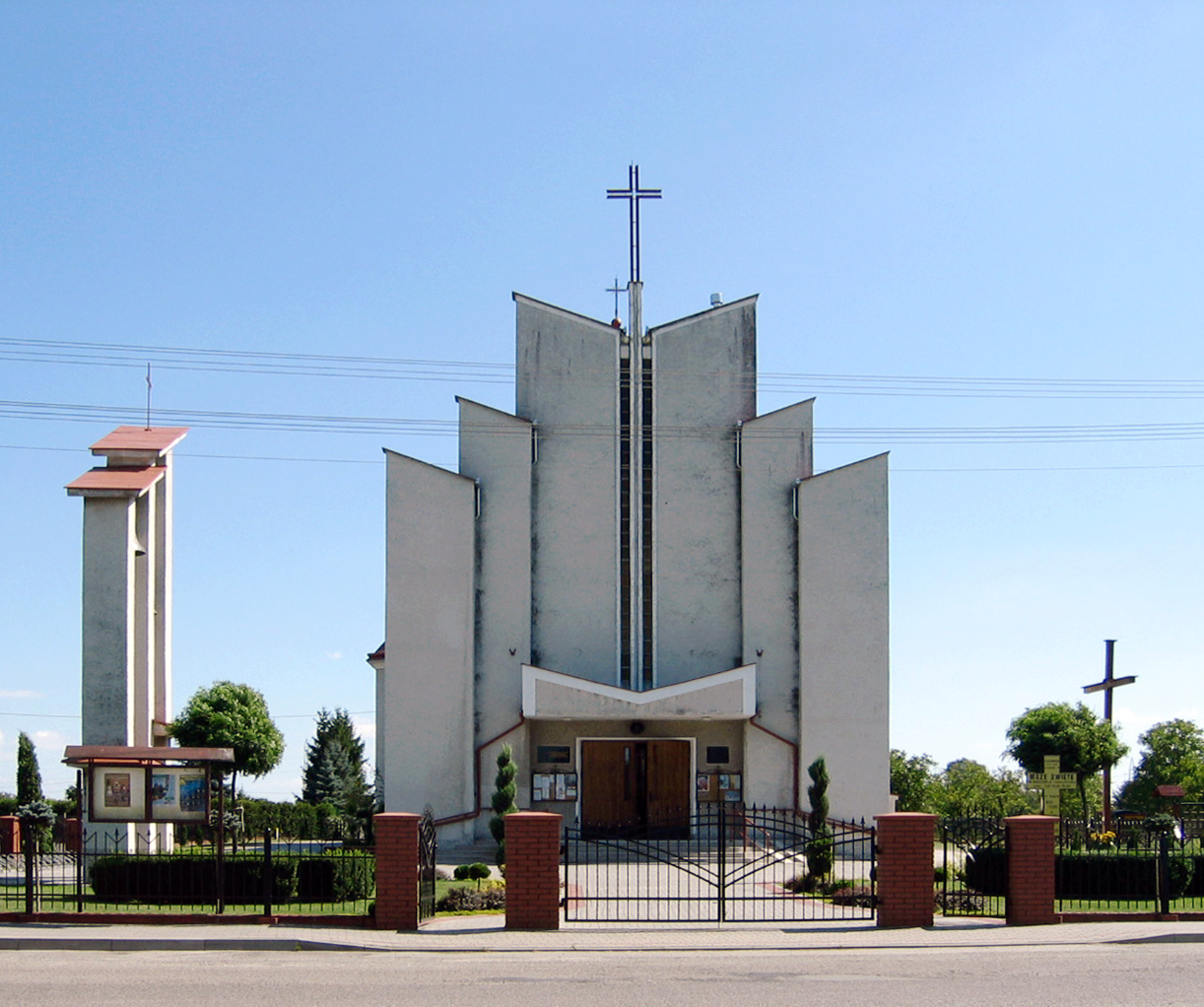
- Church

- Location within Poland
- Coordinates: 50°7′N 22°11′E
- Country: Poland
- Voivodeship: Subcarpathian
- County: Łańcut
- Gmina: Czarna
- Elevation: 200 m (660 ft)
- Population: 1,600

Czarna [ˈt͡ʂarna] is a village in Łańcut County, Subcarpathian Voivodeship, in south-eastern Poland. It is the seat of the gmina (administrative district) called Gmina Czarna.
