= Kozłów, Silesian Voivodeship =

Kozłów
- Village
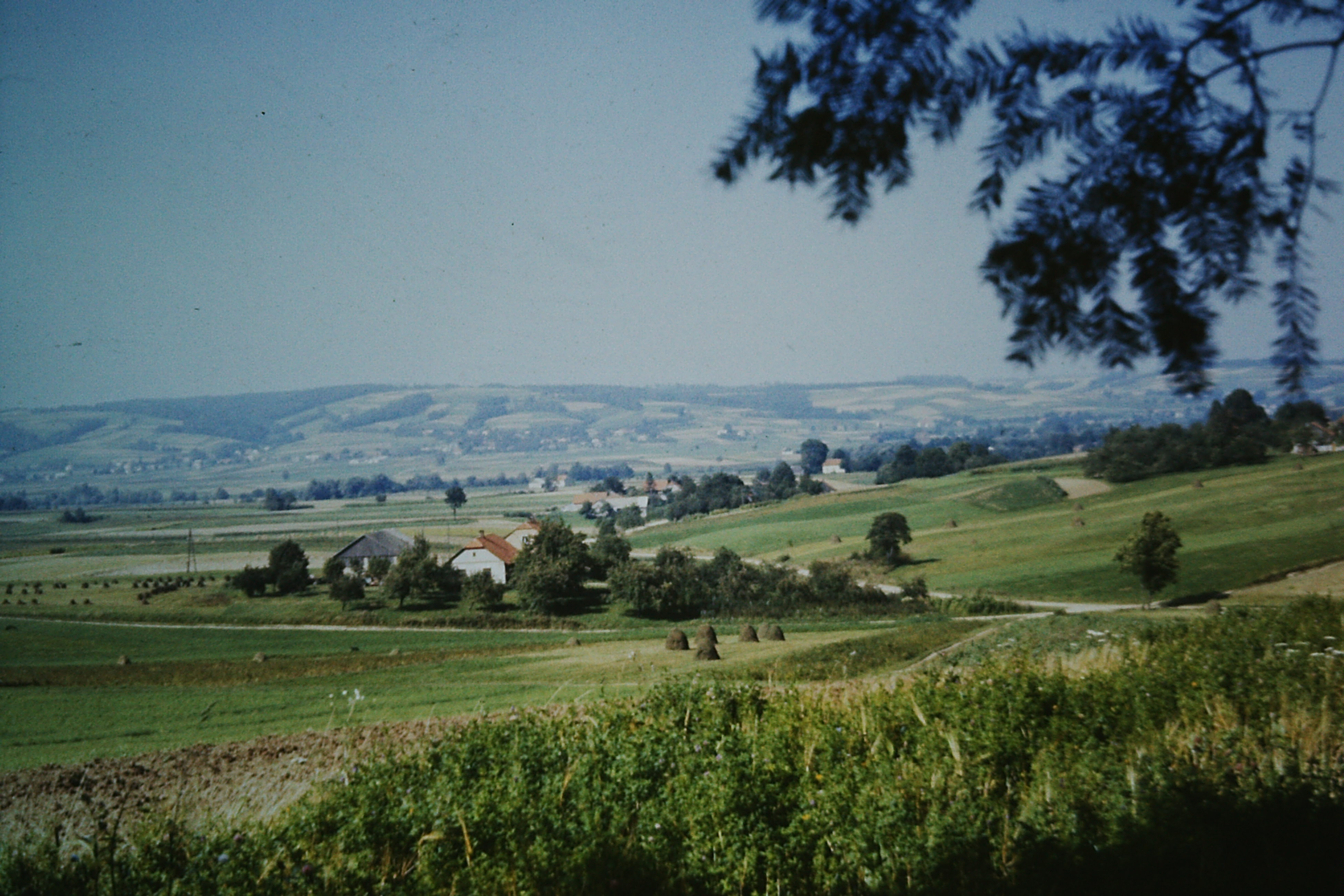

- Location within Poland
- Coordinates: 50°18′N 18°33′E
- Country: Poland
- Voivodeship: Silesian
- County: Gliwice
- Gmina: Sośnicowice
- Population: 1,024

Kozłów [ˈkɔzwuf] is a village in the administrative district of Gmina Sośnicowice, within Gliwice County, Silesian Voivodeship, in southern Poland.
