= Smolnica, Silesian Voivodeship =

Smolnica
- Village
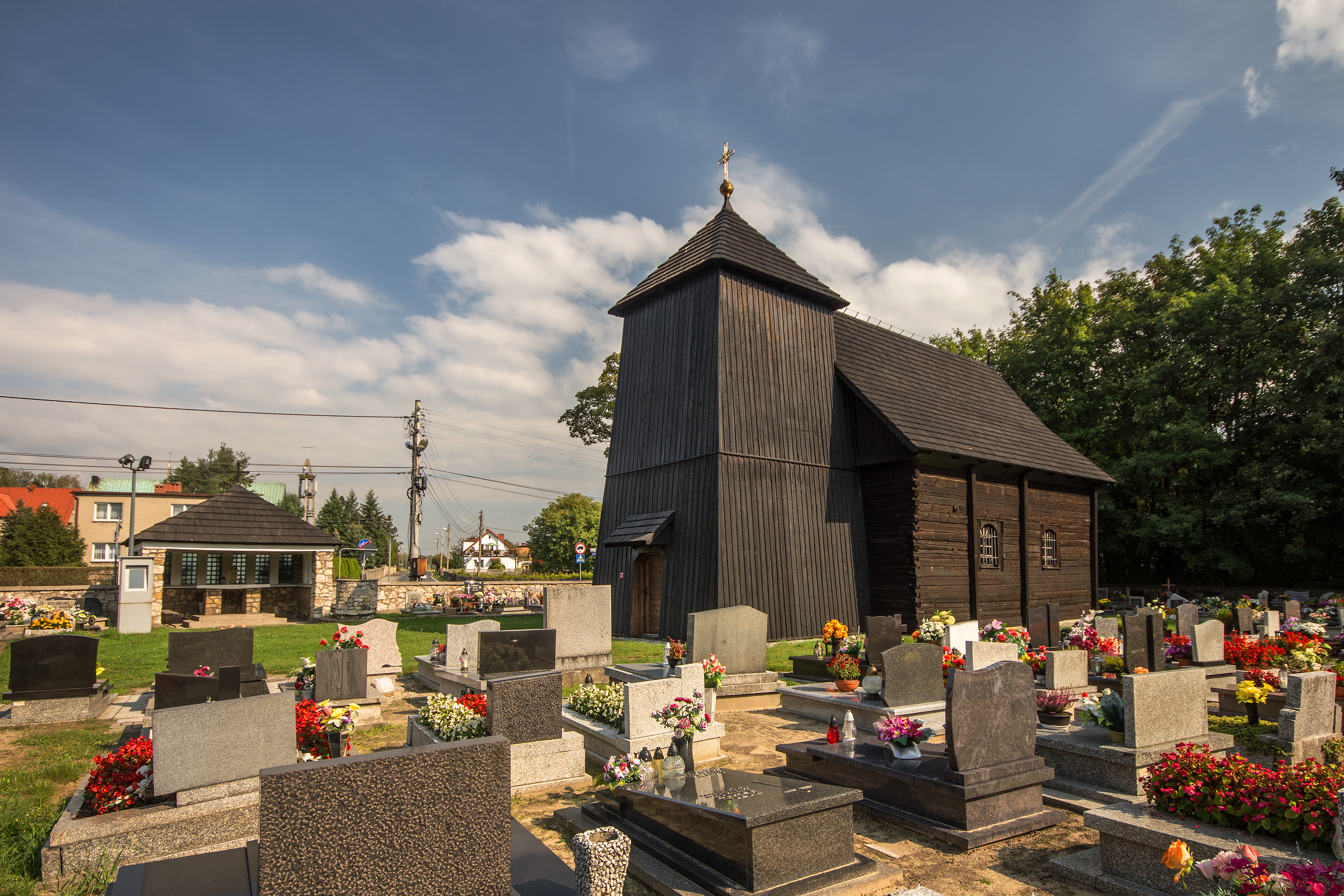
- Church of Saint Bartholomew

- Location within Poland
- Coordinates: 50°15′N 18°33′E
- Country: Poland
- Voivodeship: Silesian
- County: Gliwice
- Gmina: Sośnicowice

Population
  - Total: 1,089

Smolnica [smɔlˈnit͡sa] is a village in the administrative district of Gmina Sośnicowice, within Gliwice County, Silesian Voivodeship, in southern Poland.
