= Zamoście, Silesian Voivodeship =

Zamoście
- Village
- Location within Poland
- Coordinates: 50°14′39″N 18°30′12″E
- Country: Poland
- Voivodeship: Silesian
- County: Gliwice
- Gmina: Sośnicowice

Zamoście (Polish pronunciation: [zaˈmɔɕt͡ɕɛ]) is a village in the administrative district of Gmina Sośnicowice, within Gliwice County, Silesian Voivodeship, in southern Poland.
