= Rakszawa =

- Village
- Location within Poland
- Coordinates: 50°9′N 22°15′E
- Country: Poland
- Voivodeship: Subcarpathian
- County: Łańcut
- Gmina: Rakszawa
- Population: 6,100
- Website: http://www.rakszawa.itl.pl

Rakszawa [rakˈʂava] is a village in Łańcut County, Subcarpathian Voivodeship, in south-eastern Poland. It is the seat of the gmina (administrative district) called Gmina Rakszawa.
