= Nowa Wieś, Gliwice County =

Nowa Wieś
- Village
- Location within Poland
- Coordinates: 50°14′6″N 18°29′46″E
- Country: Poland
- Voivodeship: Silesian
- County: Gliwice
- Gmina: Sośnicowice

Nowa Wieś [ˈnɔva ˈvjɛɕ] is a village in the administrative district of Gmina Sośnicowice, within Gliwice County, Silesian Voivodeship, in southern Poland.
