= Sierakowice, Silesian Voivodeship =

Sierakowice
- Village
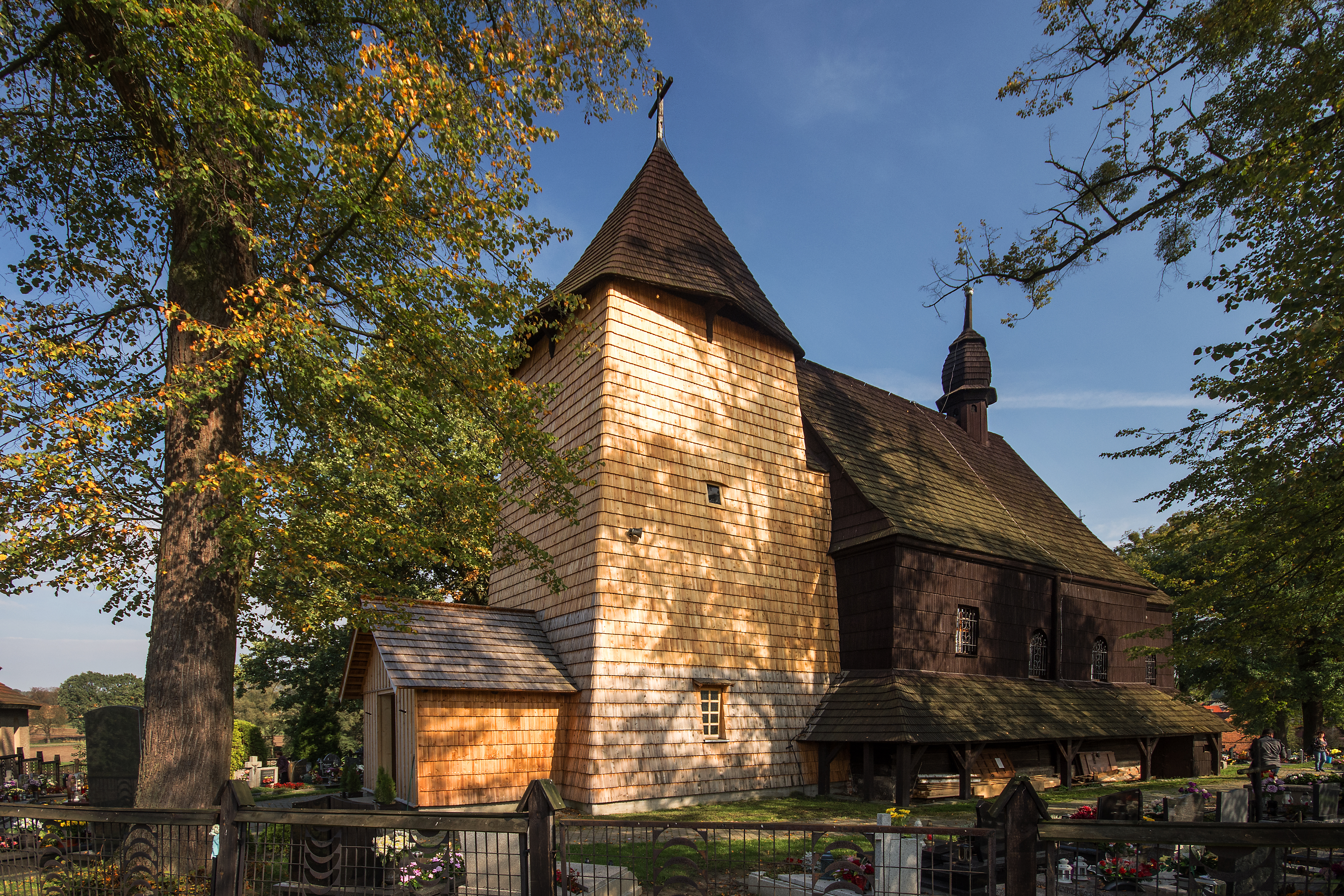
- Church of Saint Catherine of Alexandria

- Location within Poland
- Coordinates: 50°16′N 18°28′E
- Country: Poland
- Voivodeship: Silesian
- County: Gliwice
- Gmina: Sośnicowice

Population
  - Total: 1,157

Sierakowice [ɕɛrakɔˈvit͡sɛ] is a village in the administrative district of Gmina Sośnicowice, within Gliwice County, Silesian Voivodeship, in southern Poland.
