= Żołynia =

- Village
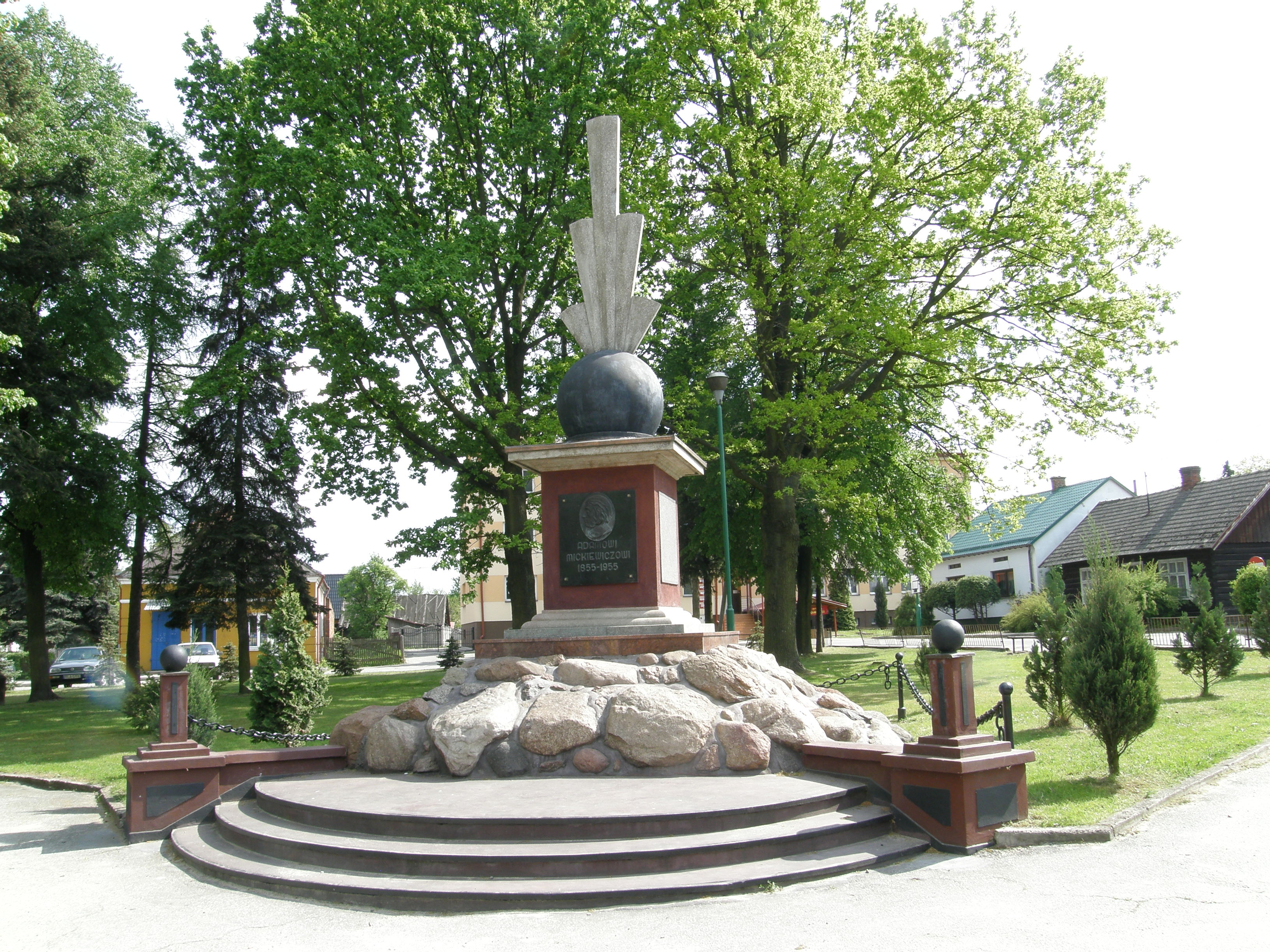
- Adam Mickiewicz Monument

- Location within Poland
- Coordinates: 50°10′43″N 22°19′27″E
- Country: Poland
- Voivodeship: Subcarpathian
- County: Łańcut
- Gmina: Żołynia
- Population: 5,106
- Website: http://www.zolynia.pl/

Żołynia [ʐɔˈwɨɲa] is a village in Łańcut County, Subcarpathian Voivodeship, in south-eastern Poland. It is the seat of the gmina (administrative district) called Gmina Żołynia.

== Notable people ==
- Sergiusz Zając (born 1998), Polish professional mixed martial artist
