= Gajówka, Gliwice County =

Gajówka
- Village
- Location within Poland
- Coordinates: 50°15′53″N 18°25′44″E
- Country: Poland
- Voivodeship: Silesian
- County: Gliwice
- Gmina: Sośnicowice

Gajówka [ɡaˈjufka] is a village in the administrative district of Gmina Sośnicowice, within Gliwice County, Silesian Voivodeship, in southern Poland.
