= Gmina Czarna, Łańcut County =

Gmina Czarna Czarna Commune
- Gmina
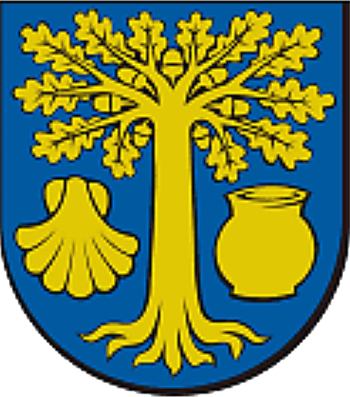
- Coat of arms
- Interactive map of Gmina Czarna
- Coordinates (Czarna): 50°7′N 22°11′E
- Country: Poland
- Voivodeship: Subcarpathian
- County: Łańcut
- Seat: Czarna

Area
  - Total: 78.11 km^{2} (30.16 sq mi)

Population (2011)
  - Total: 11,177
  - Density: 143.1/km^{2} (370.6/sq mi)
- Website: www.gminaczarna.pl

Gmina Czarna is a rural gmina (administrative district) in Łańcut County, Subcarpathian Voivodeship, in south-eastern Poland. Its seat is the village of Czarna, which lies approximately 7 kilometres (4 mi) north-west of Łańcut and 16 km (10 mi) north-east of the regional capital Rzeszów.

The gmina covers an area of 78.11 square kilometres (30.2 sq mi), and as of 2006 its total population is 10,779 (11,177 in 2011).

== Villages ==
Gmina Czarna contains the villages and settlements of Czarna, Dąbrówki, Krzemienica, Medynia Głogowska, Medynia Łańcucka, Pogwizdów, Wola Mała and Zalesie.

== Neighbouring gminas ==
Gmina Czarna is bordered by the town of Łańcut and by the gminas of Białobrzegi, Krasne, Łańcut, Rakszawa, Sokołów Małopolski, Trzebownisko and Żołynia.
