= Łańcut County =

Łańcut County Powiat łańcucki
- County
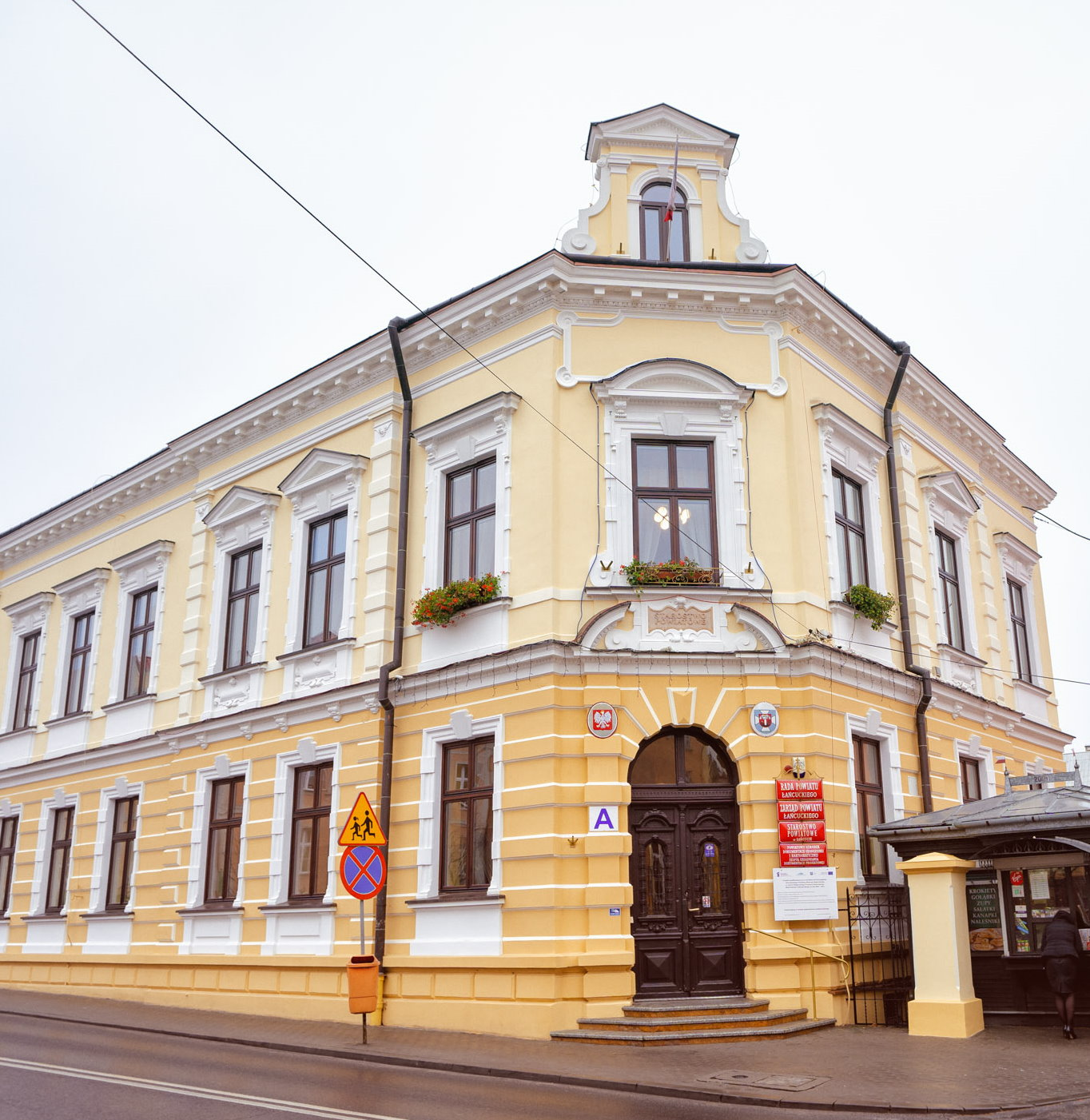
- Starostwo

- Flag Coat of arms

- Location within the voivodeship
- Coordinates (Łańcut): 50°4′N 22°14′E
- Country: Poland
- Voivodeship: Subcarpathian
- Seat: Łańcut
- Gminas: Total 7 (incl. 1 urban): Łańcut; Gmina Białobrzegi; Gmina Czarna; Gmina Łańcut; Gmina Markowa; Gmina Rakszawa; Gmina Żołynia

Government
  - Starosta: Adam Krzysztoń

Area
  - Total: 452 km^{2} (175 sq mi)

Population (2019)
  - Total: 80,898
  - Density: 179/km^{2} (464/sq mi)
  - Urban: 17,709
  - Rural: 63,189
- Car plates: RLA
- Website: www.powiatlancut.pl

Łańcut County (Polish: powiat łańcucki) is a unit of territorial administration and local government (powiat) in Subcarpathian Voivodeship, south-eastern Poland. It came into being on January 1, 1999, as a result of the Polish local government reforms passed in 1998. Its administrative seat and only town is Łańcut, site of the famous Łańcut Castle, lying 17 kilometres (11 mi) east of the regional capital Rzeszów.

The county covers an area of 452 square kilometres (174.5 sq mi). As of 2019 its total population was 80,898, out of which 22% in urban areas.

== Neighbouring counties ==
Łańcut County is bordered by Leżajsk County to the north, Przeworsk County to the east, and Rzeszów County to the west.

== Administrative divisions ==
The county is subdivided into seven gminas (one urban and six rural). These are listed in the following table, in descending order of population.

Gmina	Type	Area (km^{2})	Population (2019)	Seat
Gmina Łańcut	rural	107	21,852	Łańcut
Łańcut	urban	19	17,709	Łańcut
Gmina Czarna	rural	78	11,812	Czarna
Gmina Białobrzegi	rural	56	8,684	Białobrzegi
Gmina Rakszawa	rural	66	7,345	Rakszawa
Gmina Żołynia	rural	57	7,009	Żołynia
Gmina Markowa	rural	69	6,487	Markowa
* seat not part of the gmina

== Places of interest ==
- Markowa Ulma-Family Museum of Poles Who Saved Jews in World War II, the first museum in Poland, dedicated to the rescue of Jewish population in occupied Poland during World War II. Opened in March 2016, the Ulma Family Museum of Poles Saving Jews in World War II was designed by Mirosław Nizio, known for his modern design of architectural objects and interiors.
- Łańcut Castle Museum, located in one of the most beautiful aristocratic residences in Poland, the Łańcut castle. The castle, along with pavilions and farm buildings is surrounded by historic and picturesque English park. The complex is of great historic importance for Polish and European cultural heritage.
- Pottery Centre in Medynia Głogowska, shows the pottery tradition of te region. It is located in a beautiful 19th-century wooden building. Shows, workshops and lectures are organised here. There is also an exposition of pottery and clay sculptures from the early 20th century. The pottery fair is organised every year in July.
- Łańcut synagogue, built in 1761 is one of the most spectacular synagogues preserved in Central Europe. The temple was financed by Stanisław Lubomirski, the leading protector of Jews in Łańcut. The synangoue is located on the Chassidic Route linking 30 towns in Eastern Poland with the most valuable monuments of Jewish culture in south-eastern Poland.
- Orthodox art in the Łańcut castle (located in the eastern wing of the stable), the biggest collection of Ukrainian Orthodox art in Poland. The collection not only includes icons, but also flags, processional crosses, books, textiles and liturgical vessels.

== Twin towns ==
Łańcut County is twinned with: "News (in Polish)"

- Jászapáti, Hungary
- Saarpfalz-KreisGermany
- Stryi Raion, Ukraine

== Gallery ==
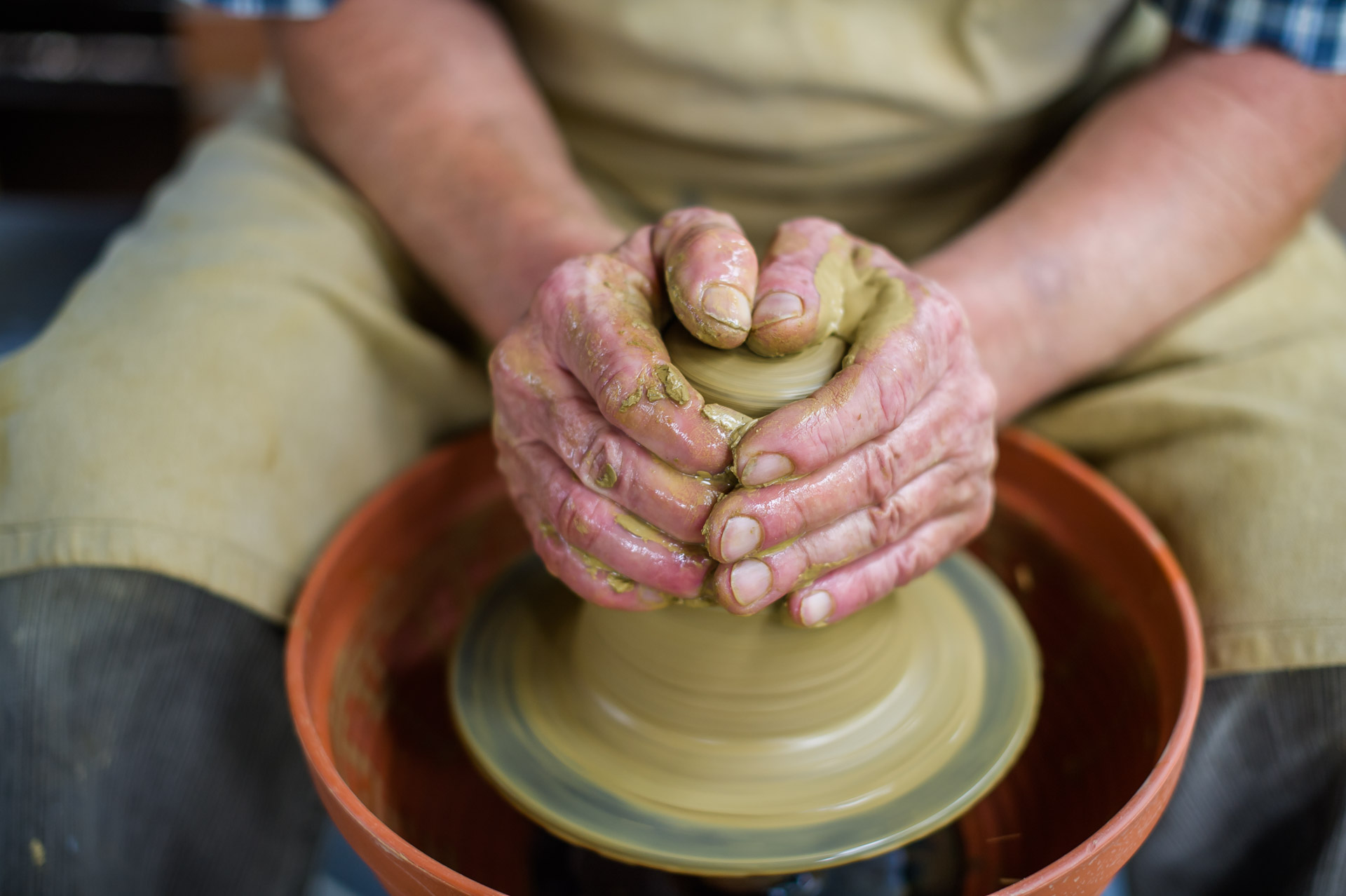
Pottery Centre in Medynia Głogowska

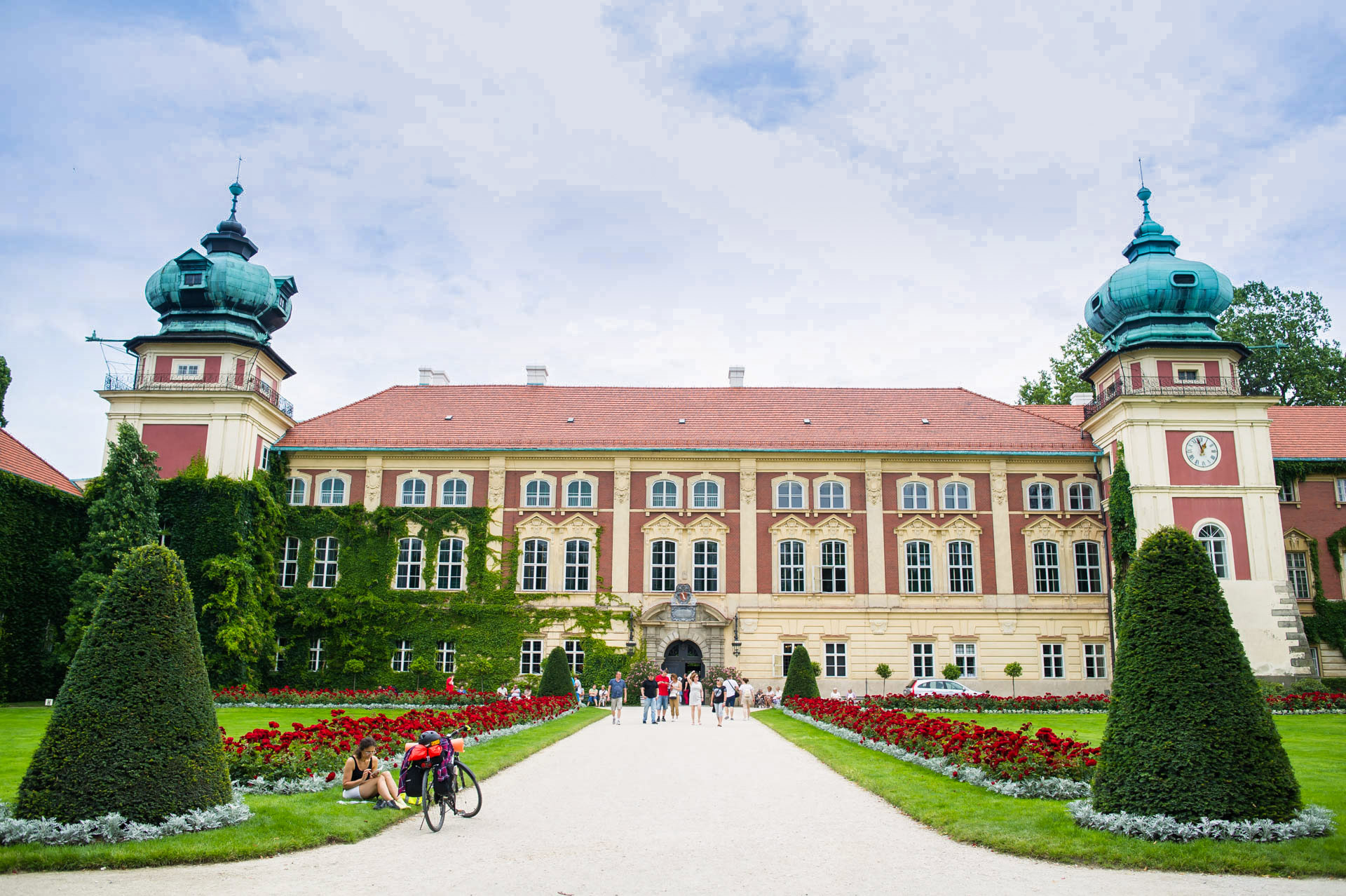
Łańcut Castle

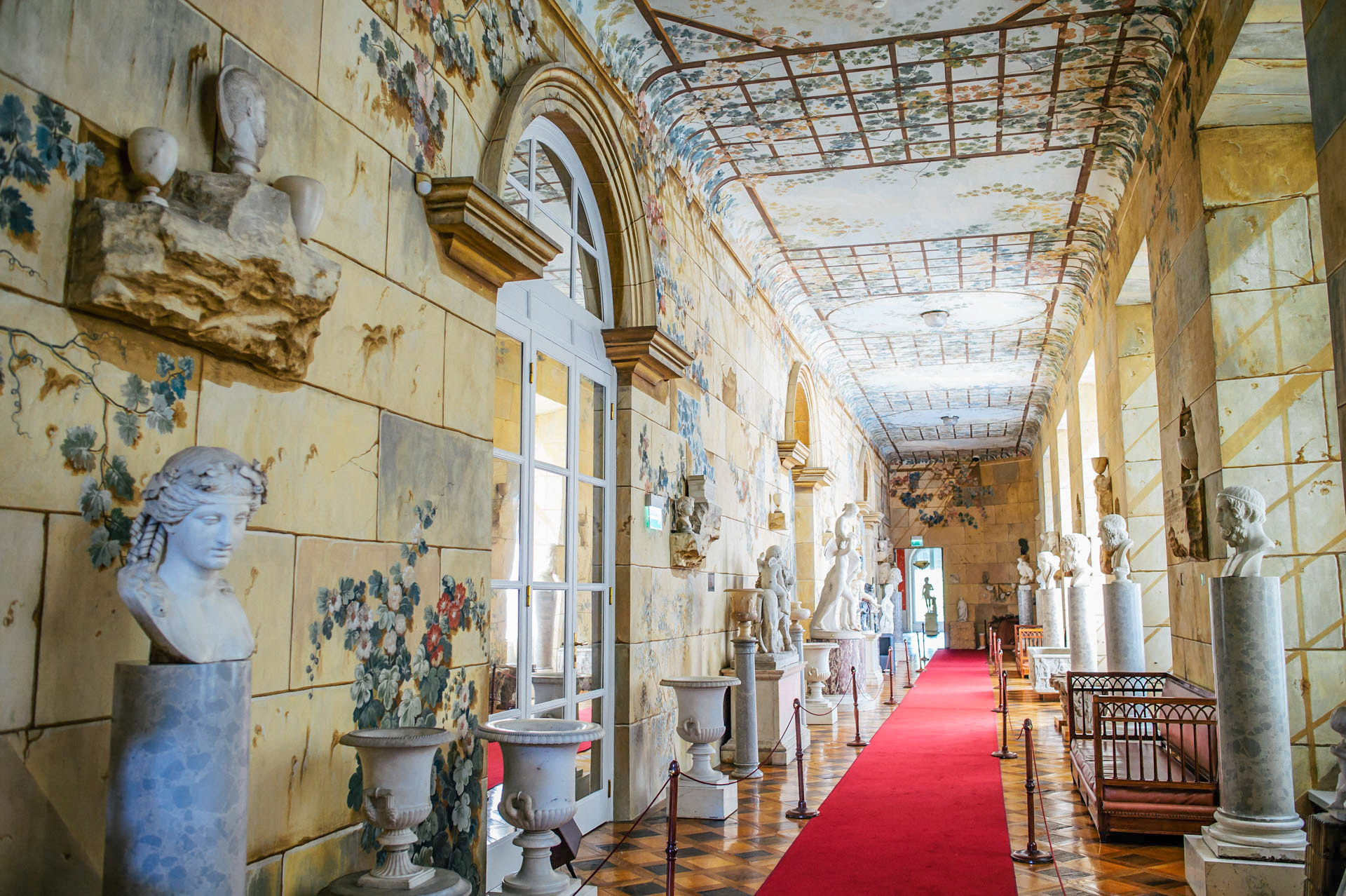
Łańcut Castle Museum

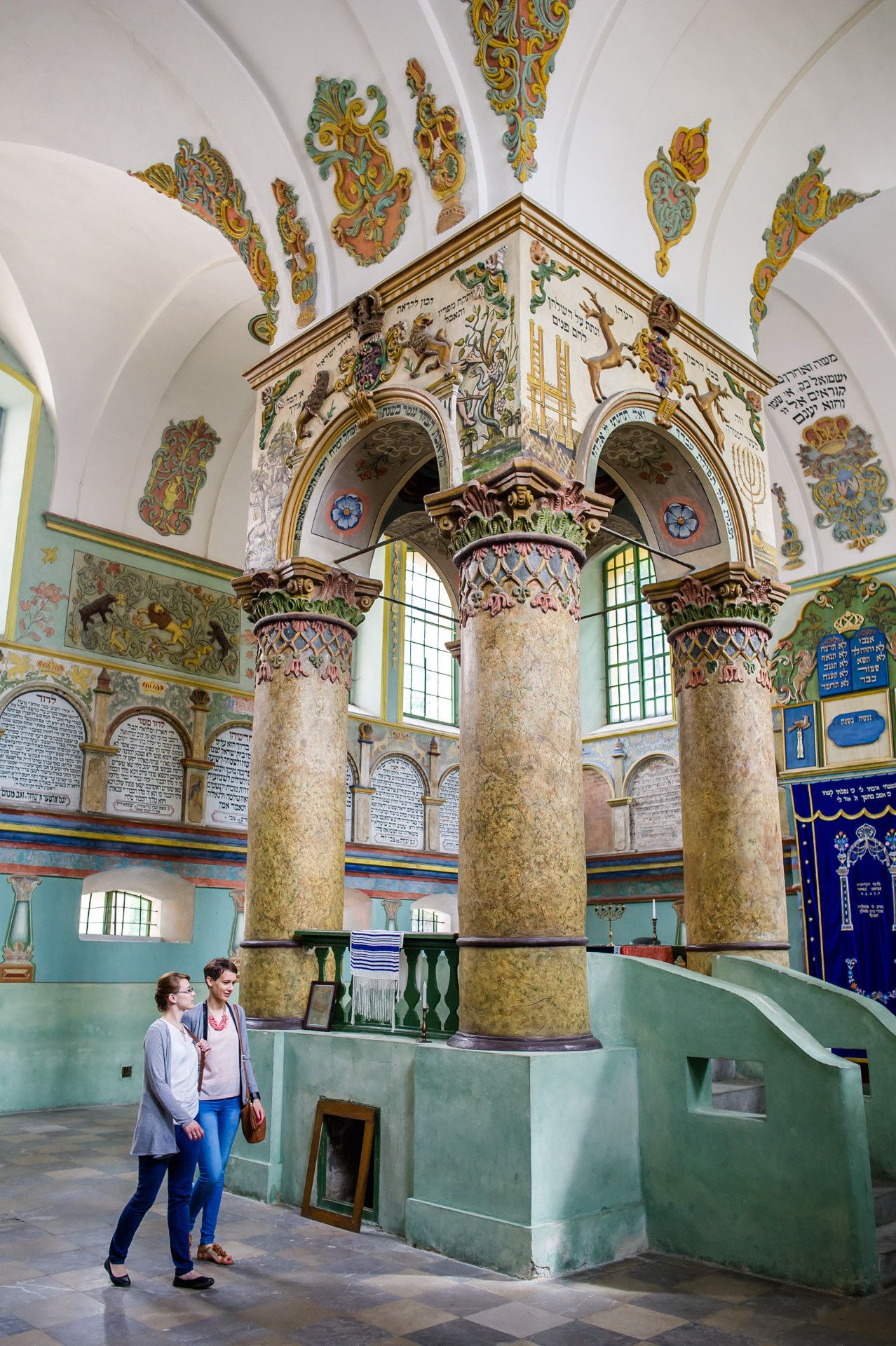
Łańcut Synagogue
