= Leżajsk (disambiguation) =

Leżajsk is a town in Podkarpackie Voivodeship, Poland.

Leżajsk may also refer to:

- Leżajsk County, unit of territorial administration in Podkarpackie Voivodeship
- Gmina Leżajsk, administrative districts in Poland
- Leżajsk Brewery, brewery belonging to the Żywiec Group
- Leżajsk Transmitter, 130 metre guyed steel mast belonging to the INFO-TV-OPERATOR company
