= Molynie =

Settlement in southeastern Poland

Molynie (Mołynie) is an outlying settlement of Piskorowice in the administrative district of Gmina Leżajsk, within Leżajsk County, Podkarpackie Voivodeship, in south-eastern Poland. It lies approximately 8 kilometres (5 mi) south-east of Leżajsk and 43 km (27 mi) north-east of the regional capital Rzeszów. It was the site of part of the Piskorowice massacre which occurred in 1945.
