= Brzóza Królewska =

- Village
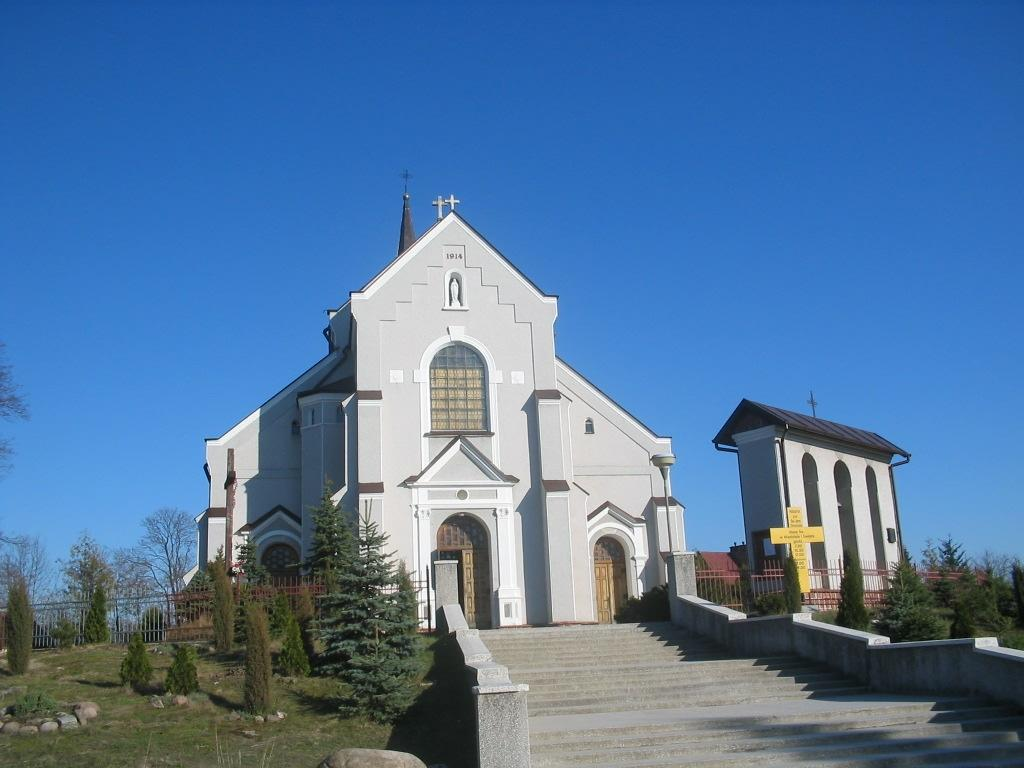
- Church in Brzóza Królewska (built 1914)

- Location within Poland
- Coordinates: 50°15′N 22°20′E
- Country: Poland
- Voivodeship: Subcarpathian
- County: Leżajsk
- Gmina: Leżajsk
- First mentioned: 1565
- Highest elevation: 214 m (702 ft)
- Lowest elevation: 184 m (604 ft)

Population
  - Total: 3,200
- Time zone: UTC+1 (CET)
  - Summer (DST): UTC+2 (CEST)
- Vehicle registration: RLE

Brzóza Królewska ([ˈbʐuza kruˈlɛfska]; literally "Royal Birch"; Ukrainian: Бере́за Королі́вська) is a village in the administrative district of Gmina Leżajsk, within Leżajsk County, Subcarpathian Voivodeship, in south-eastern Poland. In 2006 the village had a population of 3,200.

Brzóza Królewska is divided into the following parts: Podbór, Stępnie, Bednarze, Kmiecie, Zagrody, Łoiny, Flisy, Piaski, Podsośnina, Chiny.

== History ==
Brzóza Królewska was first mentioned in 1565. Its current location was not inhabited then and was only a hunting area known as over the birch (za brzozą). It was first settled in the mid-17th century.

The area was originally a temporary shelter against Tatars raids for the people of Giedlarowa. Life was not easy for early inhabitants as the soil was not fertile. It was difficult to earn a living and have sufficient food provisions. However, over time, the population of Brzóza increased as a result of wolnizna (settlers did not have to pay rent for land in the beginning) granted to inhabitants by the starost from Leżajsk - Łukasz Opaliński.

After the First Partition of Poland Brzóza Królewska was a part of the Austrian Empire. At the end of the 18th century, there were approximately 1,500 inhabitants. In 1830, a Roman Catholic parish was created (earlier Brzóza Królewska was under supervision of Giedlarowa parish). In 1914, the original wooden church was rebuilt in brick temple. Following World War I, in 1918, Poland regained independence and control of the village.

Following the joint German-Soviet invasion of Poland, which started World War II in September 1939, the village was occupied by Germany. In 1942–1943, the German gendarmerie and Gestapo carried out a massacre of 62 hiding and captured Jews (men, women and children) and 3 Poles (two men and one woman) for sheltering these Jews.

== Overview ==
The village is located between forests which are remains of the "Sandomierska Wilderness". It was included in the "Brzóźniański Obszar Chronionego Krajobrazu" (nature preserve) formed in 1992 (which contains an area of 118 square kilometres - of which 75% are woods). It is the most precious site there, and is especially known for its peat bog reserve called Suchy Ług. A water reservoir was created where Tartaczny stream connects with Tarlaka river. It is mainly used for firefighting purposes but is also a well-known tourist attraction.

There are many beaver lodges on Tarlaka river. The beaver activity in this area has created many ponds and backwaters, making the landscape suitable for many rare birds and other forms of wildlife. Other sites worth seeing include the former Potocki Park, which has larch alleys. In the same place, a memorial shrine was consecrated in 1923 for Dear Dziula, from Stecki's family. There is also a memorial stone with the epitaphy In memory of Adam Zamojski, for eternity Alfred Potocki and Jerzy Potocki, 1933.

Brzóza Królewska is typical agricultural village with some tourism. There are such educational posts like: kindergarten, elementary school and gymnasium. There is also a bakery and tourist resort. A large number of its inhabitants work in nearby Leżajsk.

As a cultural enterprise: Brzozoki - folk band, was created and brass band which is part of Voluntary Fire Service.

== Sports ==
There is also football and cycling club: Azalia.

== Gallery ==
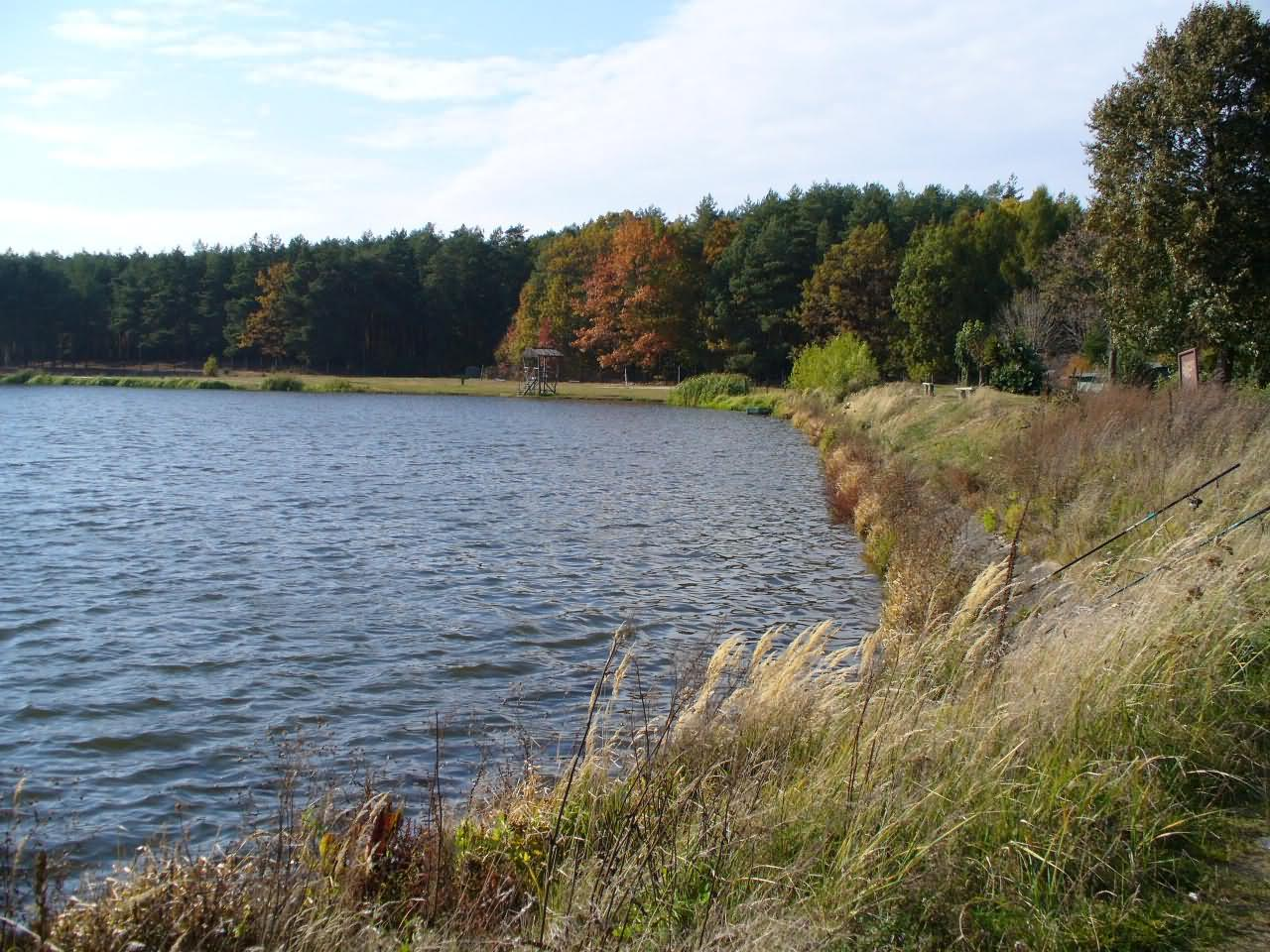
Water reservoir in Brzóza Królewska

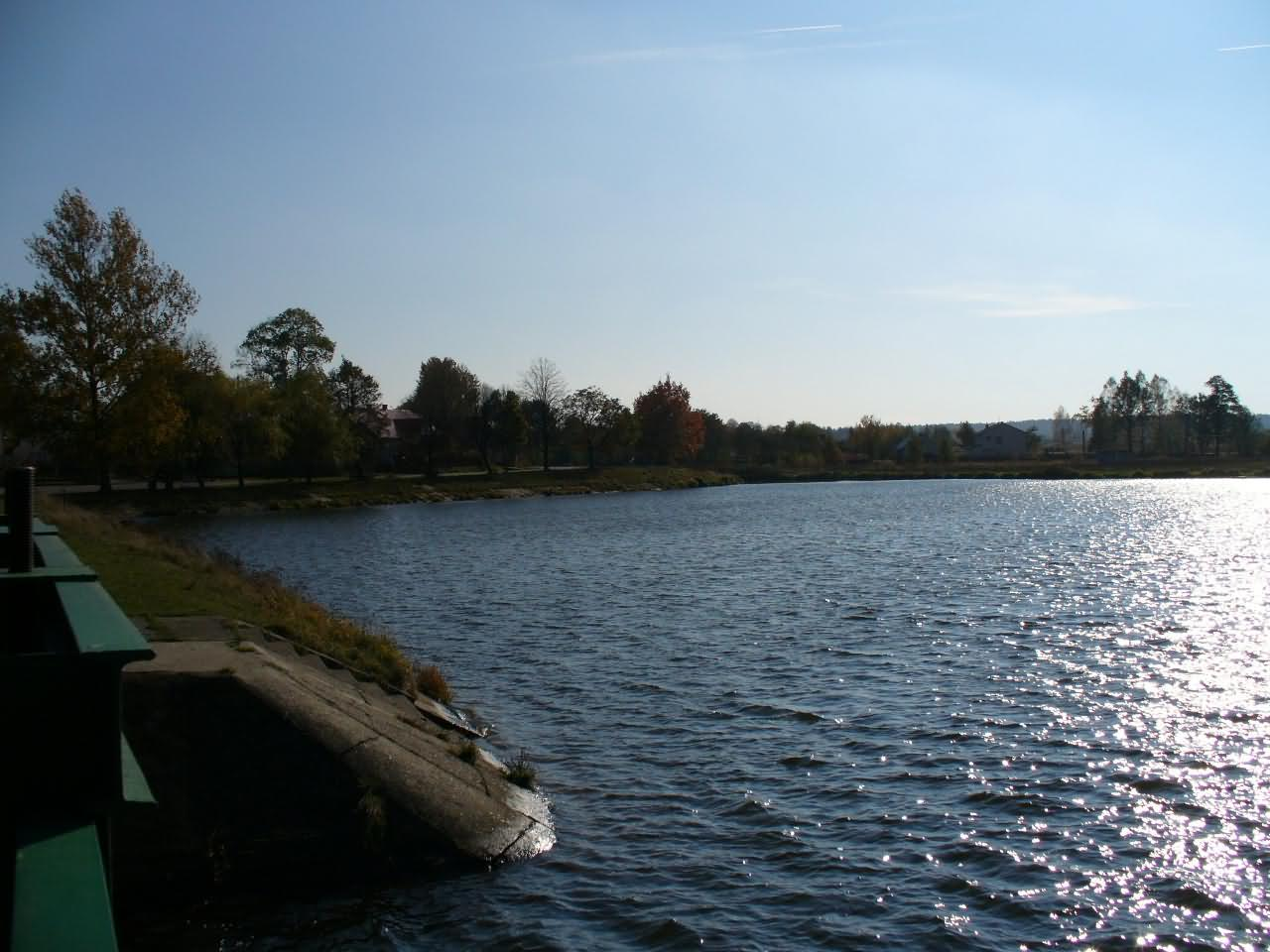
Water reservoir in Brzóza Królewska

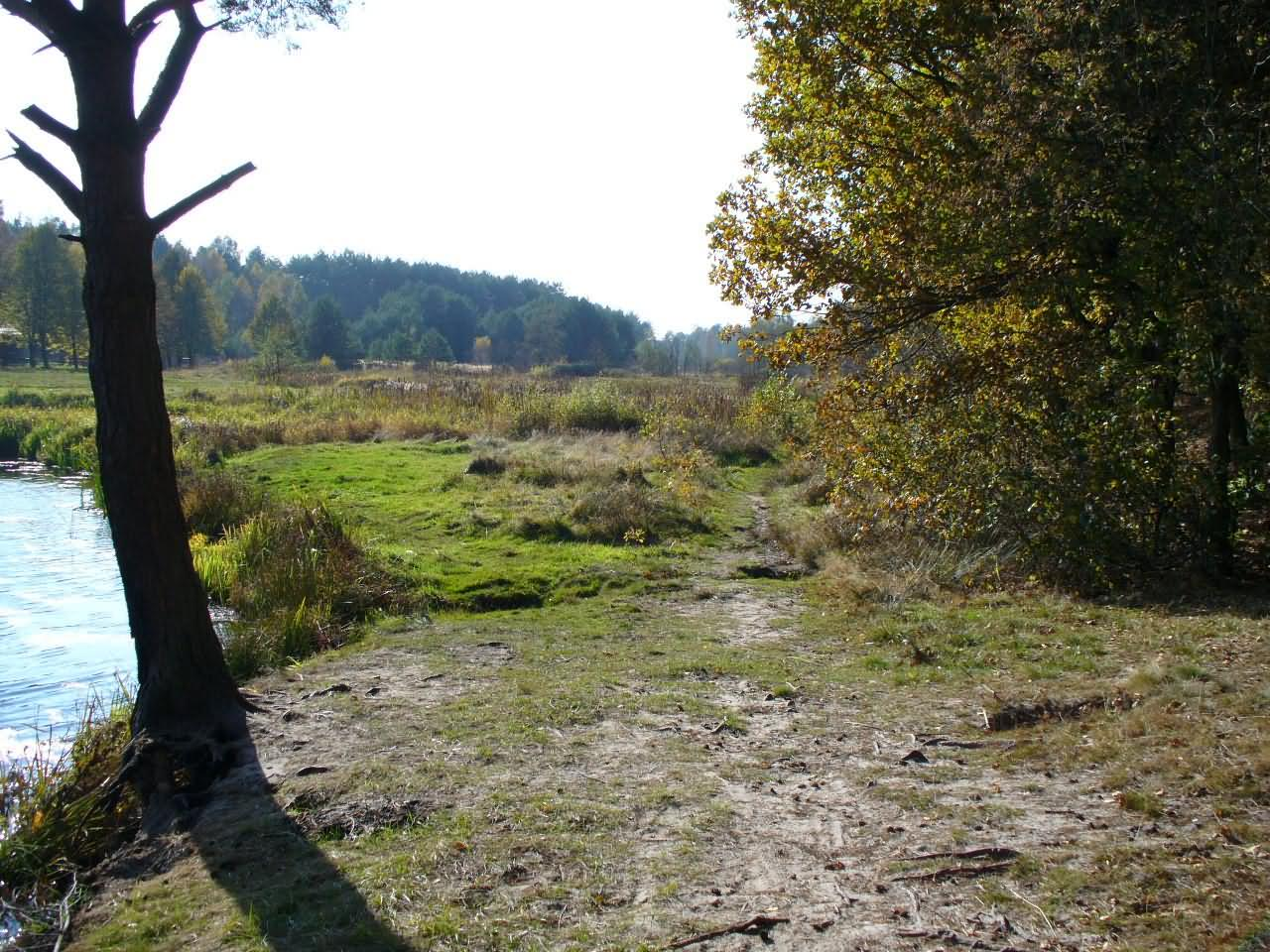
Backwaters in Brzóza

== Maps ==
- Satellite map
- Brzóza Królewska Map
