= Leżajsk Transmitter =

- Interactive map of the Leżajsk Transmitter area

General information
- Status: Completed
- Type: Mast
- Location: Giedlarowa, Subcarpathian Voivodeship

Height
- Height: 127 m (416.67 ft)

Giedlarowa Transmitter
- Coordinates: 50°14′54″N 22°24′18″E

Leżajsk transmitter is a 127-metre guyed steel mast, localisation of the Giedlarowa village near by Leżajsk. The object belongs to the INFO-TV-OPERATOR company.

== Transmitted programmes ==
=== Digital television MPEG-4 ===
Multiplex Number	Programme in Multiplex	Frequency	Channel	Power ERP	Polarisation	Antenna Diagram	Modulation
MUX 1	TVP1; Stopklatka TV; TVP ABC; TV Trwam; Eska TV; TTV; Polo TV; ATM Rozrywka	650 MHz	43	100 kW	Horizontal	ND	64 QAM
MUX 2	Polsat; TVN; TV4; TV Puls; TVN 7; Puls 2; TV6; Polsat Sport News	778 MHz	59	100 kW	Horizontal	ND	64 QAM
MUX 3	TVP1 HD; TVP2 HD; TVP Rzeszów; TVP Kultura; TVP Historia; TVP Polonia; TVP Rozrywka; TVP Info	514 MHz	26	70 kW	Horizontal	ND	64 QAM

== FM radio ==
Radio
Program	Frequency	ERP
Radio ZET	95,00 MHz	20 kW
Polskie Radio Program I	96,80 MHz	10 kW
Polskie Radio Program III	98,90 MHz	10 kW
RMF FM	101,80 MHz	60 kW
Polskie Radio Rzeszów	102,90 MHz	30 kW
Radio Maryja	106,30 MHz	20 kW

== See also ==
- List of masts
- List of tallest structures in Poland
