= Novoiavorivsk =

City in Lviv Oblast, Ukraine

Novoiavorivsk Новояворівськ
- City
- Town central square with Palace of Culture and monument to Taras Shevchenko in front

- Flag Coat of arms

- Location within Lviv Oblast Location within Ukraine
- Coordinates: 49°55′52″N 23°34′23″E
- Country: Ukraine
- Oblast: Lviv Oblast
- Raion: Yavoriv Raion
- Hromada: Novoiavorivsk urban hromada
- Founded: 1965

Area
  - Total: 203 km^{2} (78 sq mi)
- Elevation: 300 m (980 ft)

Population (2022)
  - Total: 31,366
  - Density: 155/km^{2} (400/sq mi)
- Time zone: UTC+2 (EET)
  - Summer (DST): UTC+3 (EEST)
- Postal code: 81053, 81054
- Area code: +380-3256
- Website: novmiskrada.com

Novoiavorivsk (Ukrainian: Новояворівськ, IPA: [nowoˈjɑwor⁽ʲ⁾iu̯sʲk]; Polish: Nowojaworowsk), alternatively transliterated Novoyavorivsk, is a city in the Yavoriv Raion, Lviv Oblast of Ukraine. Novoiavorivsk hosts the administration of Novoiavorivsk urban hromada, one of the hromadas of Ukraine. Its population is 31,366 (2022 estimate).

The name of the town translates to "New Yavoriv".

== History ==
The town is about 45 minute trip from the oblast's administrative centre Lviv (30 km (19 mi)). The town is located on a major road, which ends at the border of Poland as the E40 and continues to Lviv. The town was founded in 1965 as a workers' settlement called Yantarne (Ukrainian: Янтарне). In 1969 it was renamed to Novoiavorivsk.

In 1984, a town club was built here. In 1985, a new well-maintained school for 1,568 students was built here. City since 1986. In January 1989 the population was 24 320 people. The largest enterprise was a plant of reinforced concrete structures.

In 2008, by a resolution of the Verkhovna Rada of Ukraine, Novoiavorivske was renamed to the city of Novoiavorivsk. On September 23, 2008, the Verkhovna Rada of Ukraine adopted Resolution No. 578-VI, which included 757.2 hectares of land under the jurisdiction of the Novoiavorivsk City Council within the city limits and approved the total area of the city of 974.9 hectares. New city boundaries were established.

Novoiavorivsk's city center contains a large square with the town's "Palace of Culture" building and the town's church. The town also contains a football field. In the town based Hockey Club Levy. Novoiavorivsk is twinned with Leżajsk, Poland.

== Transport ==
A railway station is located here, it is called Jantarne Train Station. It has one or two regional trains per day.

== Notable people ==
- Vasyl Pryima — Ukrainian footballer
- Nazariy Rusyn — Ukrainian footballer

== Sport ==
The town is home to ice hockey club HC Levy.

== Gallery ==
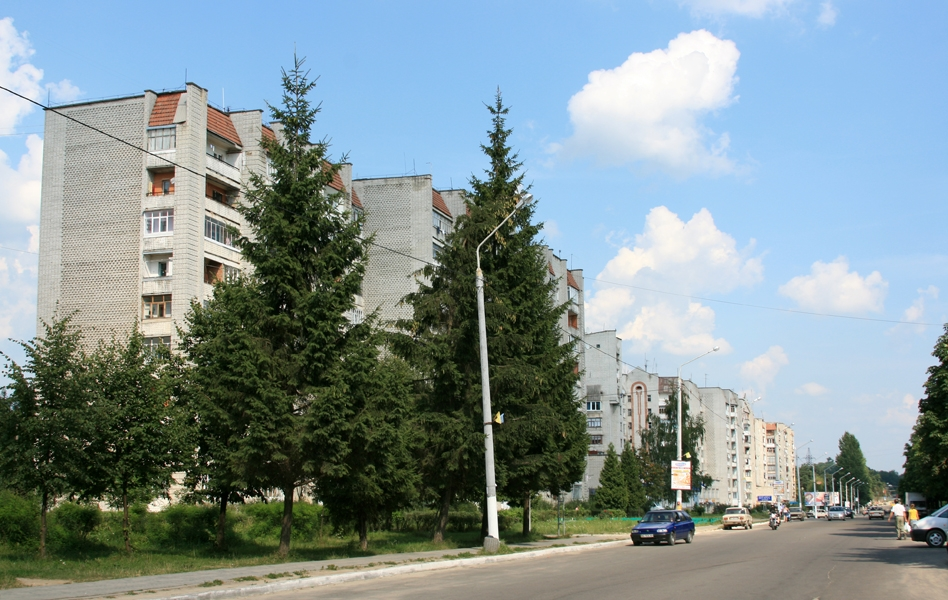
Stepana Bandery street (2008) - main street in Novoiavorivsk

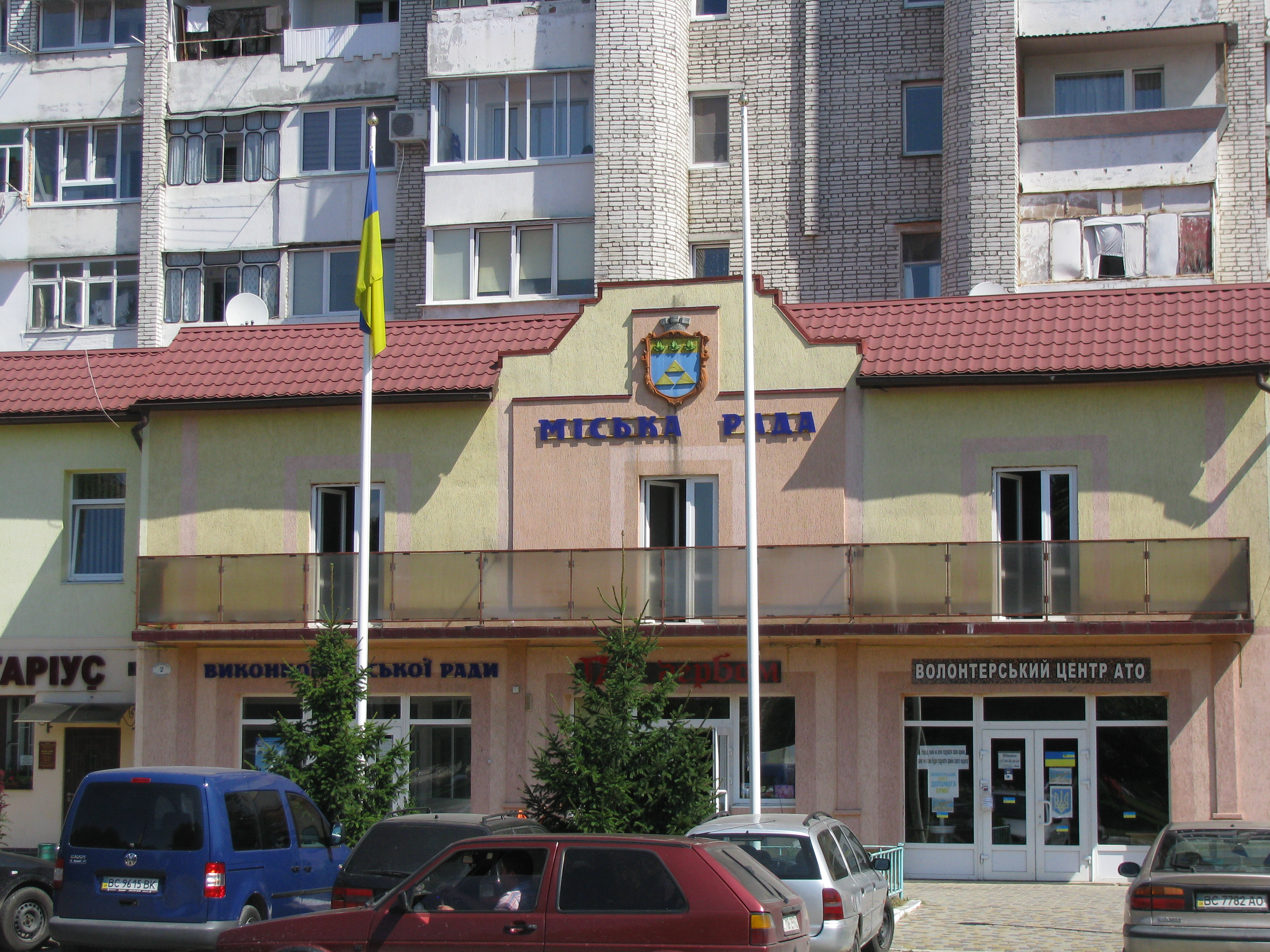
City Council (2016)

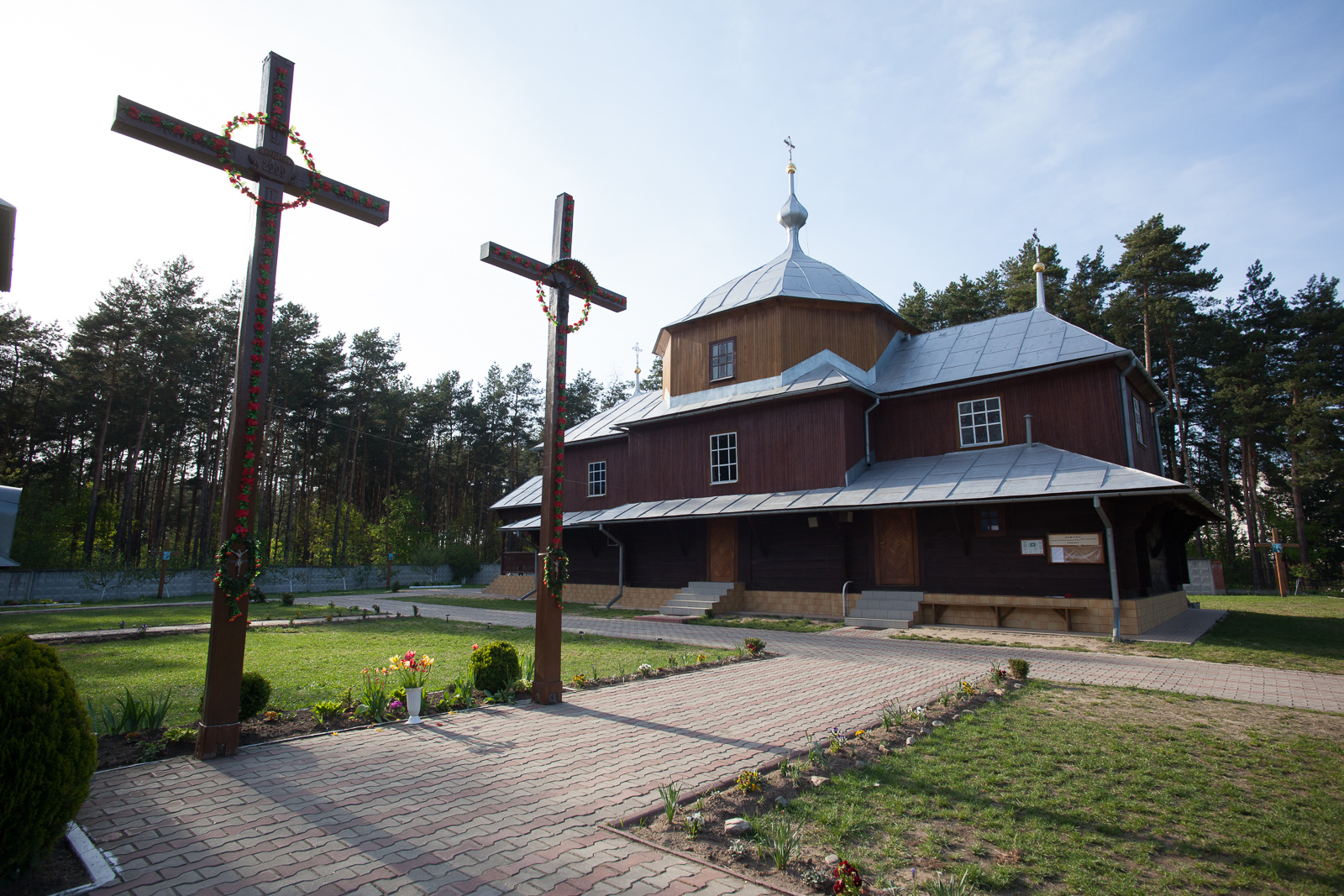
Saint George church

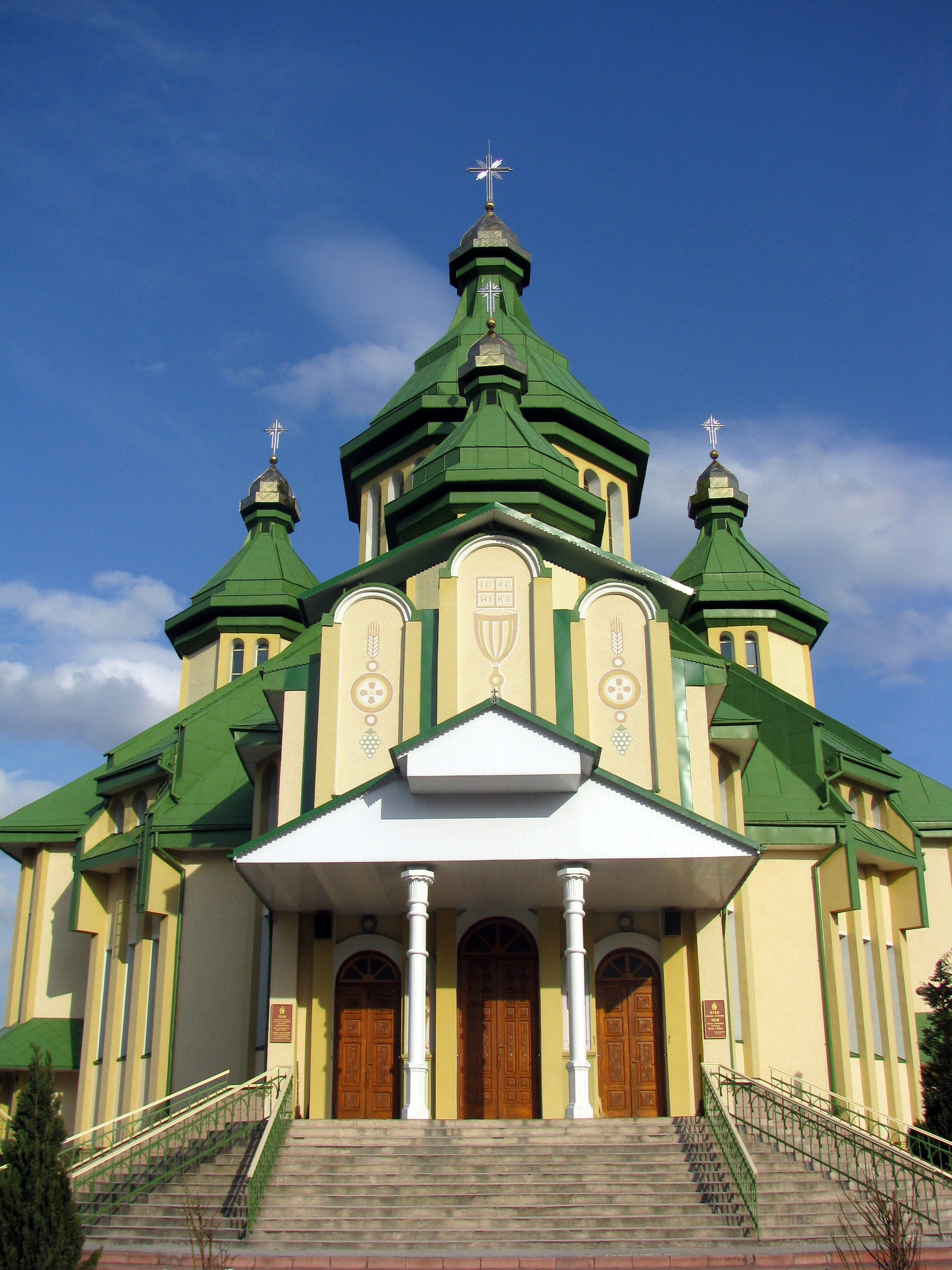
St. Peter and Paul Church (2009)

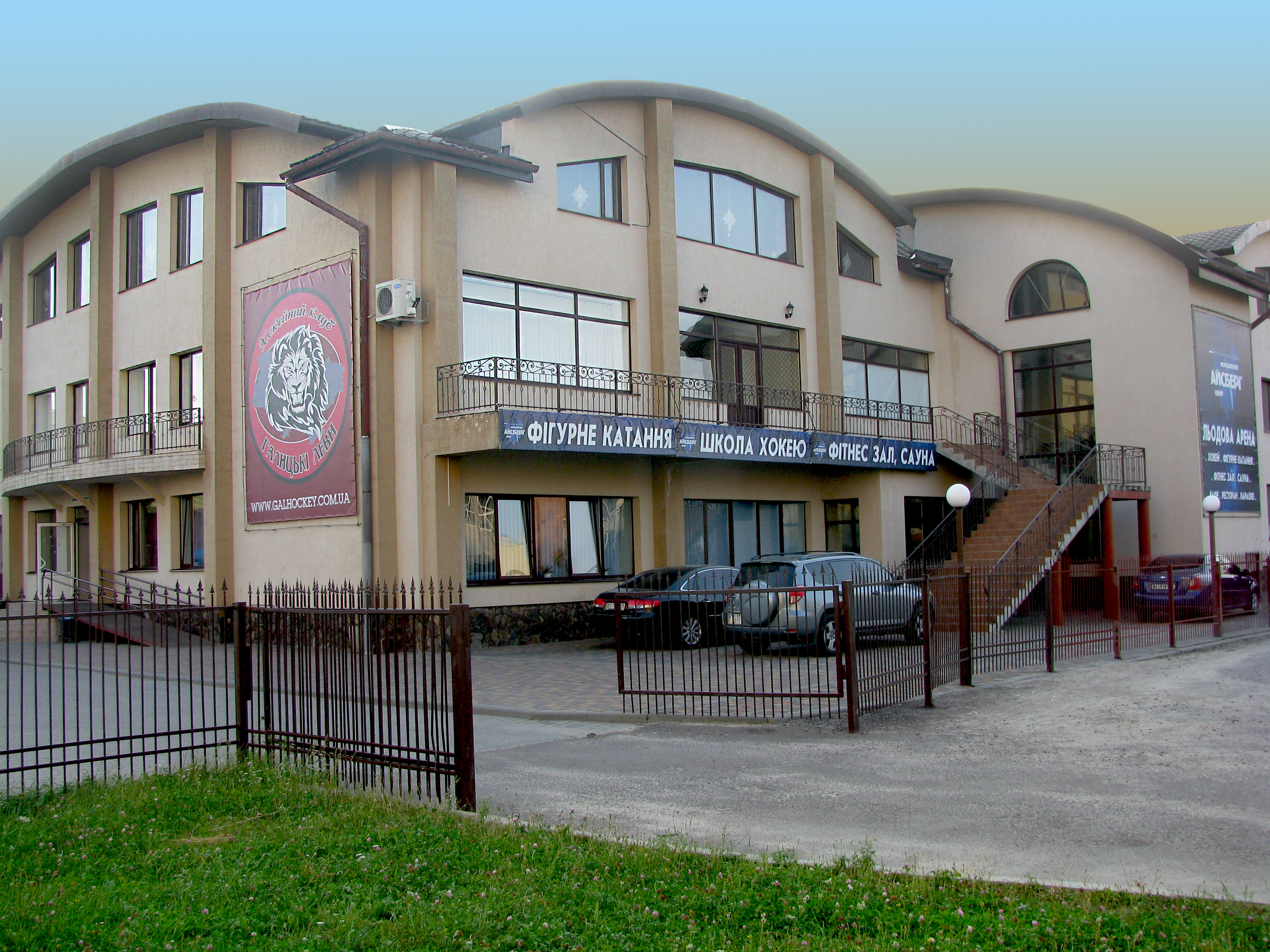
Ice hockey venues (2016)
