= Gmina Leżajsk =

Gmina Leżajsk Leżajsk Commune
- Gmina
- Flag Coat of arms
- Interactive map of Gmina Leżajsk
- Coordinates (Leżajsk): 50°16′N 22°26′E
- Country: Poland
- Voivodeship: Subcarpathian
- County: Leżajsk
- Seat: Leżajsk

Area
  - Total: 198.5 km^{2} (76.6 sq mi)

Population (2024)
  - Total: 19,795
  - Density: 99.72/km^{2} (258.3/sq mi)
- Website: https://samorzad.gov.pl/web/gmina-lezajsk

Gmina Leżajsk is a rural gmina (administrative district) in Leżajsk County, Subcarpathian Voivodeship, in south-eastern Poland. Its seat is the town of Leżajsk, although the town is not part of the territory of the gmina.

The gmina covers an area of 198.5 square kilometres (76.6 sq mi). In 2006 its total population was 19,832, 20,051 in 2011, and 19,795 in 2024.

== Villages ==
Gmina Leżajsk contains the villages and settlements of Biedaczów, Brzóza Królewska, Chałupki Dębniańskie, Dębno, Giedlarowa, Gwizdów, Hucisko, Maleniska, Piskorowice, Przychojec, Rzuchów, Stare Miasto and Wierzawice.

== Neighbouring gminas ==
Gmina Leżajsk is bordered by the town of Leżajsk and by the gminas of Adamówka, Grodzisko Dolne, Krzeszów, Kuryłówka, Nowa Sarzyna, Rakszawa, Sieniawa, Sokołów Małopolski, Tryńcza and Żołynia.

== Notable people ==
- Rabbi Elimelech Weisblum (1717–1787), one of the Hasidic movement's founding Rebbes.
- Count Jan Potocki (1761–1815), captain, engineer of the Crown Army, ethnologist, Egyptologist, linguist, and author.
- Tadeusz Hollender (1910–1943), Polish poet, translator, humorist and member of the Polish resistance movement in World War II, murdered by the Gestapo
- Boguslaw Szwacz (1912–2009), artist and teacher
- Tadeusz Lubicz-Niezabitowski (1896–1952), colonel who served in the Polish Armed Forces and took part in the Battle of Grudziądz
- Józef Zych (1938–), lawyer, politician, and former Marshal of the Sejm.

== See also ==
- Leżajsk
- Leżajsk County
