= Hucisko, Leżajsk County =

Hucisko
- Village
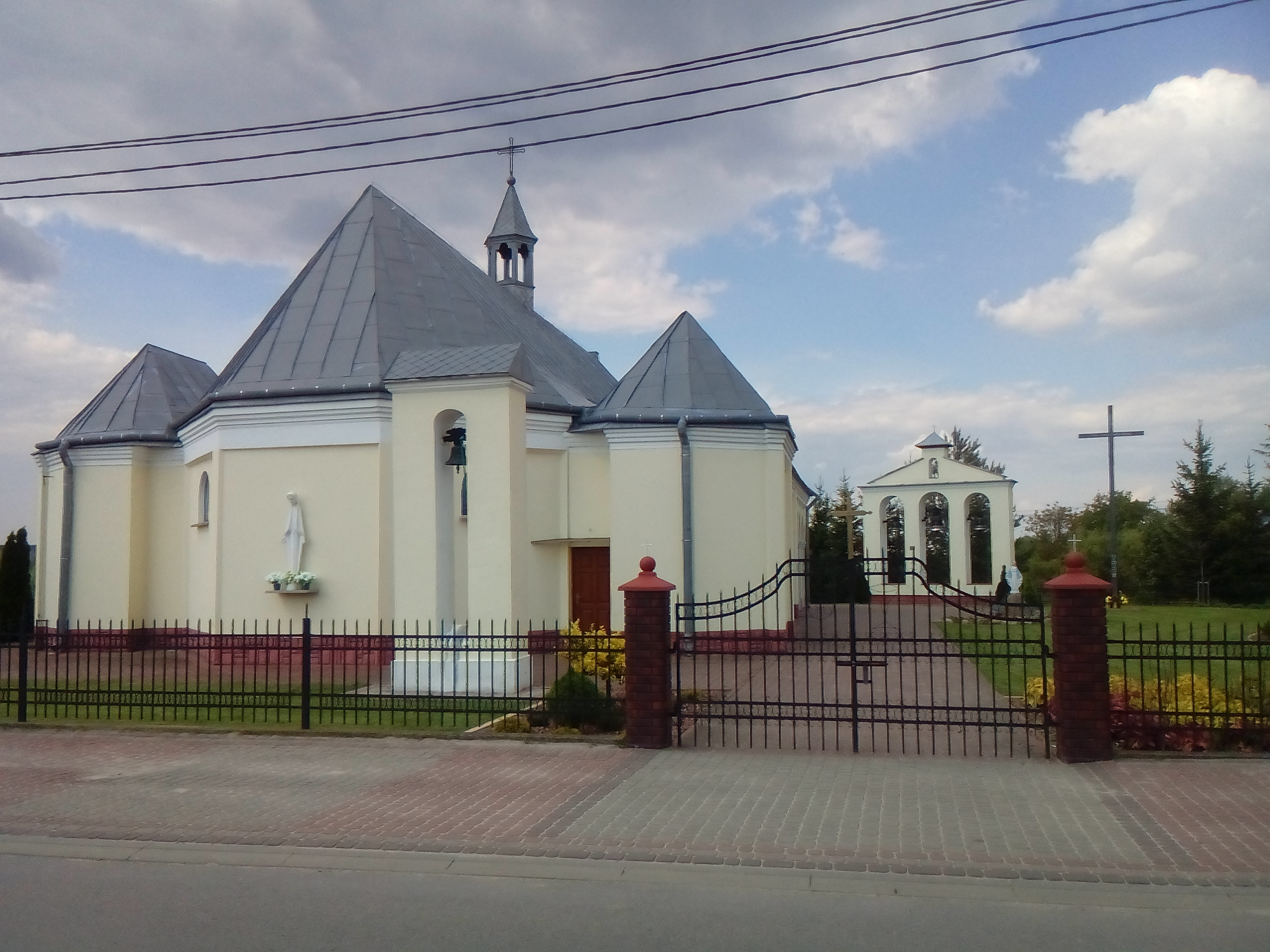
- The affiliate church of St. John of Dukla in Hucisko

- Location within Poland
- Coordinates: 50°16′N 22°17′E
- Country: Poland
- Voivodeship: Subcarpathian
- County: Leżajsk
- Gmina: Leżajsk
- Time zone: UTC+1 (CET)
  - Summer (DST): UTC+2 (CEST)
- Vehicle registration: RLE

Hucisko [xuˈt͡ɕiskɔ] is a village in the administrative district of Gmina Leżajsk, within Leżajsk County, Subcarpathian Voivodeship, in south-eastern Poland.
