= Stare Miasto, Podkarpackie Voivodeship =

Stare Miasto
- Village
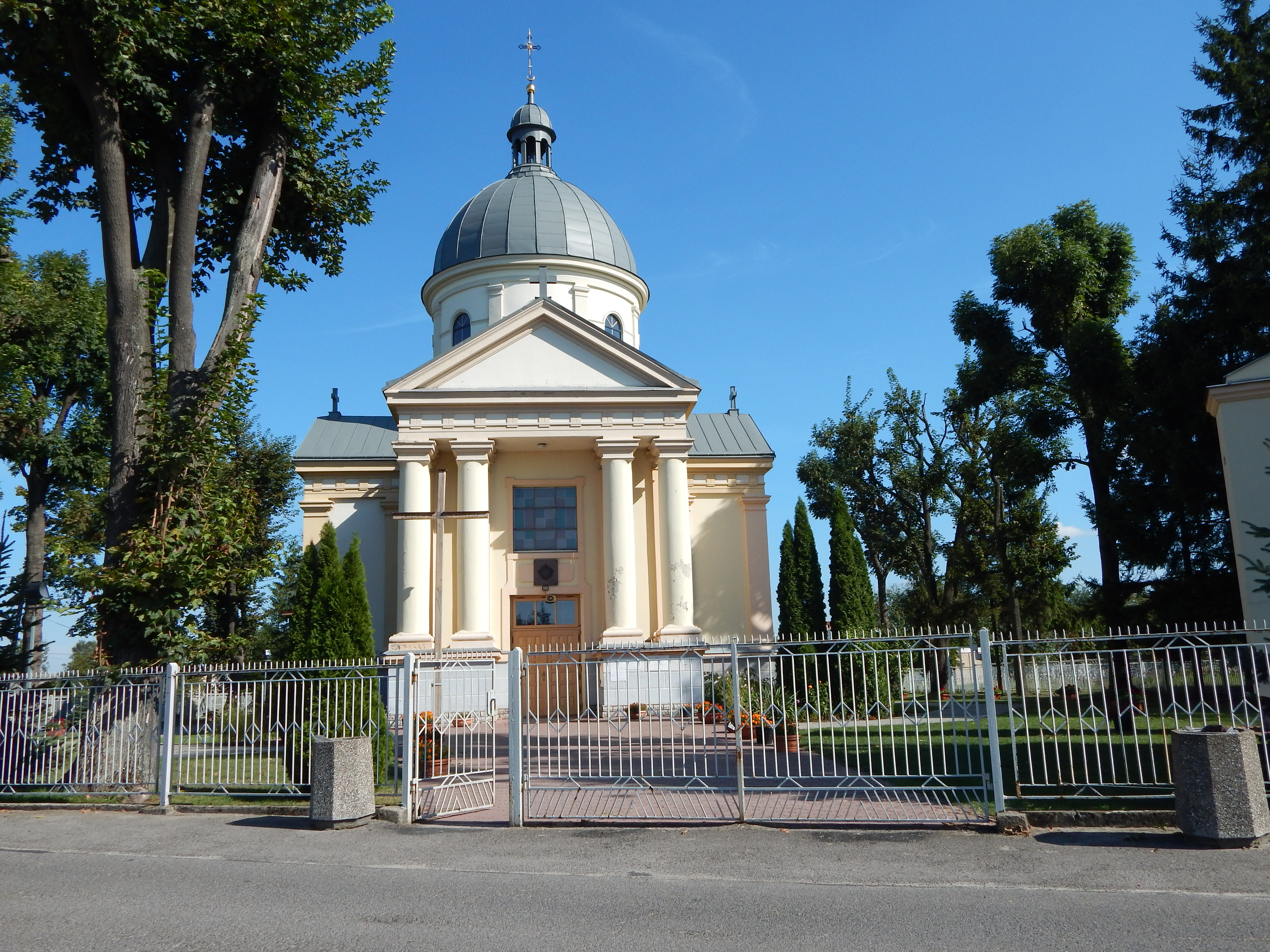
- Saint Andrew Bobola church in Stare Miasto

- Location within Poland
- Coordinates: 50°17′N 22°25′E
- Country: Poland
- Voivodeship: Subcarpathian
- County: Leżajsk
- Gmina: Leżajsk
- Time zone: UTC+1 (CET)
  - Summer (DST): UTC+2 (CEST)
- Vehicle registration: RLE

Stare Miasto (Polish: [ˈstarɛ ˈmjastɔ]) is a village in the administrative district of Gmina Leżajsk, within Leżajsk County, Subcarpathian Voivodeship, in south-eastern Poland.

It was the former location of the nearby town of Leżajsk, which was eventually moved to its present location in 1524 by Polish King Sigismund I the Old. Afterwards, as Stare Miasto ("Old Town") it was a royal village of the Polish Crown.
