= Berdykhiv =

Rural locality in Lviv Oblast, Ukraine

Berdykhiv Бердихів
- Village
- Location within Lviv Oblast Location within Ukraine
- Coordinates: 49°53′07″N 23°31′41″E
- Country: Ukraine
- Oblast: Lviv Oblast
- Raion: Yavoriv Raion
- Established: 1598

Area
  - Total: 1,023 km^{2} (395 sq mi)
- Elevation /(average value of): 244 m (801 ft)

Population
  - Total: 680
  - Density: 0.66/km^{2} (1.7/sq mi)
- Time zone: UTC+2 (EET)
  - Summer (DST): UTC+3 (EEST)
- Postal code: 81064
- Area code: +380 3259
- Website: село Бердихів, райцентр Яворів^{(Ukrainian)}

Berdykhiv (Ukrainian: Бердихів) is a village (selo) in the Lviv Oblast (province), Yavoriv Raion of Western Ukraine. It belongs to Novoiavorivsk urban hromada, one of the hromadas of Ukraine. Area of the village totals is 1,023 km^{2}. Local government is administered by Berdykhivska village council.

== Geography ==
The village is situated at an altitude of 244 metres (800 ft) above sea level at a distance 6 kilometres (3.7 mi) from the Highway M10 (Ukraine) ( M 10). It is at a distance 43 kilometres (27 mi) from the regional center of Lviv, 18 kilometres (11 mi) from the district center Yavoriv and 32 kilometres (20 mi) from the Krakovets (a land border crossing between Ukraine and Poland - Korczowa-Krakovets).

== History and religion ==
The first written record of the village dates from 1598. But in these areas archaeologists found traces of a settlement an earlier epochs.
Residents of the village took part in the National War led by Bohdan Khmelnytsky.
In 1786 there was a poor harvest throughout Galicia and the winter brought a great famine. In 1788 there were 10 occupied houses in Berdykhiv. In 1812 there were only 7 occupied houses in the village and the total population was 48. By 1820 there were 10 occupied houses again.
The German colonies/settlement of Berdikau and Mossberg were founded in 1783 in the village Berdykhiv (district of Jaworow in Galicia).
Now the population of the village is about 680 people. Church of St. Nicolas is in the village.

== Literature ==
- Історія міст і сіл УРСР : Львівська область, Яворівський район, Бердихів. – К. : ГРУРЕ, 1968 р. Page 925 (in Ukrainian)
