= Biedaczów =

- Village
- Location within Poland
- Coordinates: 50°12′N 22°21′E
- Country: Poland
- Voivodeship: Subcarpathian
- County: Leżajsk
- Gmina: Leżajsk

Population
  - Total: 718
- Time zone: UTC+1 (CET)
  - Summer (DST): UTC+2 (CEST)
- Vehicle registration: RLE

Biedaczów [bʲɛˈdat͡ʂuf] is a village in the administrative district of Gmina Leżajsk, within Leżajsk County, Subcarpathian Voivodeship, in south-eastern Poland.
