= Novoiavorivsk urban hromada =

Hromada in Lviv Oblast, Ukraine

Novoiavorivsk urban hromada Новояворівська міська громада
- Hromada
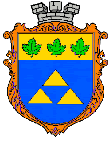
- Seal
- Interactive map of Novoiavorivsk urban hromada
- Country: Ukraine
- Oblast: Lviv Oblast
- Raion: Yavoriv Raion
- Admin. center: Novoiavorivsk

Area
  - Total: 2,734 km^{2} (1,056 sq mi)

Population (2021)
  - Total: 51,564
  - Density: 18.86/km^{2} (48.85/sq mi)
- CATOTTG code: UA46140050000054478
- Settlements: 22
- Cities: 1
- Rural settlements: 1
- Villages: 20
- Website: novmiskrada.gov.ua

Novoiavorivsk urban hromada (Ukrainian: Новояворівська міська громада) is a hromada in Ukraine, in Yavoriv Raion of Lviv Oblast. The administrative center is the city of Novoiavorivsk.

== Settlements ==
The hromada consists of 1 city (Novoiavorivsk), 1 rural settlement (Shklo) and 20 villages:

- Berdykhiv
- Volia-Dobrostanska
- Volia-Starytska
- Dobrostany
- Kamianobrid
- Kachmari
- Kertyniv
- Kohuty
- Lis
- Moloshkovychi
- Muzhylovychi
- Pidluby
- Prylbychi
- Rulevo
- Solyhy
- Stadnyky
- Starychi
- Steni
- Ternovytsia
- Cholhyni
