= Chałupki Dębniańskie =

- Village
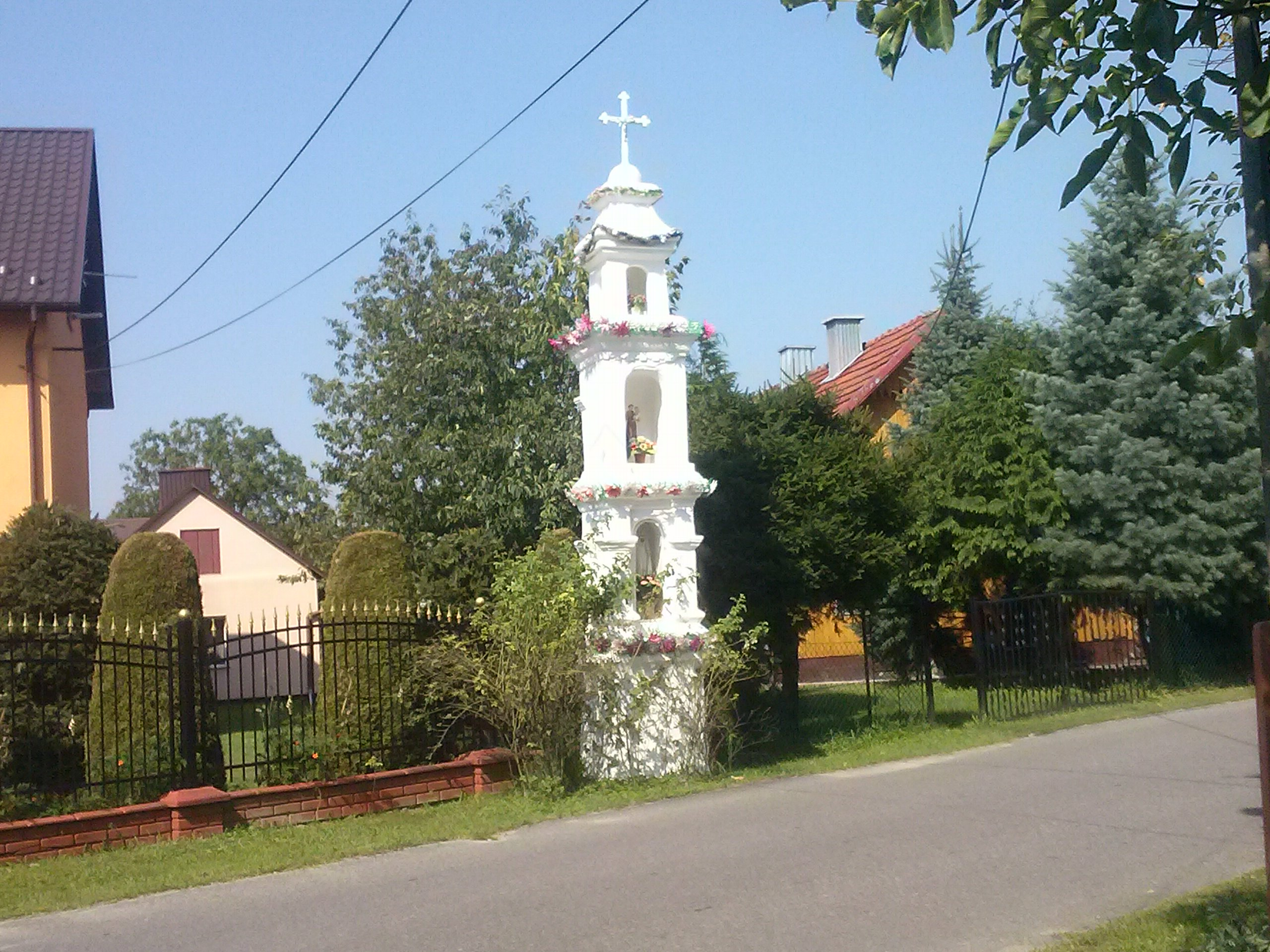
- Wayside shrine

- Location within Poland
- Coordinates: 50°10′N 22°30′E
- Country: Poland
- Voivodeship: Subcarpathian
- County: Leżajsk
- Gmina: Leżajsk
- Time zone: UTC+1 (CET)
  - Summer (DST): UTC+2 (CEST)
- Vehicle registration: RLE

Chałupki Dębniańskie [xaˈwupkʲi dɛmbˈɲaɲskʲɛ] is a village in the administrative district of Gmina Leżajsk, within Leżajsk County, Subcarpathian Voivodeship, in south-eastern Poland.

Four Polish citizens were murdered by Nazi Germany in the village during World War II.
