= Shklo =

Rural locality in Lviv Oblast, Ukraine

Shklo Шкло Szkło
- Rural settlement
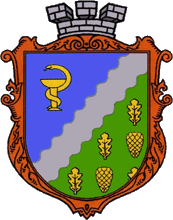
- Coat of arms

- Location in Lviv Oblast Location in Ukraine
- Coordinates: 49°57′01″N 23°31′33″E
- Country: Ukraine
- Oblast: Lviv Oblast
- Raion: Yavoriv Raion
- Hromada: Novoiavorivsk urban hromada
- Established: 1456

Area
  - Total: 1,263 km^{2} (488 sq mi)
- Elevation /(average value of): 258 m (846 ft)

Population (2022)
  - Total: 5,951
  - Density: 4.712/km^{2} (12.20/sq mi)
- Time zone: UTC+2 (EET)
  - Summer (DST): UTC+3 (EEST)
- Postal code: 81050
- Area code: +380 3259
- Website: смт Шкло ^{(Ukrainian)}

Shklo (Ukrainian: Шкло, Polish: Szkło) is a rural settlement in Yavoriv Raion, Lviv Oblast, in Western Ukraine. It belongs to Novoiavorivsk urban hromada, one of the hromadas of Ukraine. Population: 5,951 (2022 estimate).

Shklo is situated in the 42 kilometres (26 mi) from the regional center Lviv, 18 kilometres (11 mi) from the district center Yavoriv, and 34 kilometres (21 mi) from Krakovets.

Until 26 January 2024, Shklo was designated urban-type settlement. On this day, a new law entered into force which abolished this status, and Shklo became a rural settlement.

== Sanatorium treatment ==
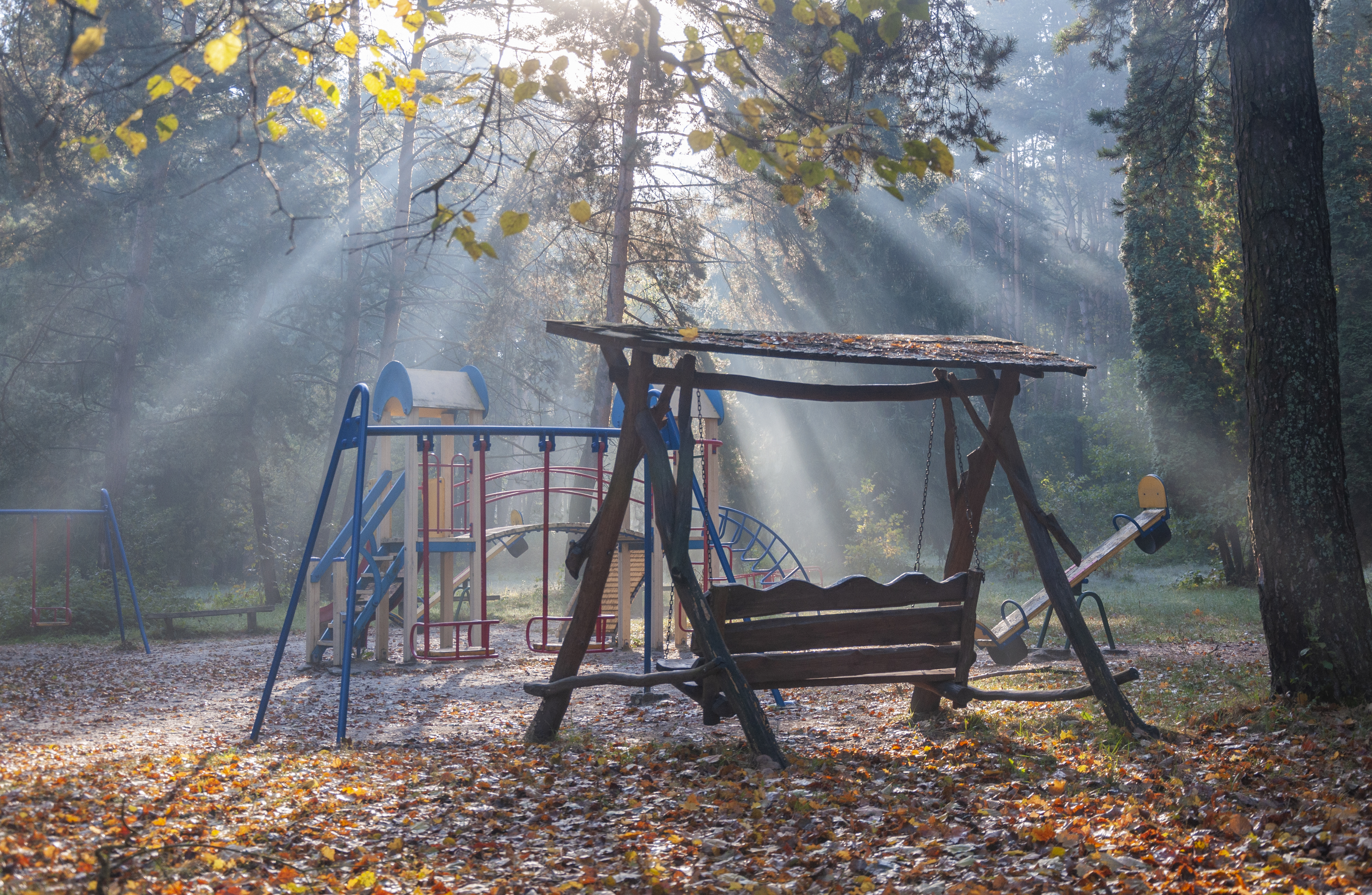
Children's playground in the sanatorium park, Shklo, Ukraine

The sanatorium, located in the village, is rich in combinations of natural medicinal factors. There are sources of slightly mineralised water “Naftusia-Shklo”, hydrogen-sulphidous springs of high and middle mineralization and peaty-mineral medicinal muds.

== Culture ==
The village has two sights of architecture Yavoriv Raion:

- Church of St. Paraskeva (wooden) 1732 (1454 /1).
- The bell tower of the church of St. Paraskeva (wooden) 1732 (1454 /2).

the village has one sight of architecture local importance:

- The Parish School of the 18th century. (556–м).

== Personalities ==
- Hordynsky Yaroslav Antonovich (1882–1939) – Ukrainian literary critic, literary historian, translator, teacher. Full member of the Shevchenko Scientific Society.

== Sources ==
- История Городов и Сёл. Шкло, Яворовский район - Львовская область (in Russian)
