= Dębno, Podkarpackie Voivodeship =

Dębno
- Village
- Location within Poland
- Coordinates: 50°11′52″N 22°31′1″E
- Country: Poland
- Voivodeship: Subcarpathian
- County: Leżajsk
- Gmina: Leżajsk
- Population: 1,500
- Time zone: UTC+1 (CET)
  - Summer (DST): UTC+2 (CEST)
- Vehicle registration: RLE

Dębno [ˈdɛmbnɔ] is a village in the administrative district of Gmina Leżajsk, within Leżajsk County, Subcarpathian Voivodeship, in south-eastern Poland.
