= Wiązownica massacre =

1945 massacre of Poles

Coordinates: 50.0822°N 22.7028°E

The Wiązownica massacre occurred on 17 April 1945 in the village Wiązownica, located in Jarosław County Subcarpathian Voivodeship, in southeastern Poland, then located in Lwów Voivodeship. It was one of the Massacres of Poles in Volhynia and Eastern Galicia, and was perpetrated by the Ukrainian Insurgent Army (UPA). The massacre occurred during a battle fought between the UPA and, initially, local Polish partisans, and, later, the Polish People's Army (LWP), towards the outskirts of Wiązownica. It saw the deaths of 91 civilians, including 20 women and children, alongside four LWP soldiers. The UPA also burned down 150 houses. In retaliation for the attack, the LWP led an attack on the village Piskorowice, given its large concentration of Ukrainians sympathetic for OUN.

There is a commemorative plaque to honor the victims of the massacre on the side of the church in Wiązownica. Several hundred attended when it was unveiled on 6 October 2013.

== Background ==
The Ukrainian Insurgent Army had been carrying out massacres since 1943 in instances of Anti-Polish sentiment. These attacks were often returned by the Polish Underground.

The massacre in Wiązownica was, according to activist Szczepan Siekierka, motivated by the killing of 10 ethnic Ukrainians, mainly women and children, in the village. This was, itself, a retaliation for the murder of a Pole.

== Massacre and battle ==
In the morning of 17 April 1945, the UPA began their assault on the village from the San by entering from a farm. The UPA immediately began to kill the residents of the farm, while also engaging against the emerging militia resistance. Concurrently, the soldiers also set fire to farm buildings and loaded livestock onto carts. Supplementing the militia resistance, the LWP and National Armed Forces (NSZ) arrived. The battle lasted five hours, saw the deaths of approximately 100 people (including 13-17 attackers), and 165 buildings were burned down, then constituting nearly half the village.

Additional reinforcements from Milicja Obywatelska arrived after the battle's end.
