= Rzuchów, Podkarpackie Voivodeship =

Rzuchów
- Village
- Location within Poland
- Coordinates: 50°14′N 22°30′E
- Country: Poland
- Voivodeship: Subcarpathian
- County: Leżajsk
- Gmina: Leżajsk

Rzuchów [ˈʐuxuf] is a village in the administrative district of Gmina Leżajsk, within Leżajsk County, Subcarpathian Voivodeship, in south-eastern Poland.
