= Ternovytsia =

Rural locality in Lviv Oblast, Ukraine

Ternovytsia Терновиця
- Flag Coat of arms

- Location in Lviv Oblast
- Coordinates: 49°54′30″N 23°28′57″E
- Country: Ukraine
- Oblast: Lviv Oblast
- Raion: Yavoriv Raion
- Hromada: Novoiavorivsk urban hromada
- Time zone: UTC+2 (EET)
  - Summer (DST): UTC+3 (EEST)
- Postal code: 81061

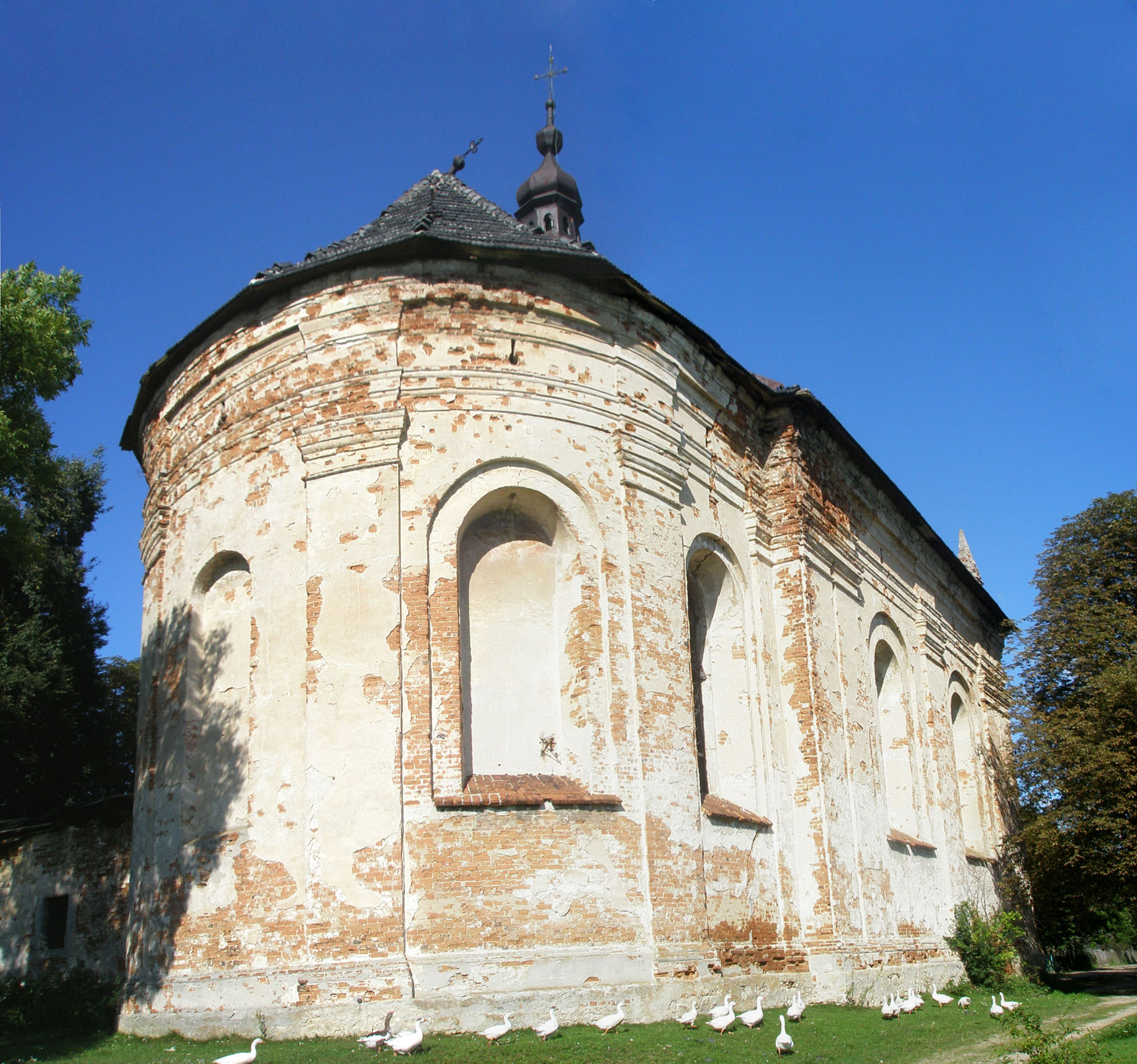
Church in the village of Ternovytsia (Yavoriv district)

Ternovytsia (Ukrainian: Терновиця) is a village in the Novoiavorivsk urban hromada of the Yavoriv Raion of Lviv Oblast in Ukraine.

== History ==
The first written mention of the village was in 1376.

== Religion ==
- Holy Trinity church (1864, wooden),
- Roman Catholic Church of the Holy Trinity (1645; future UGCC Metropolitan Andrei Sheptytskyi was baptized here).

== Sources ==
- "Bruchnal". Geographical Dictionary of the Kingdom of Poland (in Polish). 1. Warszawa: Kasa im. Józefa Mianowskiego. 1880. p. 383.
