= Holy Trinity Church, Ternovytsia =

Church in Ternovytsia, Ukraine

Holy Trinity Church
- Костел Святої Трійці
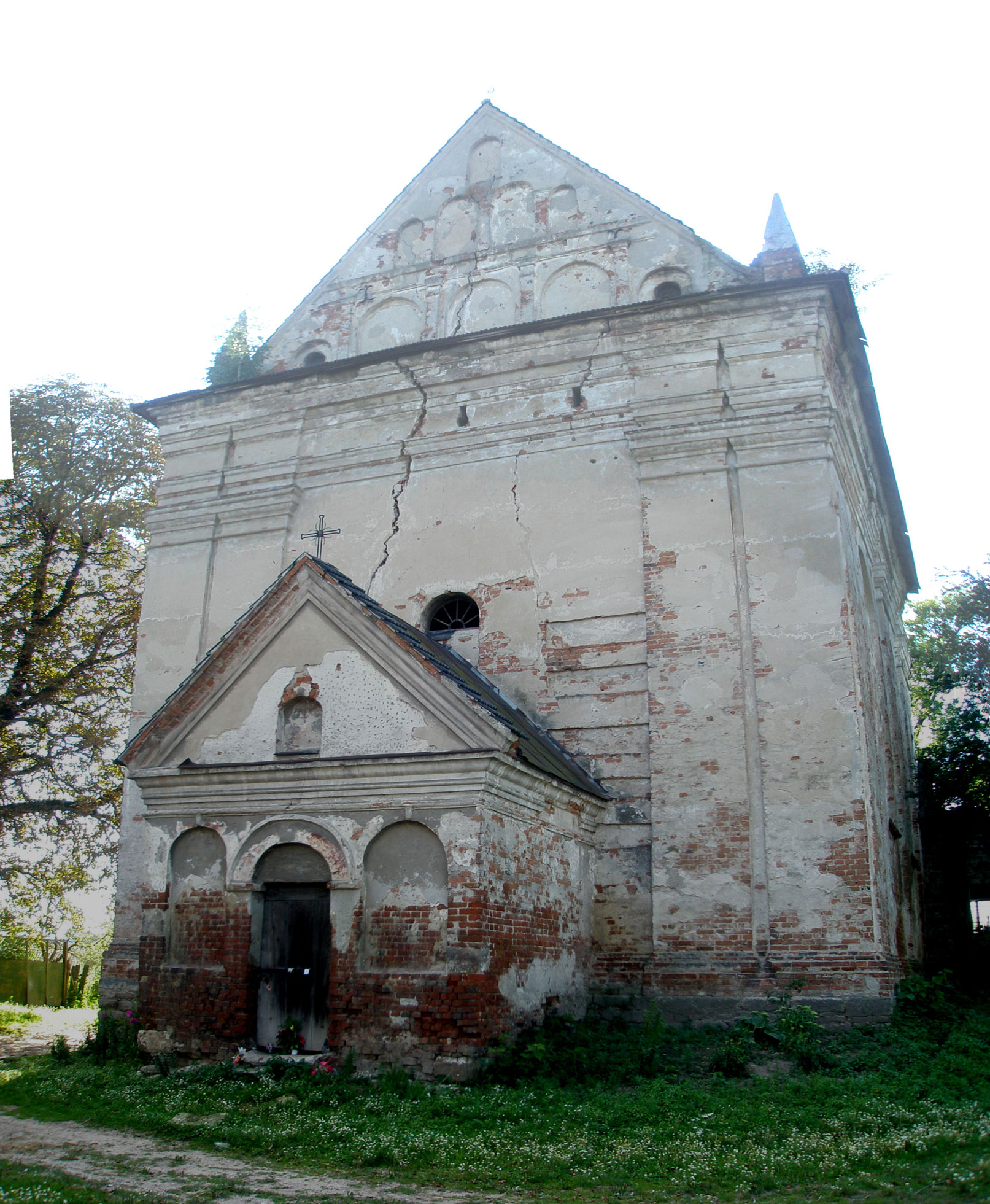
- The facade of the church

- Location within Lviv Oblast

Location
- Location: Ternovytsia
- Interactive map of Holy Trinity Church
- Coordinates: 49°54′16.55″N 23°28′55.60″E

Holy Trinity Church (Ukrainian: Костел Святої Трійці) is a Roman Catholic church in Ternovytsia, Lviv Oblast. It is an example of defensive architecture. The place of baptism of the Metropolitan of the UGCC Andrey Sheptytsky.

== History ==
The church, built in 1645, served as a Calvinist congregation for some time. In 1718, it was reconsecrated.

The mother of Andrey Sheptytsky, Zofia Szeptycka, née Fredro, donated a hand-painted icon of the Sacred Heart of Jesus to the church. On 17 January 1901, she gave him this painting after his appointment as Metropolitan of the UGCC. Metropolitan Andrey took the icon with him to the metropolitan palace on Mount Saint George (in Lviv), where it was kept until 1946. In June 2015, the icon was displayed for worship in St. George's Cathedral in Lviv.

At the end of 2018, a religious community of the Holy Trinity Church was established, which plans to renovate this temple.

== Gallery ==
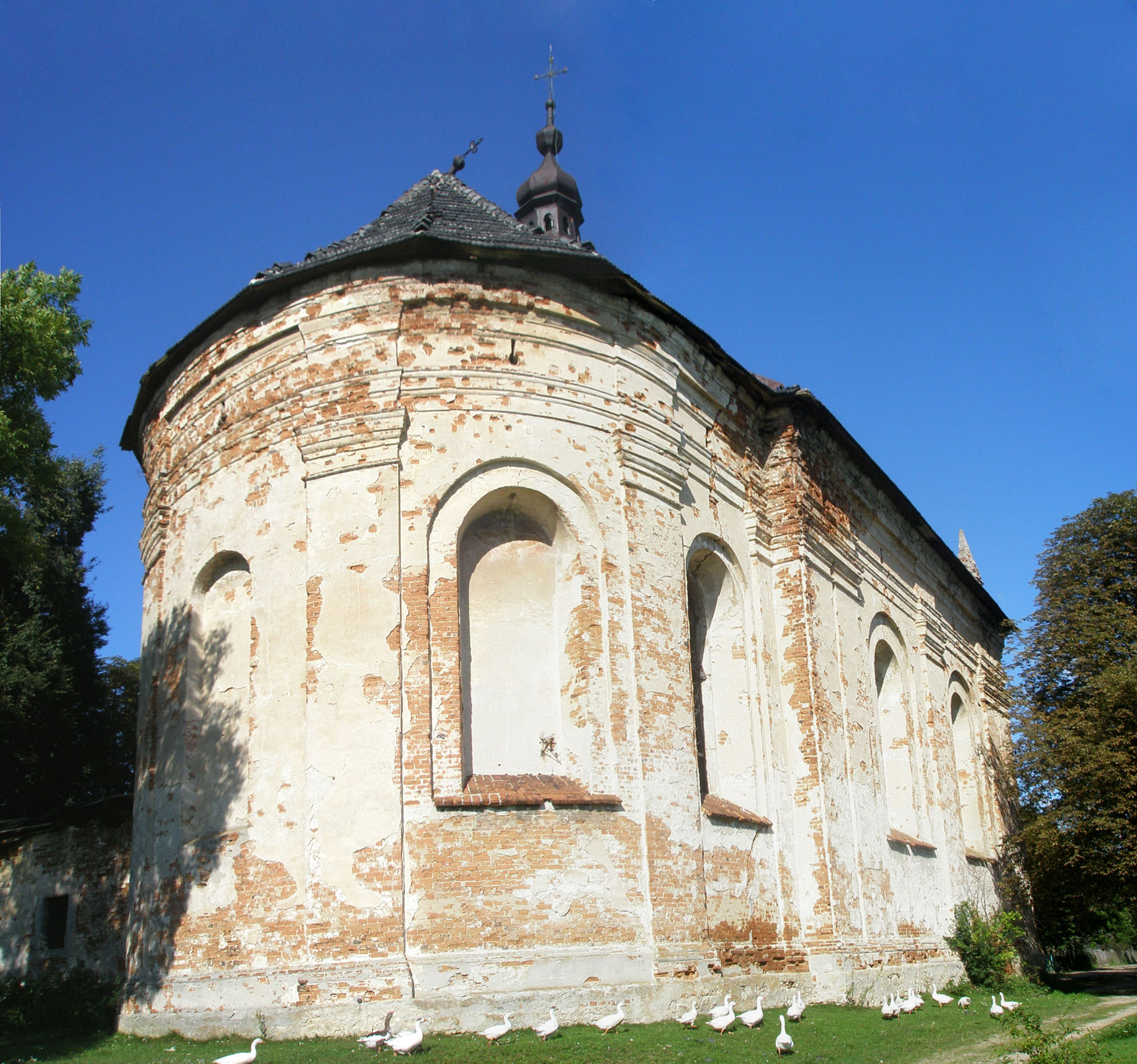
Back side

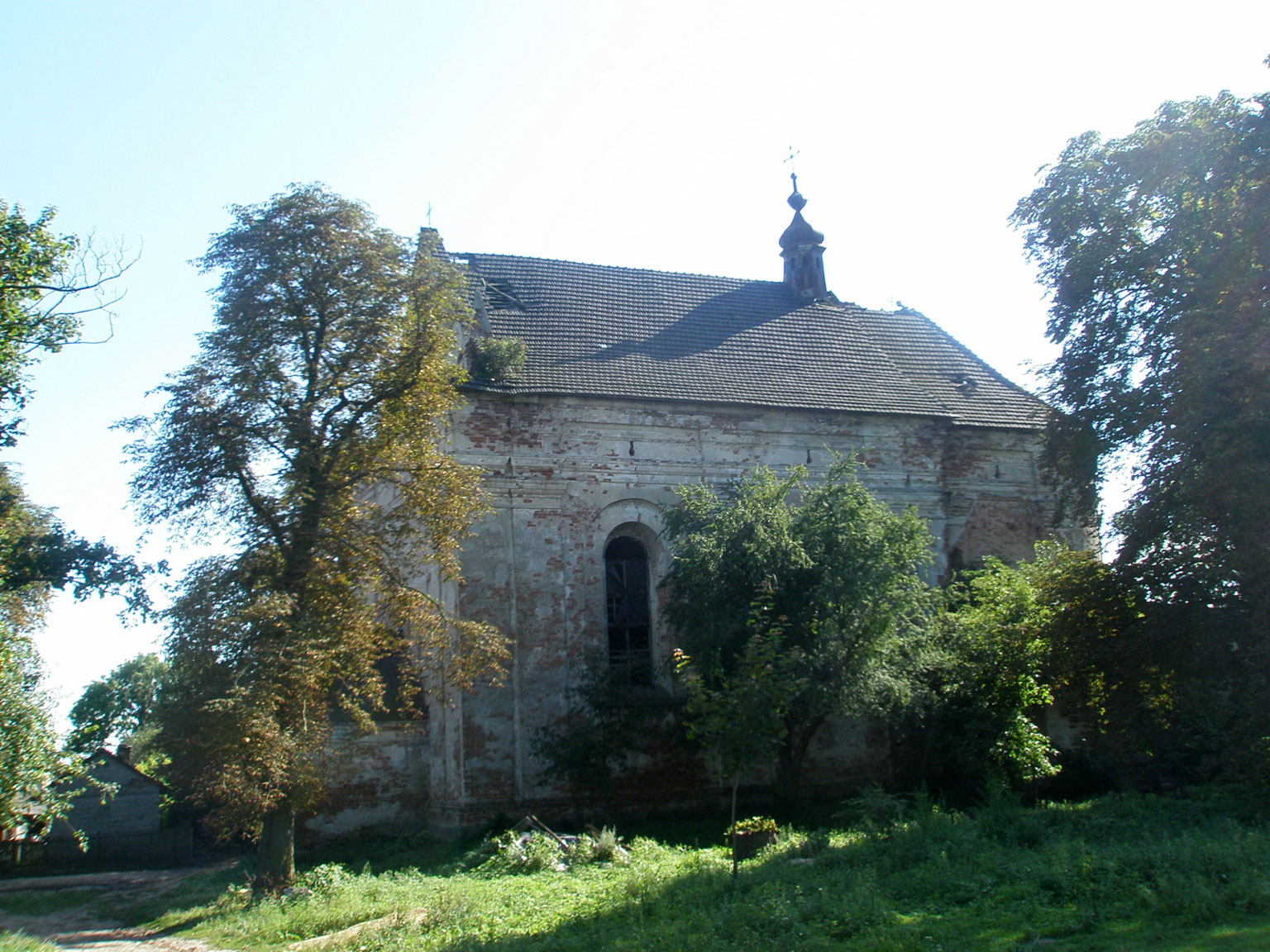
Panoramic view

== Bibliography ==
- "Bruchnal". Geographical Dictionary of the Kingdom of Poland (in Polish). 1. Warszawa: Kasa im. Józefa Mianowskiego. 1880. p. 383.
