= Przychojec =

- Village
- Location within Poland
- Coordinates: 50°18′N 22°24′E
- Country: Poland
- Voivodeship: Subcarpathian
- County: Leżajsk
- Gmina: Leżajsk
- Population: 1,000

Przychojec [pʂɨˈxɔjɛt͡s] is a village in the administrative district of Gmina Leżajsk, within Leżajsk County, Subcarpathian Voivodeship, in south-eastern Poland.
