= Józef Zych =

Polish politician

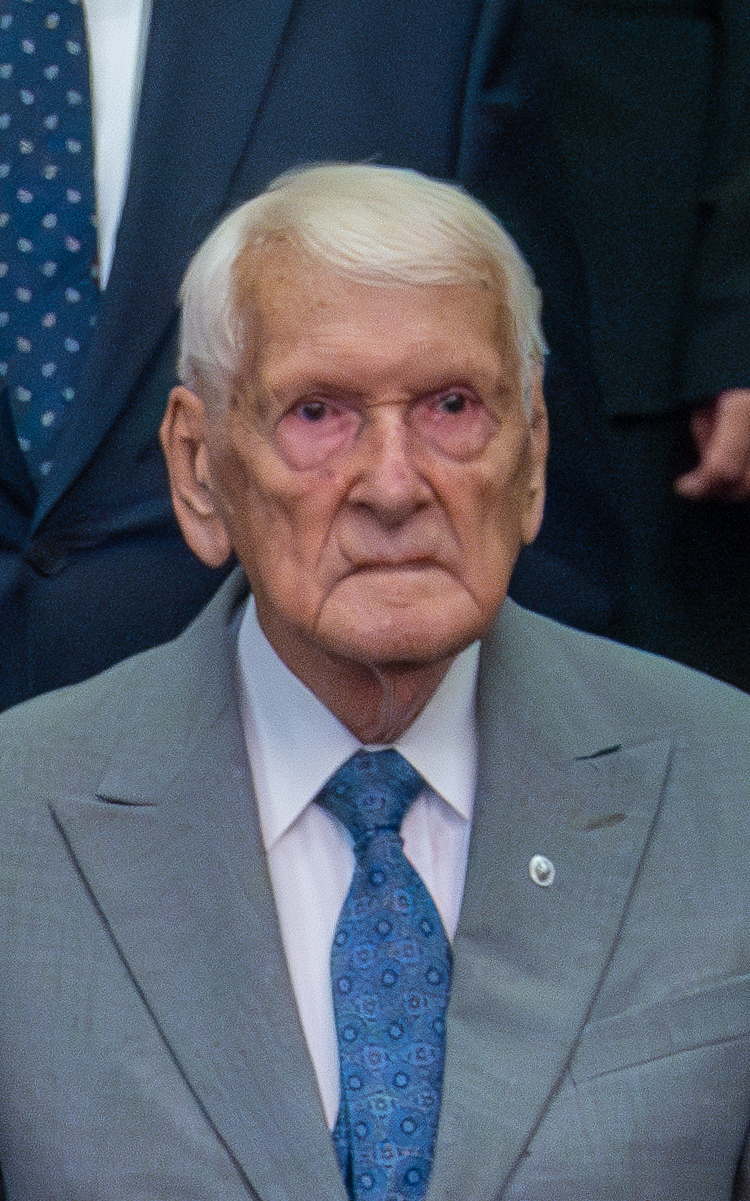
- Zych at the inauguration of Karol Nawrocki in 2025

Senior Marshal of the Sejm
- In office 8 November 2011 – 12 November 2015
- Nominated by: Bronisław Komorowski
- Marshal: Ewa Kopacz
- Preceded by: Zbigniew Religa
- Succeeded by: Kornel Morawiecki
- In office 19 October 2005 – 24 October 2005
- Nominated by: Aleksander Kwaśniewski
- Marshal: Marek Jurek
- Preceded by: Aleksander Małachowski
- Succeeded by: Zbigniew Religa

Marshal of the Sejm
- In office 3 March 1995 – 19 October 1997
- Preceded by: Józef Oleksy
- Succeeded by: Maciej Płażyński

Personal details
- Born: 23 March 1938 (age 88) Giedlarowa, Second Polish Republic
- Party: Polish People's Party
- Profession: Lawyer

Józef Zych (pronounced [ˈjuzɛv ˈzɨx]; born 23 March 1938) is a Polish lawyer, academic, and politician of the Polish People's Party. Between 1983 and 1991, he served as President of the National Council of Attorneys-at-law. He was Member of the Sejm for the United People's Party and the Polish People's Party from 1989 to 2015, Deputy Marshal of the Sejm for the first, second and fourth terms from 1991 to 1995 and 2004 to 2005, Senior Marshal of the Sejm for the fifth and seventh terms, and member of the State Tribunal from 2015 to 2019 and since 2023.

== Life and career ==
From an early age, Zych participated in scouting activities and faced legal challenges. In 1961, he received a jail sentence for non-compliance with official duties during a scout camp near Krosno Odrzańskie.

He completed his education at the Bolesław Chrobry High School in Leżajsk in 1956. He later graduated with a law degree from the Faculty of Law at the Adam Mickiewicz University in Poznań in 1966. Under the academic supervision of Andrzej Wąsiewicz, he earned his doctorate in 1976, specialising in labour and social security law. He pursued a career in law, serving as an attorney at law and eventually becoming the president of the National Council of Attorneys-at-law between 1983 and 1991.

Zych’s political career began with his membership in the United People's Party in 1975, and he was elected as a Member of Parliament for the party in 1989. He played significant roles in various committees and councils, including the Council for the Protection of Struggle and Martyrdom Remembrance. He was instrumental in transforming the Polish People’s Party, serving in key leadership positions.

Throughout his tenure in the Sejm, Zych held various prestigious positions, including Deputy Marshal and Marshal, and was actively involved in adopting the 1997 Constitution of the Republic of Poland. He was repeatedly elected as a Member of Parliament, serving from 1991 to 2015, and held significant roles such as Senior Marshal and chairmanship of committees.

After 2015, Zych continued his involvement in public service and academia, including positions at the State Tribunal and as an advisor at the Polish Insurance Association. He also contributed to academic work and taught at the Collegium Intermarium linked to the ultra-conservative Ordo Iuris.

Political offices
Preceded by Józef Oleksy	Marshal of the Sejm; 1995–1997	Succeeded by Maciej Płażyński
