= Bogusław Szwacz =

Polish artist

- Born: March 27, 1912; Leżajsk, Poland
- Died: February 24, 2009 (aged 96); Warsaw, Poland
- Resting place: Powązki Military Cemetery
- Known for: Painting, poetry, sculpture, philosophy
- Movement: Abstractionism, Cubism, Informel, Modernism
- Website: http://szwacz.eu

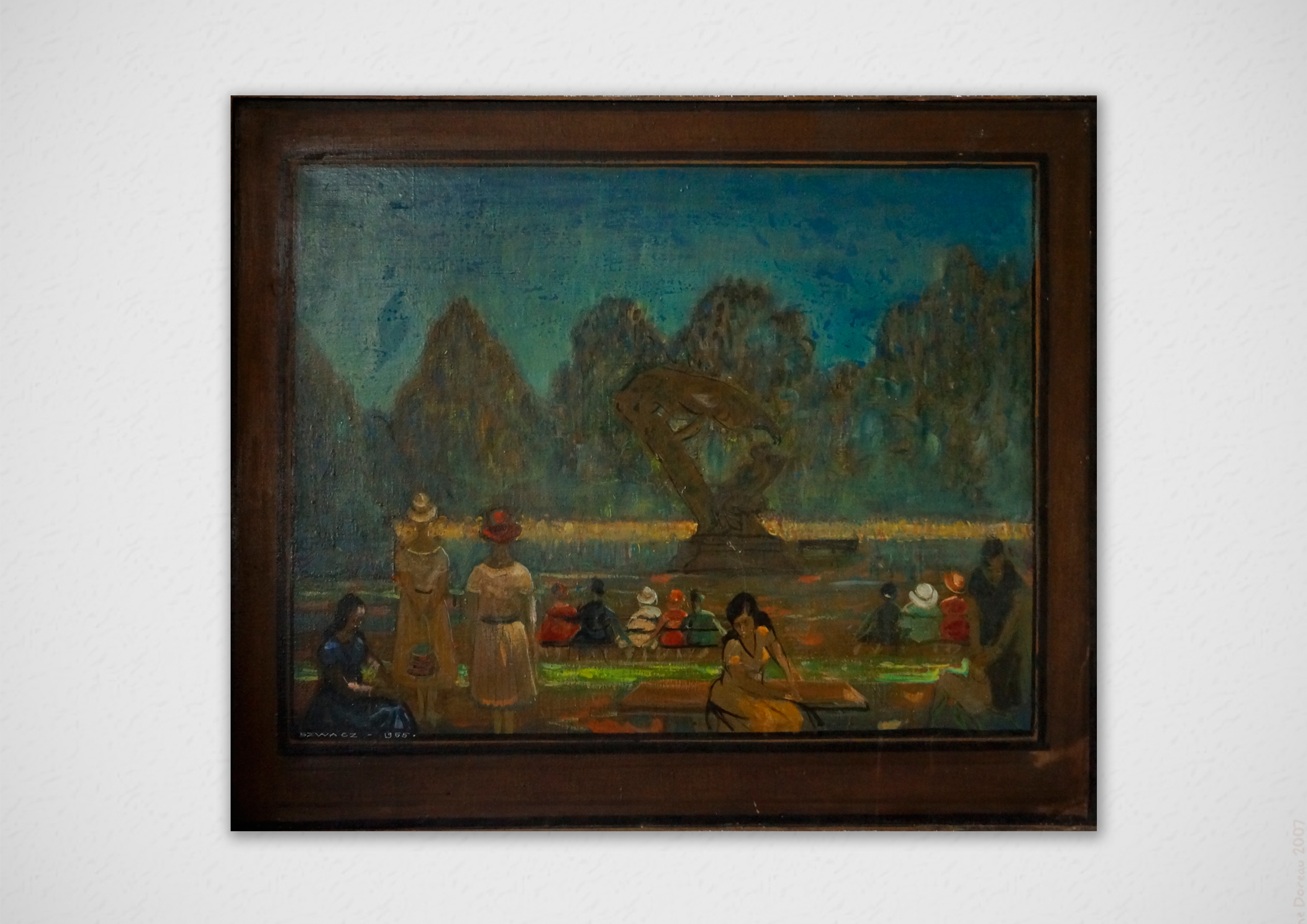
Concert at the Chopin Statue, 1965, Oil on canvas.

Bogusław Szwacz [ˈbɔɡuswav] [ˈszvat͡sz] (27 March 1912 – 24 February 2009) was a Polish-born artist, painter, sculptor, professor and lecturer at Warsaw Academy of Fine Arts.

== Life and education ==
Hailed as one of the most significant Polish artists of the post-war period, Boguslaw Szwacz first developed his artistic talents in 1924 as a student at the renowned Krzemieniec Lyceum.

In addition to studying under Władysław Galimski and Stanisław Sheybal, Szwacz pursued a degree at the Kraków Academy of Fine Arts in 1930. Here, he studied in the studios of Ignacy Pieńkowski, Władysław Jarocki, Karol Frycz, Jan Hoplinski, Teodor Axentowicz and Xawery Dunikowski, among others. Szwacz graduated with honours in 1937, and was awarded the right to unlimited use of the artistic studios as a grant of the rector.

Amidst his studies, Szwacz underwent training at the Infantry Reserve Officer Cadet School in Zambrów. During the Second World War, as a staff officer and commander of an anti-tank battery, he took part in battles around Kraków and his hometown, Lvov (Battle of Lwów).

After the Polish surrender, Szwacz escaped to Kowel and made his way back to Kraków.

In post-war Poland, Szwacz officially began his artistic career. For a short time, he lived in Tyniec, where he painted a cycle of watercolour landscapes. He then joined the Association of Polish Artists and Designers in Kraków, and together with a group including Tadeusz Kantor and Jerzy Nowosielski, he founded ‘The Young Artists.' The group organized a celebrated exhibition of modern painting – The Young Artists Group Exhibition in the rooms of the Palace of Art in Kraków in October 1946. The same year, Szwacz became a lecturer at his alma mater.

In 1947, Szwacz went to France for a year on a scholarship from the Ministry of Culture and Art. During his time in Paris, he met and befriended several avant-garde artists including Fernand Léger, Édouard Pignon, Hans Hartung, Jean Bazaine, Maurice Estève and Noël Arnaude, who was the editorial secretary of a journal published by the influential artists’ group, "Le Surréalisme Révolutionnaire" (Revue bimestrielle publié par le Bureau International du Surréalisme – Révolutionnaire). Impressed with Szwacz, Arnaud enlisted him as a co-founder and correspondent of the magazine.

Along with another Parisian artists group, he took part in an exhibition in the René Breteau gallery and in the III "Salon des Réalités Nouvelles" in 1948.

When he returned to Poland, Szwacz settled down in Warsaw and began lecturing at PWSSP, which was transformed in 1950 into the Warsaw Academy of Fine Arts. Soon after joining the Young Artists and Scientists Club in Warsaw, his social-realist paintings gained popularity; he participated in four impressive Modern Art Exhibitions in the city from 1948 to 1959.

Szwacz retired from his position as professor in 1982, devoting himself to poetry and perfecting his trademark idea of art – Ars Horme.

A lover of classical music, astronomy and physics, he played the violin and composed simple fiddle pieces.

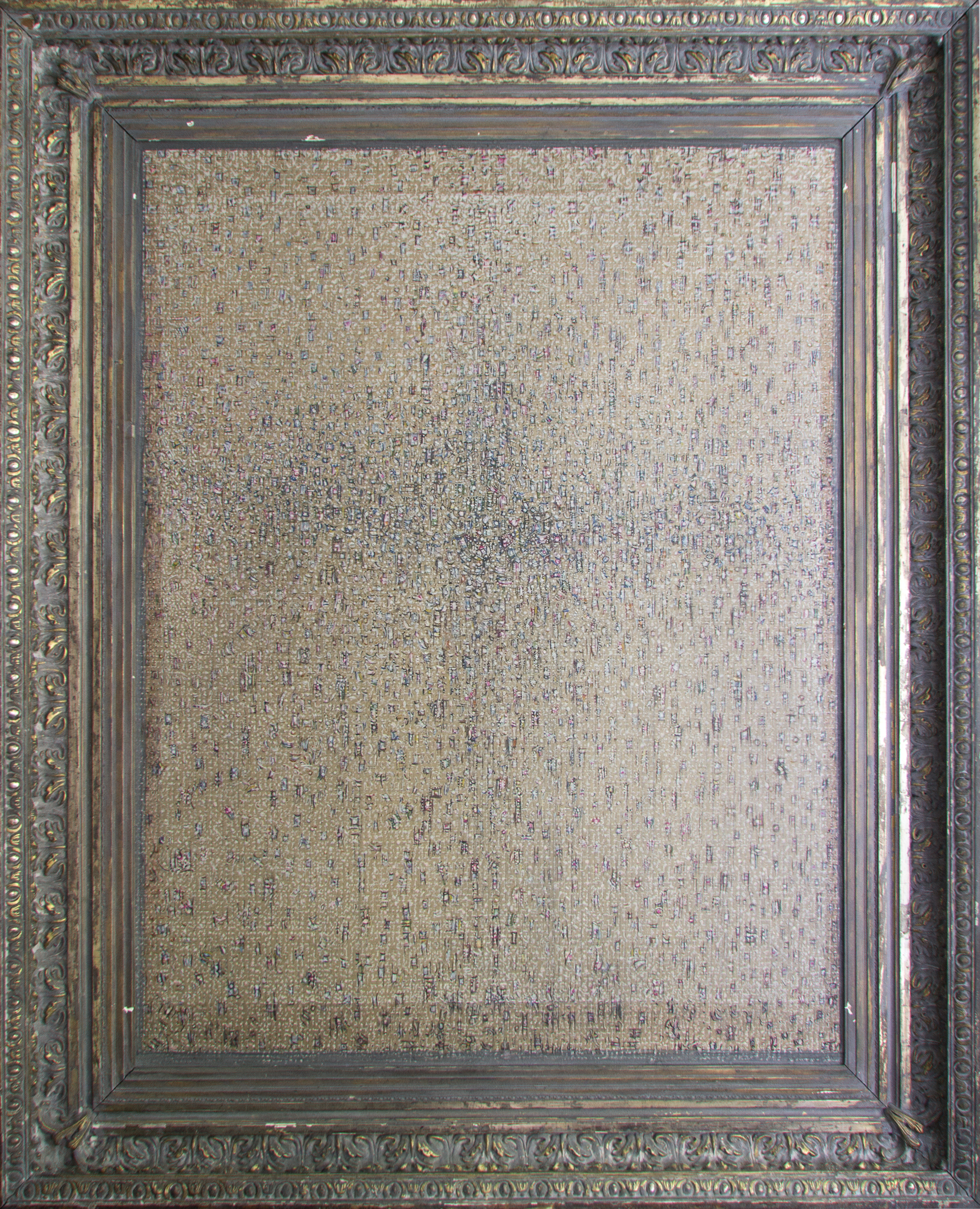
Mozart Ars – Hormegryf, 1976, oil and tempera on canvas, 177x132 cm

In 2005, he was awarded the Officer's Cross of the Order of Polonia Restituta. He had previously been decorated with the Gold Cross of Merit and the Medal of the 10th Anniversary of People's Poland.

== Work ==
Although traditionally trained in realism, Szwacz began to experiment with cubism and in his later years, informel. After 1955, he abandoned figurative art and switched to abstractionism, at which time he developed his trademark concept — Ars-Horme, or "The Art of Moving the Imagination". Szwacz presented the tenets of Ars-Horme in the form of an artistic manifesto in 1977 at an open-air exhibition in Osieki. His characteristic compositions, created in the Ars-Horme style are called ars-hormegryphs and ars-hormegrams. They include watercolours, prints, reliefs, paintings, gouaches.

In the 1960s, Szwacz exhibited in the Krzywe Koło Gallery in Warsaw and took part in the First Biennale of Spatial Forms in Elbląg (1965), where his sculptures can still be seen in the municipal spaces. In his spare time, he wrote sonnets, which are estimated to number approximately 4000. Some of them were published in 1988 in two volumes.

Szwacz took part in many exhibitions around Europe including France, Switzerland, Germany, Spain, Czech Republic, Slovenia, Serbia, Norway and Turkmenistan.

In the 1940s, and again in the 1970s, his work was presented at exhibitions featuring contemporary Polish art in New York, Chicago and Washington, D.C.
