= Piskorowice =

- Village
- Location within Poland
- Coordinates: 50°14′7″N 22°31′44″E
- Country: Poland
- Voivodeship: Subcarpathian
- County: Leżajsk
- Gmina: Leżajsk

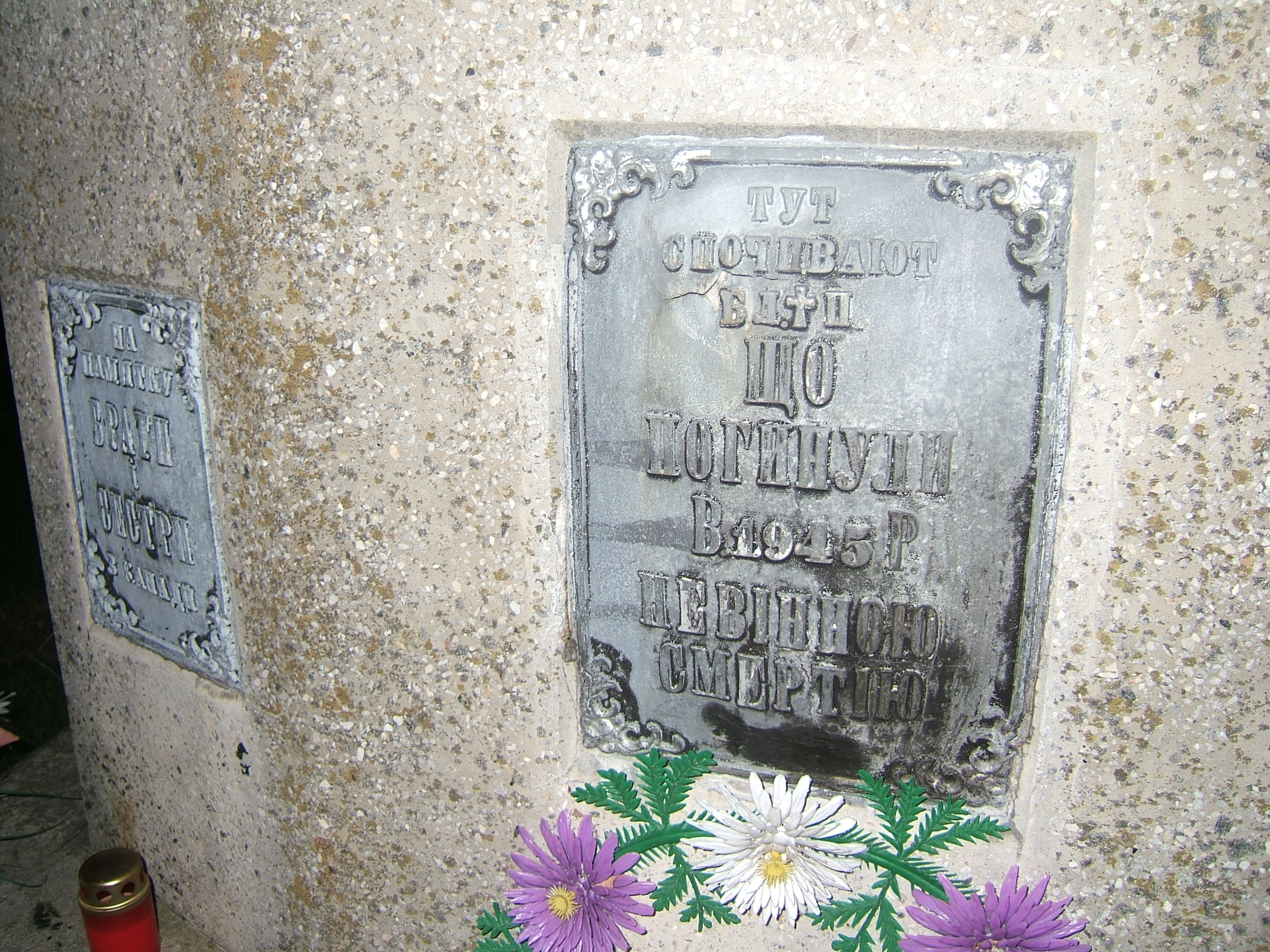
Piskorowice Memorial

Piskorowice [pʲiskɔrɔˈvʲit͡sɛ] is a village in the administrative district of Gmina Leżajsk, within Leżajsk County, Subcarpathian Voivodeship, in south-eastern Poland.

In Piskorowice and outlying villages a massacre of between 160 and 400 ethnic Ukrainians led by members of the National Military Organization of the "Wolyniak" group, aided by Polish civilians, took place on 16 April 1945. It is sometimes referred to as part of the wider Pawłokoma massacres.

From the Polish viewpoint of that time these actions were deemed to be retaliation for the anti-Polish crimes against humanity committed by the UPA. The immediate reason of this retaliation was the massacre committed by UPA the day before in the village Wiązownica.
