= Giedlarowa =

- Village
- Location within Poland
- Coordinates: 50°13′N 22°24′E
- Country: Poland
- Voivodeship: Subcarpathian
- County: Leżajsk
- Gmina: Leżajsk
- Population: 4,096
- Time zone: UTC+1 (CET)
  - Summer (DST): UTC+2 (CEST)
- Vehicle registration: RLE

Giedlarowa [ɡʲɛdlaˈrɔva] is a village in the administrative district of Gmina Leżajsk, within Leżajsk County, Subcarpathian Voivodeship, in south-eastern Poland.

== Notable people ==
- Józef Zych (1938–), lawyer, politician, and former Marshal of the Sejm.
