= Leżajsk =

Town in Subcarpathian Voivodeship, Poland

- Free Royal City of Leżajsk
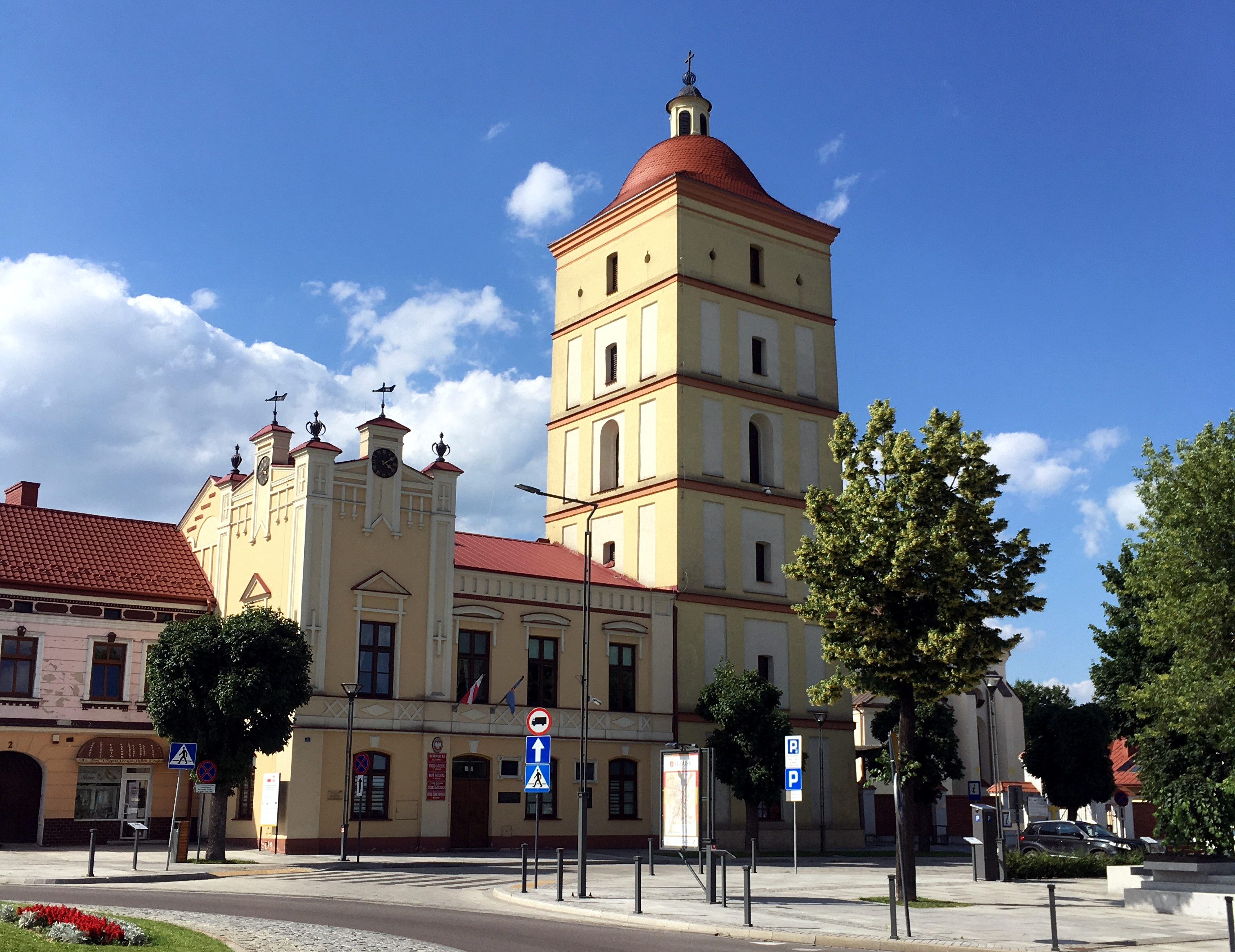
- Town Hall and market square

- Coat of arms
- Interactive map of Leżajsk
- Location within Poland
- Coordinates: 50°16′N 22°26′E
- Country: Poland
- Voivodeship: Subcarpathian
- County: Leżajsk
- Gmina: Leżajsk (urban gmina)

Government
  - Mayor: Krzysztof Trębacz

Area
  - Total: 20.29 km^{2} (7.83 sq mi)

Population (June 2017)
  - Total: 13,871
  - Density: 683.6/km^{2} (1,771/sq mi)
- Time zone: UTC+1 (CET)
  - Summer (DST): UTC+2 (CEST)
- Postal code: 37–300
- Car plates: RLE
- Website: www.miastolezajsk.pl

Leżajsk, (Note: Polish: [ˈlɛʐajsk]; Yiddish: ליזשענסק-Lizhensk; Ukrainian: Лежа́йськ, romanized: Lezháysʹk) officially the Free Royal City of Leżajsk, (Note: Polish: Wolne Królewskie Miasto Leżajsk) is a town in southeastern Poland with 13,871 inhabitants. Since 1999, it has been situated in the Subcarpathian Voivodeship and is the capital of Leżajsk County.

Leżajsk is famed for its Bernadine basilica and monastery, built by the architect Antonio Pellacini. The basilica contains a highly regarded pipe organ from the second half of the 17th century and organ recitals take place there. It stands as one of Poland's official national Historic Monuments (Pomnik historii), as designated April 20, 2005, and tracked by the National Heritage Board of Poland. Leżajsk is also home of the Leżajsk brewery. The town is crossed by a forest creek Jagoda.

== History ==
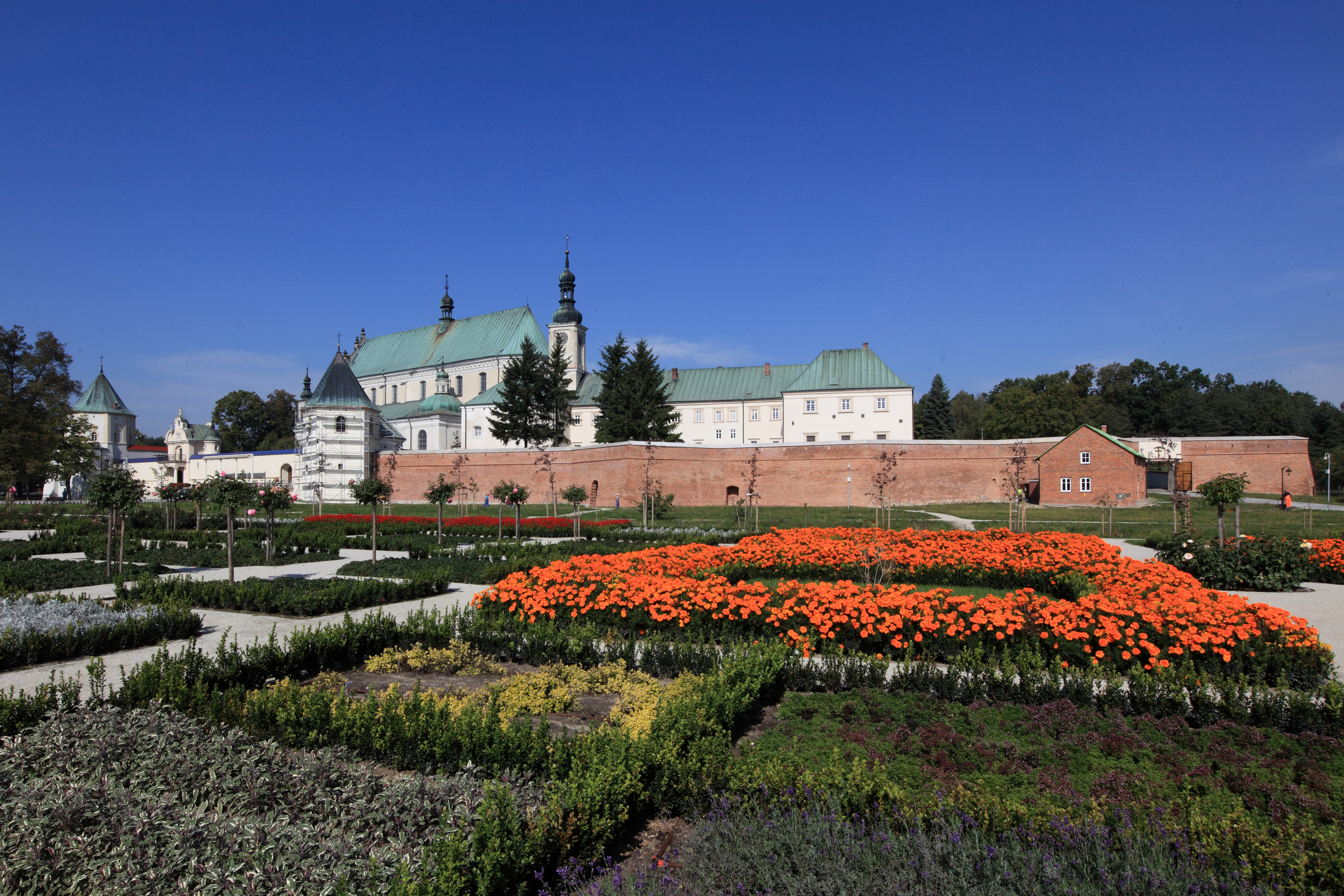
Baroque Basilica of St. Mary and Bernardine Monastery

Leżajsk is an old Polish royal town. The development of Leżajsk was slow, due to numerous and devastating Tatar and Wallachian raids, which took place in 1498, 1500, 1509, 1519 and 1524. Following these raids, Polish kings granted several privileges to the looted town, and finally, on September 23, 1524, in Lwów, King Sigismund I the Old decided to move Leżajsk to a new location, which was easier to defend. The town was moved some 5 kilometers south-west, and its new name was Leżajsk Zygmuntowski. The old location is since known as the village Stare Miasto ("Old Town"). During the reign of Sigismund II Augustus, Leżajsk prospered due to protection of its starosta (local governor), Krzysztof Szydłowiecki (Odrowaz coat of arms), who was Crown Chancellor. In 1608, Bernadine monks from nearby Przeworsk were brought to Lezajsk by Bishop of Przemyśl, and two years later, the first brick church was built. In 1624 Lezajsk was looted and burned by Crimean Tatars and the subsequent Swedish invasion of Poland (1655–1660) brought more destruction.

In the mid-18th century, 57% of the town's population was Roman Catholic (Polish), 26% was Jewish, and 17% was Greek Catholic (Ruthenian).

Following the First Partition of Poland (1772), Leżajsk was annexed by the Habsburg Empire, and remained in Austrian Galicia until November 1918. In 1809, the town was captured by the Duchy of Warsaw, but soon afterwards, it was retaken by the Austrians. In 1896–1900, a rail line connecting Lezajsk with Przeworsk and Rozwadow was completed. The town suffered during World War I, as Austro-Hungarian and Russian armies fought there in 1914 and 1915. Lezajsk was occupied by Russians between November 1914 and May 1915.

In 1918 Poland regained independence and control of the town. In the Second Polish Republic, Leżajsk belonged to Łańcut County of the Lwów Voivodeship. In July 1929, the town was visited by President Ignacy Mościcki.

During the German invasion of Poland, which started World War II, on September 13, 1939, Leżajsk was captured by the Wehrmacht. Afterwards, the German Einsatzgruppe I entered the town to commit various atrocities against the population. On November 3, 1939, the German security police carried out mass arrests of local Poles as part of the Intelligenzaktion. The Poles were then either imprisoned in the local prison or massacred at the local cemetery. Among the massacred Poles were teachers, school principals, priests and military officers. Poles from Leżajsk were also among the victims of the large Katyn massacre, committed by the Russians in April–May 1940. During the German occupation, the Home Army was very active in the area. Since May 1940, underground Polish newspaper Odwet was distributed in Leżajsk by the Polish resistance movement. On May 28, 1943, Germans shot 43 residents of the town. Leżajsk was captured by the Home Army on July 27, 1944.

== Jewish community ==
The Jewish cemetery in Leżajsk is a place of pilgrimage for Jews from all over the world, who come to visit the tomb of Elimelech, the great 18th century Hasidic Rebbe. From the early 1500s until the advent of World War II and the Holocaust, there was a major Jewish presence in Leżajsk. After the Jewish expulsions from Spain in 1492, many Jews ended up in Leżajsk. According to the census of 1764, the community numbered 909 people, and by the turn of the 20th century, there were 1,700 Jews in the community. Between the two world wars, 4,500 Jews were living in Lezajsk.

When Nazi Germany invaded Leżajsk in September 1939, almost all Jews in the town were brought to the Soviet-Occupied zone, where they were later massacred by the Einsatzgruppen.

== Mayors and heads of the city after World War II ==
- Leopold Zawilski
- Felix Mallard
- Aleksander Schmidt
- Franciszek Urbański
- Kazimierz Gdula
- Jan Płaza
- Eugeniusz Mendyk
- Kazimierz Kuźniar
- Roman Baj
- Józef Samojezdny
- Zbigniew Ząbczyk
- Andrzej Janas
- Tadeusz Trębacz
- Janusz Wylaź
- Tadeusz Trębacz
- Piotr Urban
- Ireneusz Stefański
- Krzysztof Trębacz (now)

== Location ==
According to data from January 1, 2011, the city's area was 20.58 km^{2}. According to data from 2006, Leżajsk has an area of 20.6 km^{2}, including: farmland: 51%, forested area: 23%, and the city is 3.48% of the county's area.

== Landmarks ==
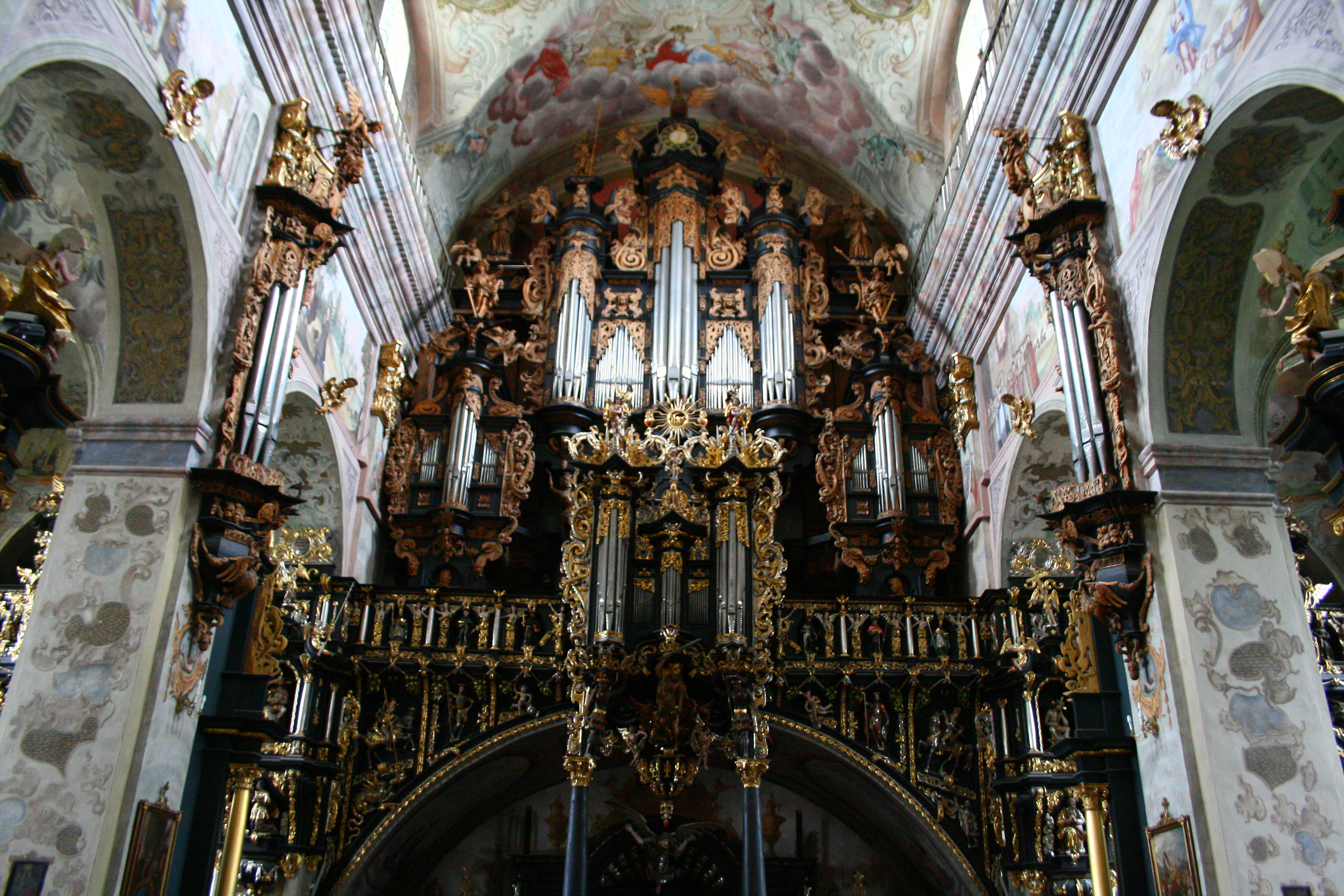
Famous baroque organs in the Basilica of St. Mary

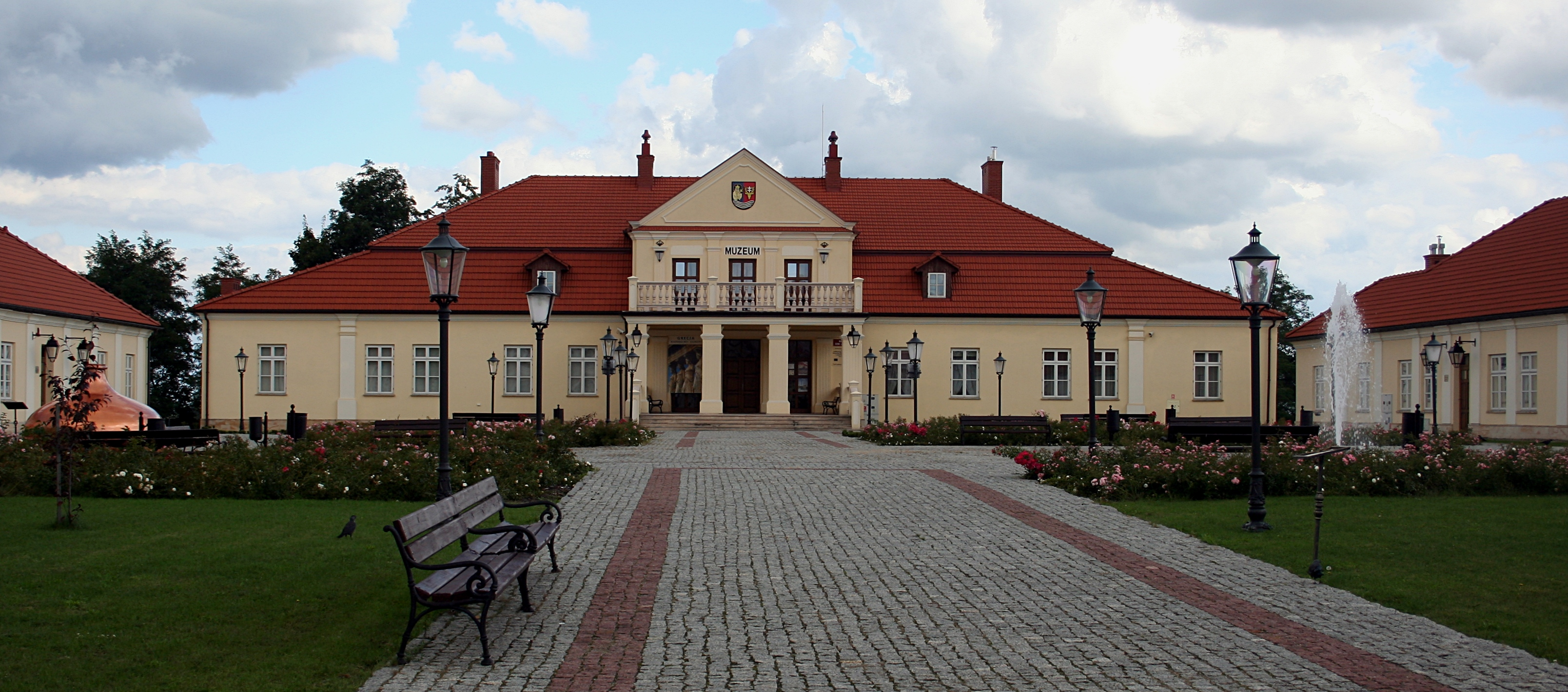
Old starost manor, which houses the regional museum

- Baroque Bernardine Order Monastery and Church Complex, with the famous pipe organs by Stanisław Studziński and Jan Głowiński, accomplished in 1693, and the Museum of the Franciscan Friars Province
- Old manor of local starosts, housing the regional museum
- Holy Trinity and All Saints' Parish Church
- Town Hall at the Rynek (Market Square)
- Mier Palace, 4 Furgalskiego Street
- Former Greek Catholic Parish Church under the invocation of Holy Virgin's Rest, currently known as the Succursal Roman Catholic Church
- Jewish Cemetery at Górna Street, established in the 18th century. In the cemetery is the tomb of Rabbi Elimelech Weissblum.
- Arsenal, Furgalskiego Street, the 19th century
- Municipal Public Library. The library was erected before 1914 as a social and cultural club of the "Proświta" Ukrainian Association and has functioned as the library since 1956.

== Sports ==
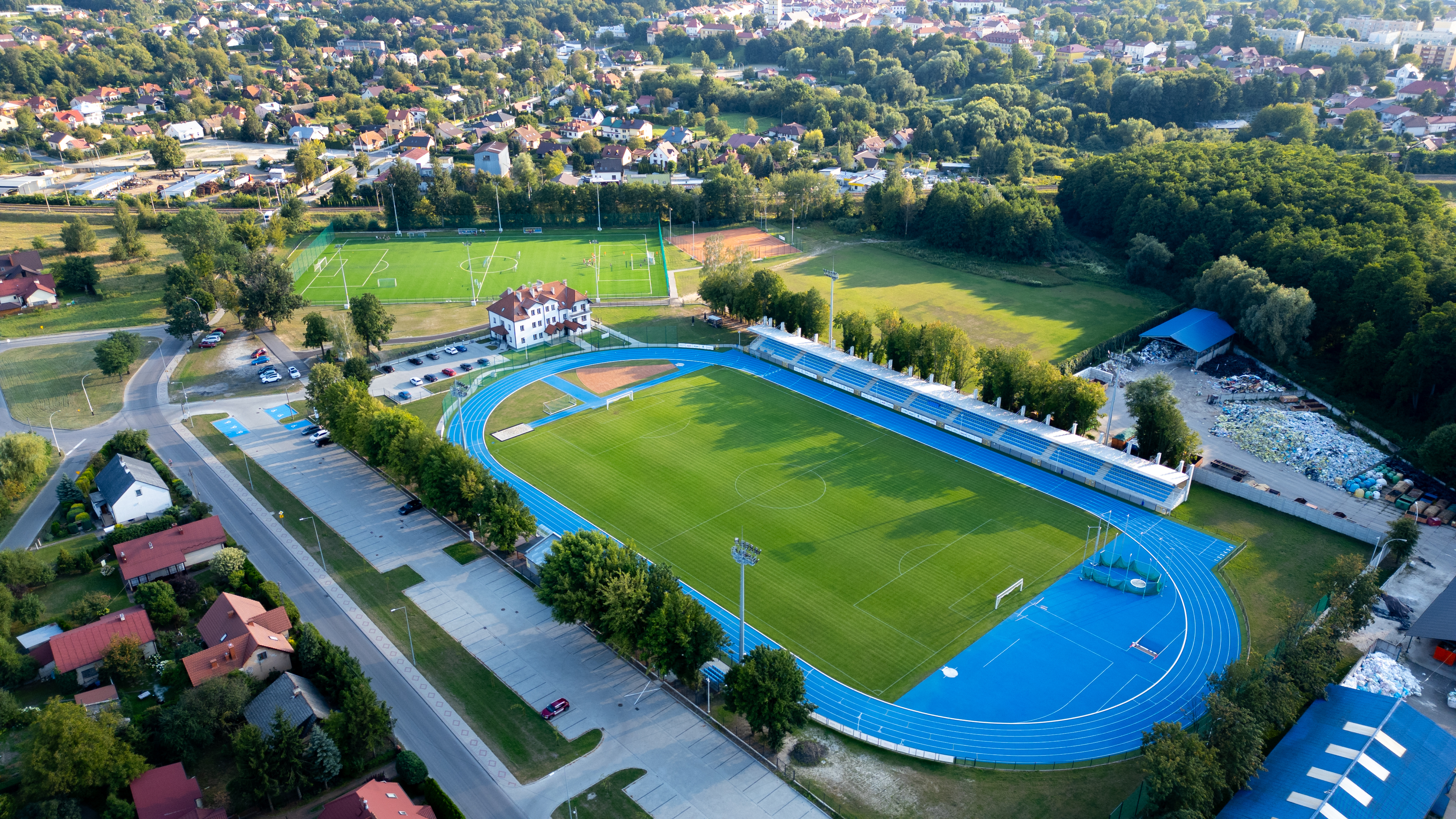
Municipal stadium used by the local football team Pogoń Leżajsk

The local football club is Pogoń Leżajsk. It competes in the lower leagues.

== Notable residents ==
- Rabbi Elimelech Weisblum (1717–1787), one of the Hasidic movement's founding Rebbes.
- Count Jan Potocki (1761–1815), captain, engineer of the Crown Army, ethnologist, Egyptologist, linguist, and author.
- Tadeusz Hollender (1910–1943), Polish poet, translator, humorist and member of the Polish resistance movement in World War II, murdered by the Gestapo
- Boguslaw Szwacz (1912–2009), artist and teacher
- Tadeusz Lubicz-Niezabitowski (1896–1952), colonel who served in the Polish Armed Forces and took part in the Battle of Grudziądz

== Gallery ==
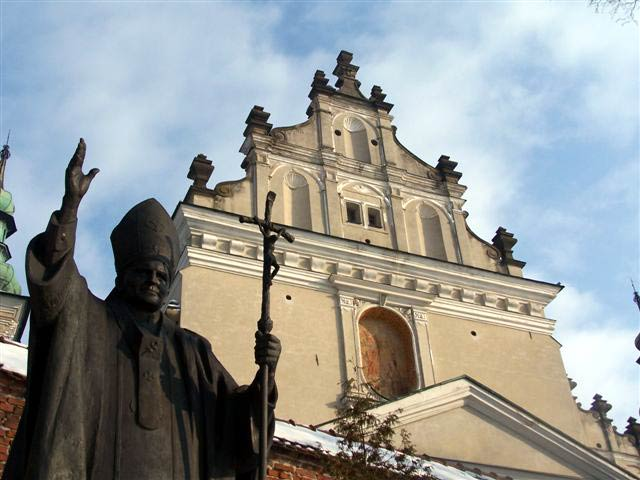
The façade of the Basilica of St. Mary

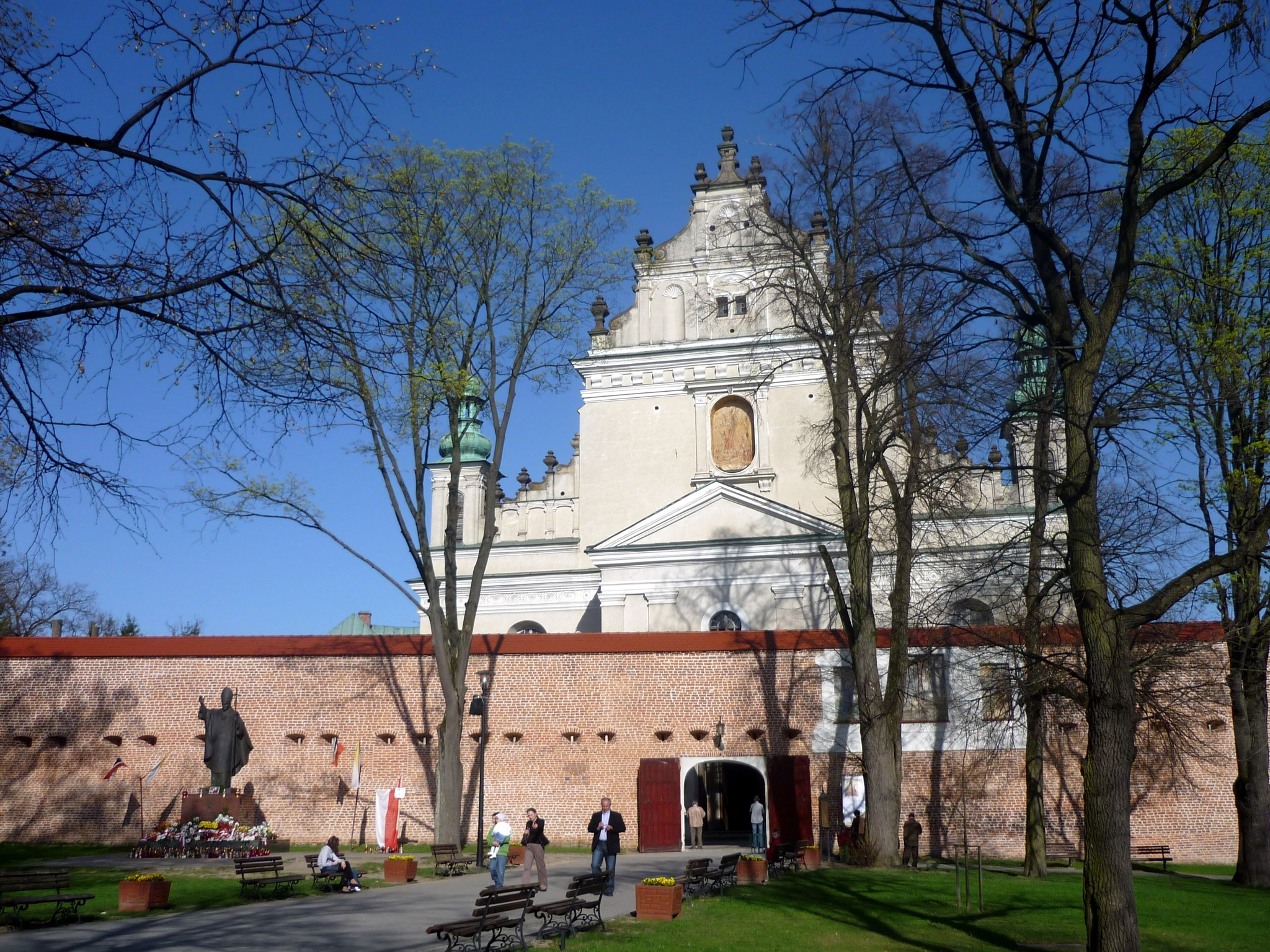
Entrance to the basilica

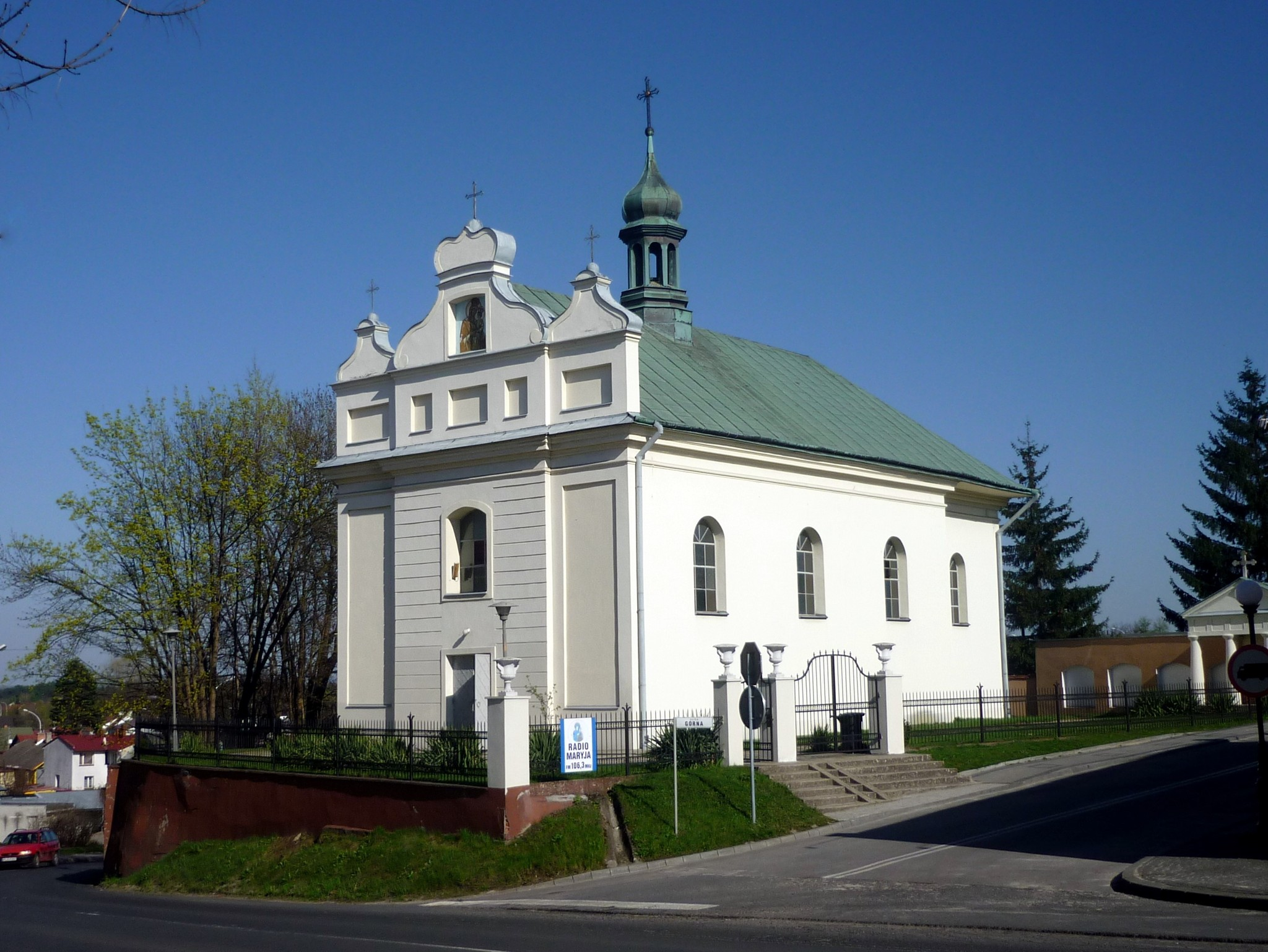
Church of the Dormition

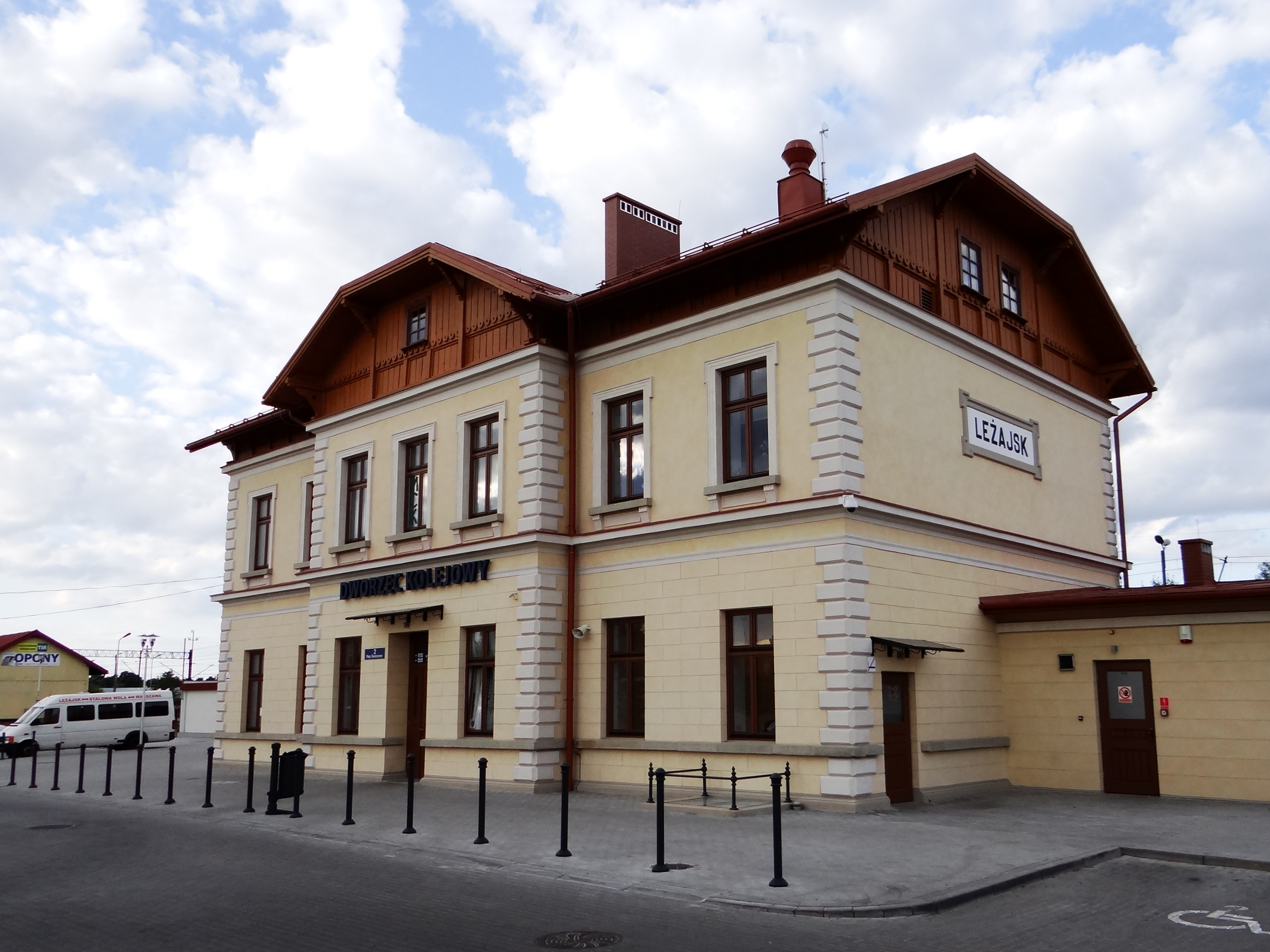
Railway station

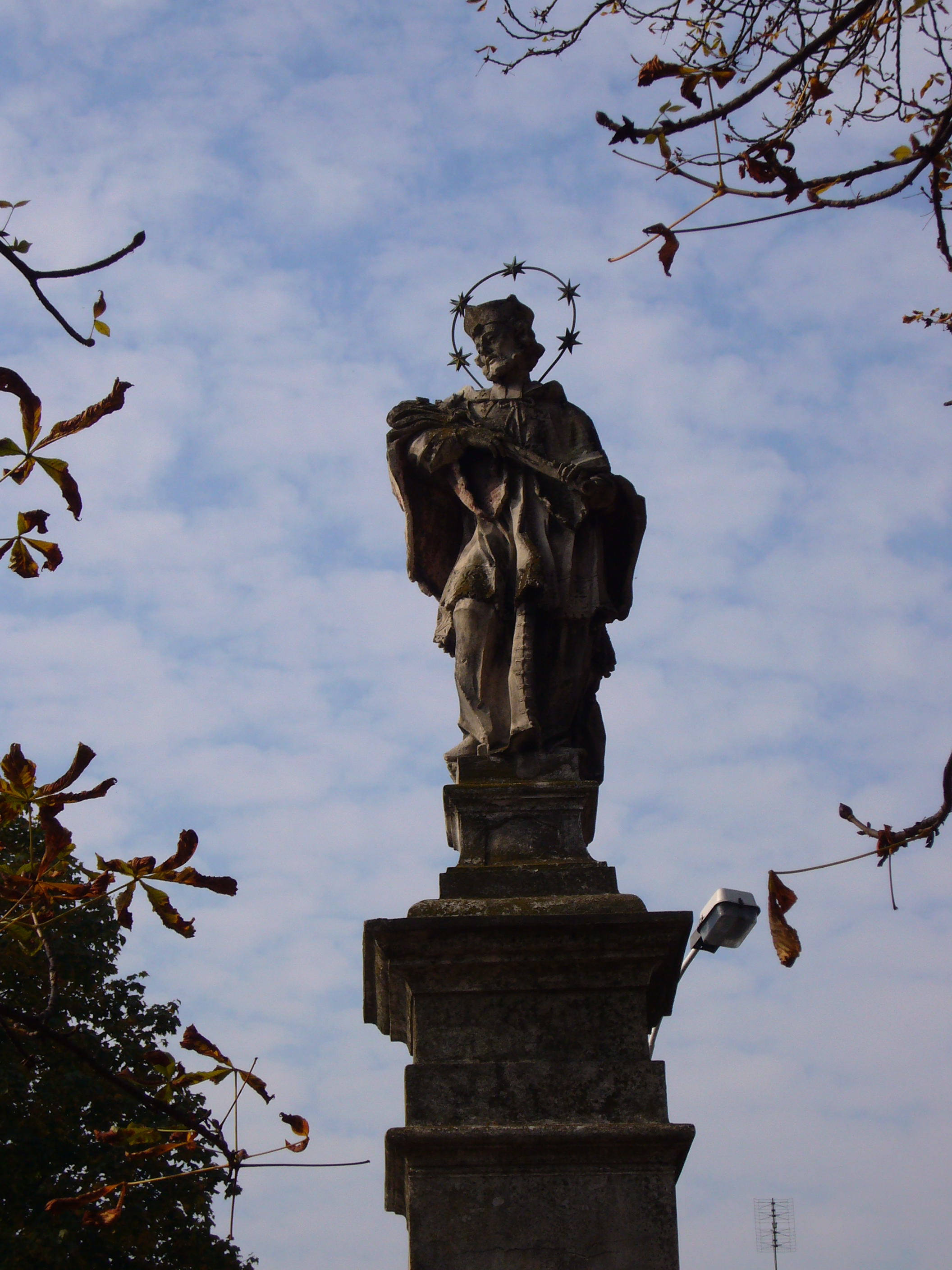
Baroque statue of Saint John of Nepomuk
