= Kuryłówka =

- Village
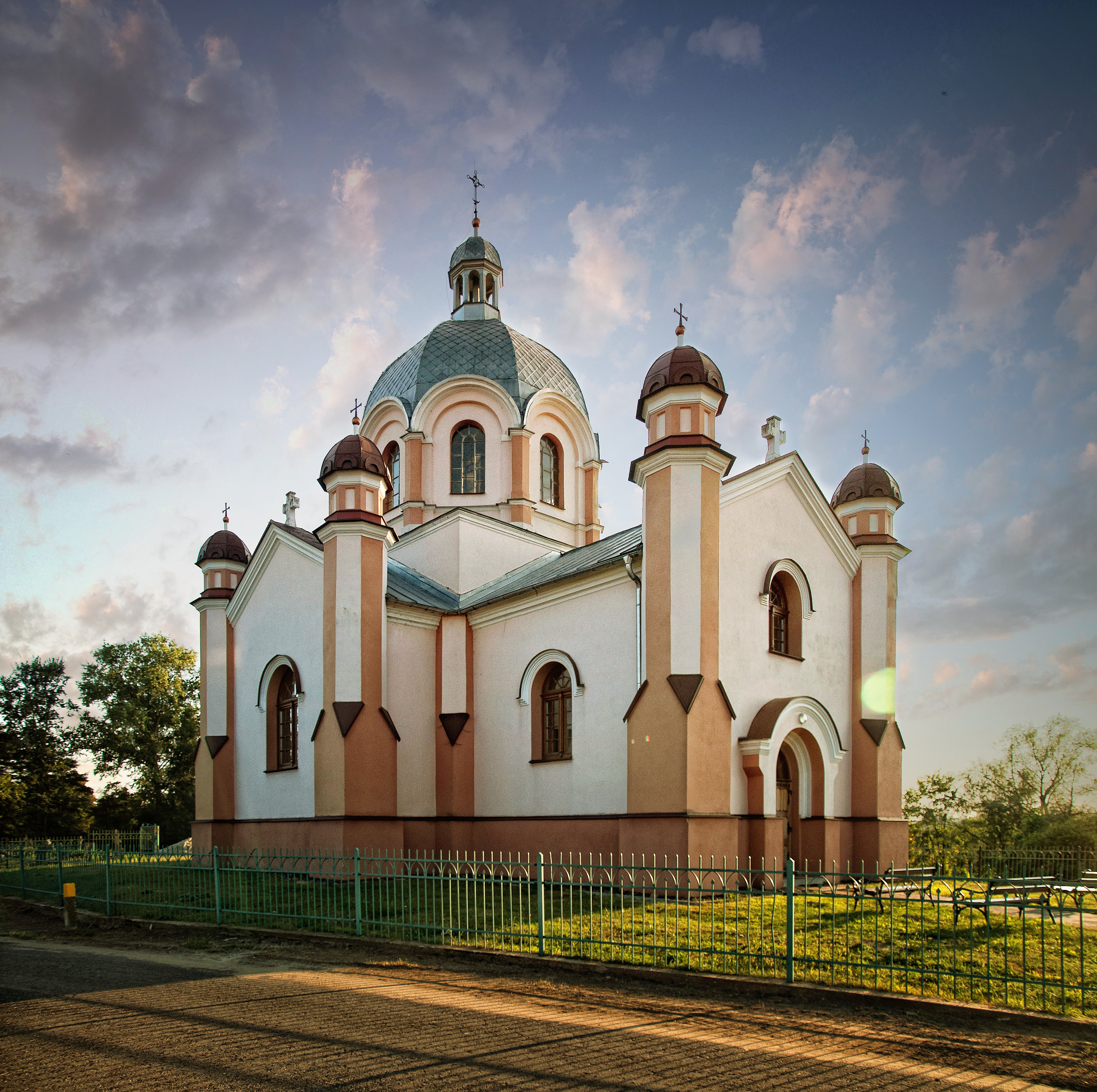
- Saint Nicholas church in Kuryłówka, formerly a Greek Catholic church built in 1896

- Location within Poland
- Coordinates: 50°17′50″N 22°27′53″E
- Country: Poland
- Voivodeship: Subcarpathian
- County: Leżajsk
- Gmina: Kuryłówka
- Population: 1,711

Kuryłówka [kurɨˈwufka] is a village in Leżajsk County, Subcarpathian Voivodeship, in south-eastern Poland. It is the seat of the gmina (administrative district) called Gmina Kuryłówka. The village is located in the historical region Galicia.

The village was first mentioned in 1515, although the settlement in this place already existed in Roman times. In 1978, Aleksandra Gruszczyńska from the District Museum in Rzeszów conducted archaeological research during which the remains of a settlement from the Roman period were discovered. June 29, 1944 invasion of Kalmyks. It was the site of anti-communist resistance after World War II (see: Battle of Kurylowka). In 2007 it was damaged by a waterspout.

As of 2021, the population is 1,747 people, which would make up 31.7% of the total population of the gmina.

== Transportation ==
Voivodeship road 877 passes through Kuryłówka and nearby settlements of Naklik, Kulno, Stare Miasto, Leżajsk. County road 1250R branches off of road 877, heading south and connecting the villages of Tarnawiec, Ożanna, Dąbrowica, Kolonia Polska, and Cieplice. County road 1246R branches off of road 877, heading east and connecting the villages of Brzyska Wola, Jastrzębiec, and the town Tarnogród.

Kuryłówka has a bus stop adjacent to the government office

== Government Services ==
Kuryłówka is the seat of Gmina Kuryłówka, where the government office is. It is located at Kuryłówka 527.

Along with the government office, Kuryłówka has a post office, social welfare center, primary school, cultural center (located inside the government office building), and library.

== Notable people ==
- Tomasz Czapla
- Janusz Dolny
- Roman Szczęsny
- Antoni Wyspiański

== See also ==
- Battle of Kuryłówka
- Gmina Kuryłówka
