= Nowa Sarzyna =

- Town

- Flag Coat of arms

- Location within Poland
- Coordinates: 50°19′20″N 22°19′7″E
- Country: Poland
- Voivodeship: Subcarpathian
- County: Leżajsk
- Gmina: Nowa Sarzyna

Government
  - Mayor: Andrezej Rychel (PiS)

Area
  - Total: 9.15 km^{2} (3.53 sq mi)

Population (2019)
  - Total: 6,000
  - Density: 660/km^{2} (1,700/sq mi)
- Time zone: UTC+1 (CET)
  - Summer (DST): UTC+2 (CEST)
- Postal code: 37-310
- Vehicle registration: RLE
- Website: www.nowasarzyna.eu

Nowa Sarzyna (Note: Polish: [ˈnɔva saˈʐɨna]; Ukrainian: Но́ва Сажи́на, romanized: Nóva Sazhýna) is a town in south-eastern Poland, in Leżajsk County in the Subcarpathian Voivodeship, with 5,970 inhabitants as of 2017.

The first buildings of Nowa Sarzyna were constructed in the late 1930s to house workers of a new chemical plant, built as part of Poland's Central Industrial Region. The town lies on land formerly belonging to the village Sarzyna. Town rights were granted in 1973. The chemical plant function as Zakłady Chemiczne "Organika-Sarzyna" S.A. and is the town's largest employing industry.

== History ==
=== Prehistory and medieval period ===
The area of the Nowa Sarzyna commune was covered by a forest, later known as the Sandomierz Forest. The first traces of settlement along the sandy banks of the San River date back to the Neolithic period (around 4500 BC), with early settlers being nomadic hunters. During the Bronze Age, the region was inhabited by Proto-Slavs associated with the Lusatian culture's Tarnobrzeg group. Roman-era coins found in Leżajsk suggest the existence of a trade route passing through the area.

Located in the territory of the old Polish tribe of the Lendians, the area became part of the emerging Duchy of Poland under Mieszko I in the 10th century. Later on, it was annexed the Kievan Rus', and then often passed between Poland and Rus' principalities. Settlement in the southeastern part of the Sandomierz Forest revived in the 14th and 15th centuries, coinciding with the development of a water trade route along the San River. Inhabitants were primarily of Ruthenian origin, and the region became a natural border between Poland and Ruthenia, leading to frequent disputes. A period of relative peace began in 1340, when Casimir III the Great reintegrated the area with Poland permanently. The area became part of royal estates, and German law was introduced for the establishment of service settlements, including Sarzyna, founded in 1390. According to tradition, 24 farmers were tasked with clearing and cultivating 100 acres of forest each. From 1433, Sarzyna was leased to Spytek I of Jarosław, the voivode of the Sandomierz Voivodeship. It then passed to his descendants from the Tarnowski family.

=== Modern period ===
The village's location in the forest influenced the occupations of its population, who were primarily engaged in forestry, beekeeping, and iron smelting. In 1565, iron production began in what is now Ruda Łańcucka, marking an early industrial activity in the area. The first church in Sarzyna was built in 1595, and a Roman Catholic parish was founded in 1598.

During the 16th and 17th centuries, Sarzyna faced repeated invasions. The first major attack was a Tatar invasion in 1524, followed by conflicts between local lords and the Tatars in the 17th century. These invasions severely impacted the local economy. After the First Partition of Poland in 1772, Sarzyna was annexed by Austria and became part of Galicia.

In the 19th century, Sarzyna's development was influenced by figures such as Father Marceli Śleczkowski, a parish priest who was a member of the Literary Society in Kraków and involved in the canonization of St. Józef Kuncewicz. In 1840, Baron Wilhelm Hompesch, an Austrian magnate, bought nearby Łętownia, and under his son Ferdynand, a railway line from Rozwadów to Przeworsk was constructed.

=== 20th century ===
The outbreak of World War I caused significant damage to Sarzyna, with the village suffering from fighting and fire. In November 1918, local residents disarmed the Austrians stationed in Ruda Łańcucka and took control of the post office and the train station. With the end of the war, Poland regained independence and control of the area. After the war, Sarzyna's residents faced economic challenges, with less fertile lands leading to the growth of basketry as a secondary industry. The area's development accelerated in 1937 with the construction of chemical plants as part of the Central Industrial District (COP), initiated by Deputy Minister Eugeniusz Kwiatkowski. However, this growth was interrupted by the outbreak of World War II.

During the German invasion of Poland at the start of World War II, German troops entered the factory on 13 September 1939, and then looted its equipment. The occupiers subjected the local populace to forced labour, and several inhabitants were executed. Resistance movements, such as the Home Army and Peasant Battalions, were active in the region. The Germans set up a weapons and ammunition depot at the factory. The Polish resistance seized some of the weapons and ammunition and later used them against the Germans during the Warsaw Uprising in 1944. In reprisal for resistance activities, the occupiers committed a massacre in the nearby village of Wola Żarczycka.

Following the war, Sarzyna's infrastructure was severely damaged, including the destruction of the factory and surrounding areas. After the Russian entry in July 1944, the factory was cleared of remnants of war, and management was eventually taken over by the Boruta Chemical Plant in Zgierz.

Shopping mall

== Notable people ==
- Damian Muskus (1967–), Polish bishop.
