= Gmina Nowa Sarzyna =

Gmina Nowa Sarzyna Nowa Sarzyna Commune
- Gmina
- Coat of arms
- Interactive map of Gmina Nowa Sarzyna
- Coordinates (Nowa Sarzyna): 50°19′20″N 22°19′7″E
- Country: Poland
- Voivodeship: Subcarpathian
- County: Leżajsk
- Seat: Nowa Sarzyna

Area
  - Total: 144.55 km^{2} (55.81 sq mi)

Population (2011)
  - Total: 21,840
  - Density: 151.1/km^{2} (391.3/sq mi)
  - Urban: 6,338
  - Rural: 15,502
- Website: http://www.nowasarzyna.pl/index.php

Gmina Nowa Sarzyna is an urban-rural gmina (administrative district) in Leżajsk County, Subcarpathian Voivodeship, in south-eastern Poland. Its seat is the town of Nowa Sarzyna, which lies approximately 11 kilometres (7 mi) north-west of Leżajsk and 40 km (25 mi) north-east of the regional capital Rzeszów.

The gmina covers an area of 144.55 square kilometres (55.8 sq mi), and as of 2006 its total population is 21,296 (out of which the population of Nowa Sarzyna amounts to 6,308, and the population of the rural part of the gmina is 14,988).

== Villages ==
Apart from the town of Nowa Sarzyna, Gmina Nowa Sarzyna contains the villages and settlements of Jelna, Jelna-Judaszówka, Łętownia, Łętownia-Gościniec, Łukowa, Majdan Łętowski, Ruda Łańcucka, Sarzyna, Tarnogóra, Wola Żarczycka and Wólka Łętowska.

== Neighbouring gminas ==
Gmina Nowa Sarzyna is bordered by the town of Leżajsk and by the gminas of Jeżowe, Kamień, Krzeszów, Leżajsk, Rudnik nad Sanem and Sokołów Małopolski.

== Notable people ==
- Stanisław Tołpa (1901–1996), Polish professor, botanist, and theologian.
- Witold Szczypiński (1955–), vice-president of the Management Board of Grupa Azoty S.A.
- Damian Muskus (1967–), Polish bishop.
- Gaspar Tochman (1797–1880), Polish-American lawyer and soldier.
