= Voivodeship road 877 =

Road in Poland

Coordinates: 50°40′59″N 22°40′42″E

Voivodeship Road 877
- Droga wojewódzka nr 877

Route information
- Length: 70 km (43 mi)

Major junctions
- From: Naklik
- To: Szklary

Location
- Country: Poland
- Regions: Lublin Voivodeship, Subcarpathian Voivodeship
- Major cities: Leżajsk, Łańcut

Highway system
- National roads in Poland; Voivodeship roads
← DW 876	→ DW 878

Voivodeship road 877 (Polish: droga wojewódzka nr 877) in Poland is a voivodeship road linking Naklik with Szklary.

== Important settlements along the Voivodeship road 877 ==
- Naklik (road 863)
- Kuryłówka
- Leżajsk (road 77), (road 875)
- Żołynia
- Wola Mała (highway A4)
- Łańcut (road 94), (road 881)
- Dylągówka (road 878)
- Szklary (road 835)

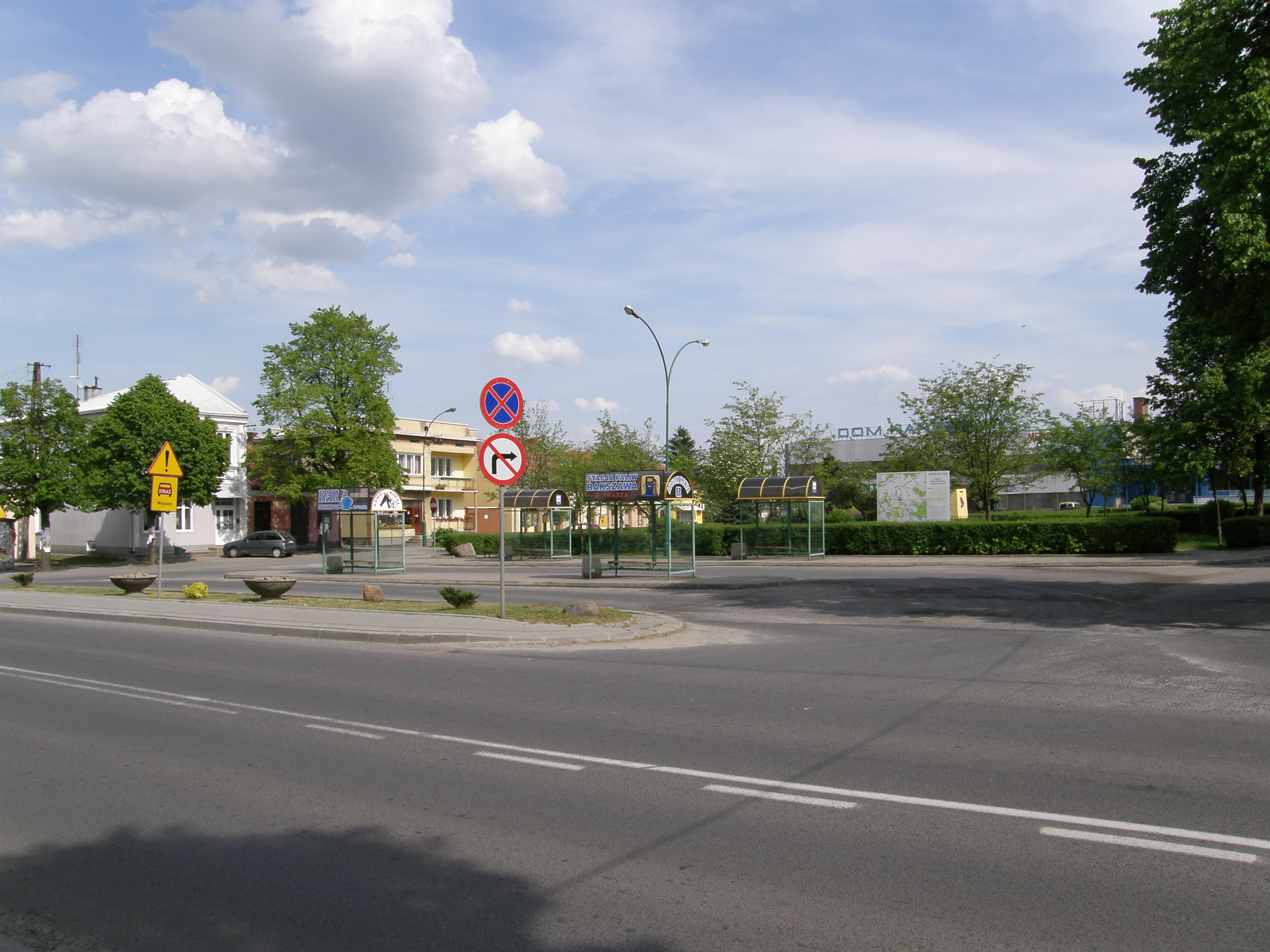
The Voivodeship road 877 in Żołynia.
