= Stanisław Stadnicki =

Polish nobleman (c. 1551–1610)

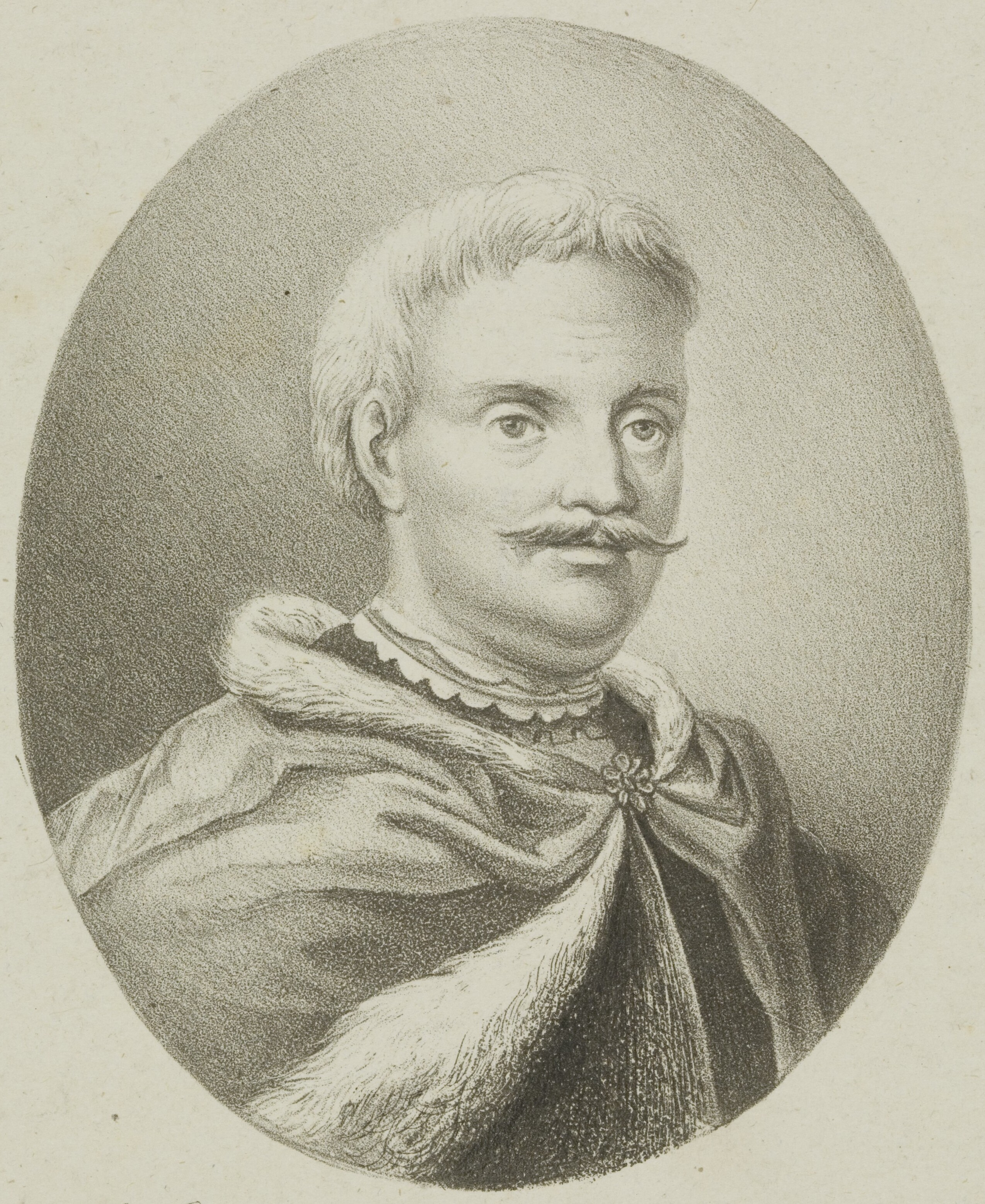
Stanisław Stadnicki, painted by Józef Sonntag

Stanisław Stadnicki (c. 1551 in Nowy Żmigród or Dubiecko – 1610 in Tarnawiec) was a Polish nobleman and the Lord Starosta of Żygwulsko (Sigulda). He was a known troublemaker, called 'the Devil of Łańcut' (Polish: diabeł łańcucki) for his violent behaviour. He was lord of the castle in Łańcut and an enemy of Jan Zamoyski, Grand Chancellor of the Crown, and in 1606 he became one of the leaders of the rokosz of Zebrzydowski. From his Łańcut castle he organised many assaults (zajazdy) at the estates of Łukasz Opaliński and Anna Ostrogska.

Stadnicki was married to Anna Stadnicka, the father of Zygmunt Stadnicki, Władysław Stadnicki, Stanisław Stadnicki (junior) and Felicjana Stadnicka. After his death, his family carried his tradition of trouble-making, with his wife earning the nickname of the Łańcut devil-woman and his sons, the Łancut devil-children.

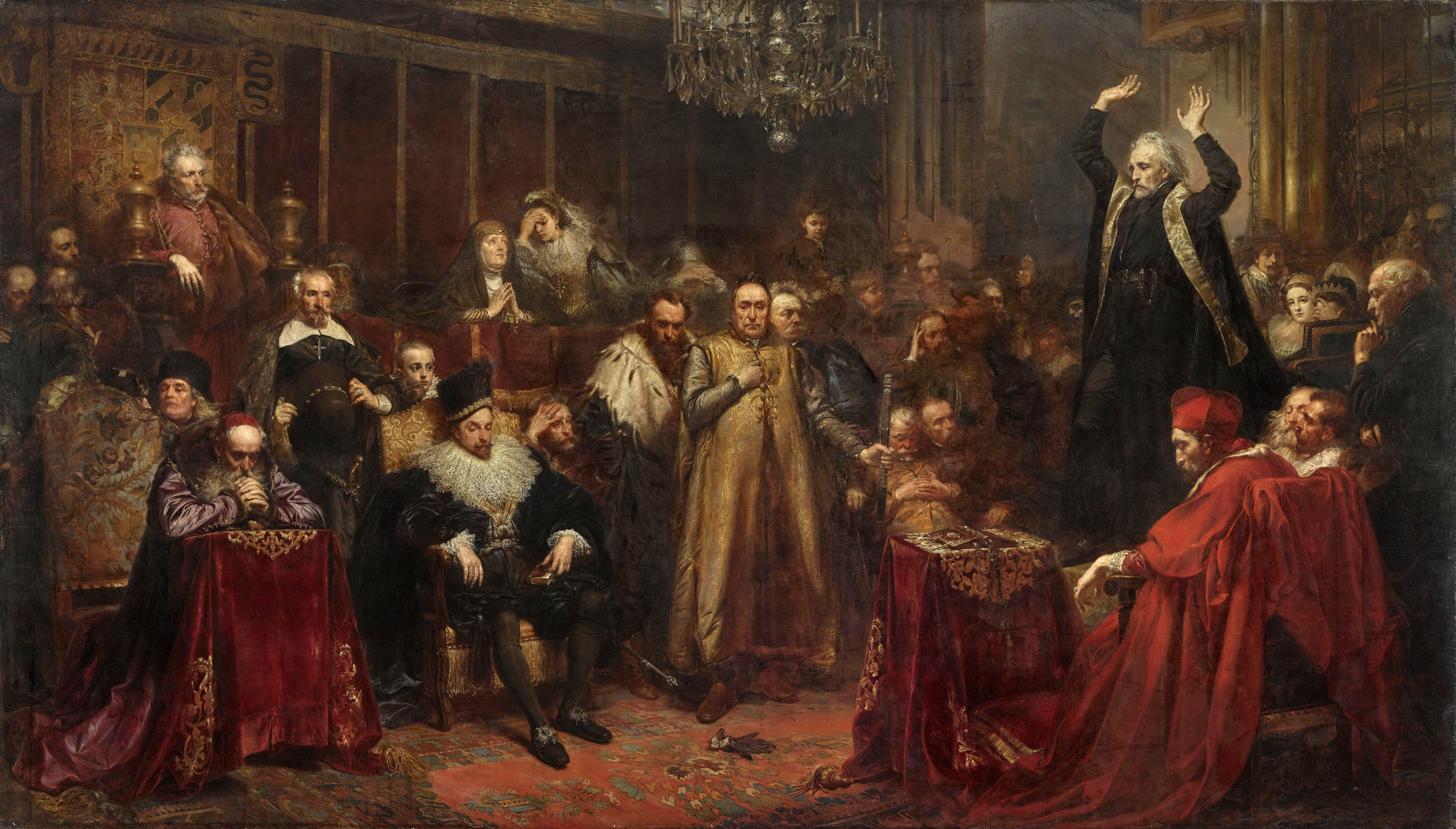
"Skarga's Sermon", a painting by Jan Matejko. Stadnicki is standing in the center, third from left.

He was killed on 20 August 1610, when he was confronted with an overwhelming force loyal to Łukasz Opaliński, and was unable to evade pursuit to return to his own men.

== Biography ==
He was the son of Stanisław Mateusz and Barbara née Zborowski, a Calvinist. His brother was Marcin Stadnicki h. Szreniawa (c. 1552-1628) Castellan Sanok, steward court of Tsaritsa Maryna Mniszech.

He was married to Anna Ziemięcka (from Ziemięcice near Gliwice) and had three sons with her: Władysław (killed in Krzemienica in 1610), Zygmunt and Stanisław, and one daughter - Felicjana. The Stadnicki family was Evangelical-Reformed (Calvinist) and held a church in Łańcut.

He is remembered as an adventurer and a famous brawler, called the "Devil of Łańcut". He earned this notoriety as a captain while taking part in Stefan Batory’s expedition to Gdańsk and Moscow. Offended that his exploits were underestimated, he left for Hungary, where he fought against the Ottoman Turksin the army of Emperor Rudolf II. Later he supported Archduke Maximilian in his efforts to obtain the Polish crown and for some time stayed in Silesia where he met his future wife Anna Ziemięcka while staying with her father. He took part on the Austrian side in the siege of the Olsztyn Castle near Częstochowa.

In 1586, he took over the city of Łańcut for debts from Anna Sienińska. During the election of 1587 he voted from the Krakow Province for Maksymilian Habsburg.

As a Protestant, and deputy to the Crown Tribunal in Lublin he was chosen as administrator by the Protestant-Orthodox confederation of Vilnius in 1599. He was a political opponent of Jan Zamoyski. In 1600, he was a member of the Sejm, and in 1606-1607 one of the leaders of the Zebrzydowski rebellion (he took part as one of the commanders in the battle of Guzów, which took place on July 5, 1607). Later, however, he unexpectedly changed sides and escaped with his army.

In 1603 Stadnicki attacked Konstanty Korniakt from Białobok to whom he owed a large fortune. He invaded the villages of Krzemienica, Czarna and Albigowa, which were pledged, plundered the peasants and burned the farms. During the invasion of Sośnica, Stadnicki plundered all the goods gathered there and captured Korniakt, whom he transported to Łańcut, keeping him in castle dungeons for half a year, until he and his mother and brother signed a settlement waiving their claim to damages from his invasion of Sośnica. During the court trial in Przeworsk, Stadnicki tried to kill two of Korniakt's legal advisors: Adam Żydowski and Andrzej Świdnicki, who escaped from the city.

He waged a private war against the starosta of Leżajsk, Łukasz Opaliński. Opaliński captured his residence in Łańcut together with the city in 1608. Stadnicki, however, in retaliation took Opaliński's residence together with the city of Leżajsk. Eventually near Tarnawiec, where 6,000 people were gathered, on August 14, 1610, he lost to Opaliński. He died in retreat after the battle, and with him about half a thousand of his soldiers. He had hid in the forest but when he carelessly leaned out from behind logs of wood he was noticed by the Cossacks. Stadnicki was finished by Tatar Persa. After his death, 10 wounds from punches and sword thrusts were calculated on his body. Opaliński regretted that Stadnicki was not taken alive, but he rewarded Persa, who received ennoblement and surname Macedoński at the next parliament.

== Stadnicki in art ==
Stanisław Stadnicki is one of the characters on the painting by Jan Matejko: Kazanie Skargi (The Sermon of Piotr Skarga).

He is the hero of the novel Diabeł Łańcucki (2007) by Jacek Komuda ,Under the Devil's Hoof (1983) by Kazimierz Korkozowicz , as well as the drama "Dragon's Nest" by Adolf Nowaczyński and the Zygwul Starost of Adam Krechowiecki . He is also the hero of one of the novellas (With the Devil case) in the Cases of old man Wolski by Józef Hen, filmed in the episode of the Knights and Robbers series. It is mentioned in the novels of the Manuscript of Mrs. Fabulicka (1958) of Hanna Januszewska and Golden Freedom (1928) by Zofia Kossak-Szczucka.

He is portrayed as an anti-hero in novels of writers such as Alexander Fredro, Władysław Syrokomla and Władysław Bełza. One of the antagonists of the titular hero of the Kacper Ryx series, whose author is Mariusz Wollny .
