= Łukowa, Podkarpackie Voivodeship =

Łukowa
- Village
- Location within Poland
- Coordinates: 50°19′34″N 22°22′17″E
- Country: Poland
- Voivodeship: Subcarpathian
- County: Leżajsk
- Gmina: Nowa Sarzyna
- Population: 610

Łukowa [wuˈkɔva] is a village in the administrative district of Gmina Nowa Sarzyna, within Leżajsk County, Subcarpathian Voivodeship, in south-eastern Poland.
