= Grodzisko Nowe =

- Village
- Location within Poland
- Coordinates: 50°9′N 22°30′E
- Country: Poland
- Voivodeship: Subcarpathian
- County: Leżajsk
- Gmina: Grodzisko Dolne

Grodzisko Nowe [ɡrɔˈd͡ʑiskɔ ˈnɔvɛ] is a village in the administrative district of Gmina Grodzisko Dolne, within Leżajsk County, Subcarpathian Voivodeship, in south-eastern Poland.
