= Podlesie, Leżajsk County =

Podlesie
- Village
- Location within Poland
- Coordinates: 50°9′33″N 22°25′10″E
- Country: Poland
- Voivodeship: Subcarpathian
- County: Leżajsk
- Gmina: Grodzisko Dolne

Podlesie [pɔdˈlɛɕɛ] is a village in the administrative district of Gmina Grodzisko Dolne, within Leżajsk County, Subcarpathian Voivodeship, in south-eastern Poland.
