= Kacper =

Kacper is a predominantly Polish masculine given name, a variant of Caspar. Notable people called Kacper include:

- Kacper Chorążka (born 1999), Polish footballer
- Kacper Denhoff (1587–1645), Baltic-German noble of the Holy Roman Empire; a noble of the Polish-Lithuanian Commonwealth; Governor of Dorpat Province
- Kacper Filipiak (born 1995), Polish former professional snooker player
- Kacper Gomolski (born 1993), Polish motorcycle speedway rider who rides for the Poole Pirates in the Elite League
- Kacper Koscierski (born 2007), German footballer
- Kacper Kosinski, member of The Analogs, a Polish street punk band
- Kacper Kozłowski (born 1986), Polish sprint athlete who specializes in the 400 metres
- Kacper Ławski (born 1985), Polish rugby player, second or third line of the lock in the French club CS Vienne
- Kacper Łazaj (born 1995), Polish footballer
- Kacper Majchrzak (born 1992), Polish swimmer
- Bronislaw Kacper Malinowski (1884–1942), Polish anthropologist
- Kacper Meyna (born 1999), Polish professional boxer
- Kacper Piechocki (born 1995), Polish volleyball player
- Kacper Piorun (born 1991), Polish chess grandmaster (2012)
- Kacper Pludra (born 2002), Polish motorcycle speedway rider
- Kacper Przybyłko (born 1993), Polish footballer
- Kacper Radkowski (born 2001), Polish footballer
- Kacper Sikora (born 1992), Polish singer who won the fourth series of Poland's Got Talent in 2011
- Kacper Sztuka (born 2006), Polish racing driver
- Kacper Tatara (born 1988), Polish footballer
- Kacper Tobiasz (born 2002), Polish footballer
- Kacper Tomasiak (born 2007), Polish ski jumper
- Kacper Urbański (born 2004), Polish footballer
- Kacper Wełniak (born 2000), Polish footballer
- Kacper Ziemiński (born 1990), Polish sailor

== See also ==
- Kacper Ryx, Polish historical crime novel written by Mariusz Wollny
- Kacperków
