= Majdan Łętowski =

- Village
- Location within Poland
- Coordinates: 50°20′4″N 22°15′50″E
- Country: Poland
- Voivodeship: Subcarpathian
- County: Leżajsk
- Gmina: Nowa Sarzyna
- Population: 803

Majdan Łętowski (Polish pronunciation: [ˈmajdan wɛnˈtɔfskʲi]) is a village in the administrative district of Gmina Nowa Sarzyna, within Leżajsk County, Subcarpathian Voivodeship, in south-eastern Poland.
