= Tarnogóra, Podkarpackie Voivodeship =

Tarnogóra
- Village
- Location within Poland
- Coordinates: 50°21′53″N 22°18′56″E
- Country: Poland
- Voivodeship: Subcarpathian
- County: Leżajsk
- Gmina: Nowa Sarzyna
- Population: 897

Tarnogóra [tarnɔˈɡura] is a village in the administrative district of Gmina Nowa Sarzyna, within Leżajsk County, Subcarpathian Voivodeship, in south-eastern Poland.
