= Łętownia-Gościniec =

- Village
- Location within Poland
- Coordinates: 50°19′53″N 22°20′06″E
- Country: Poland
- Voivodeship: Podkarpackie
- County: Leżajsk
- Gmina: Nowa Sarzyna
- Population: 592

Łętownia-Gościniec (Polish pronunciation: [wɛnˈtɔvɲa ɡɔɕˈt͡ɕiɲɛt͡s]) is a village in the administrative district of Gmina Nowa Sarzyna, within Leżajsk County, Podkarpackie Voivodeship, in south-eastern Poland.
