= Gmina Kuryłówka =

Gmina Kuryłówka Kuryłówka Commune
- Gmina
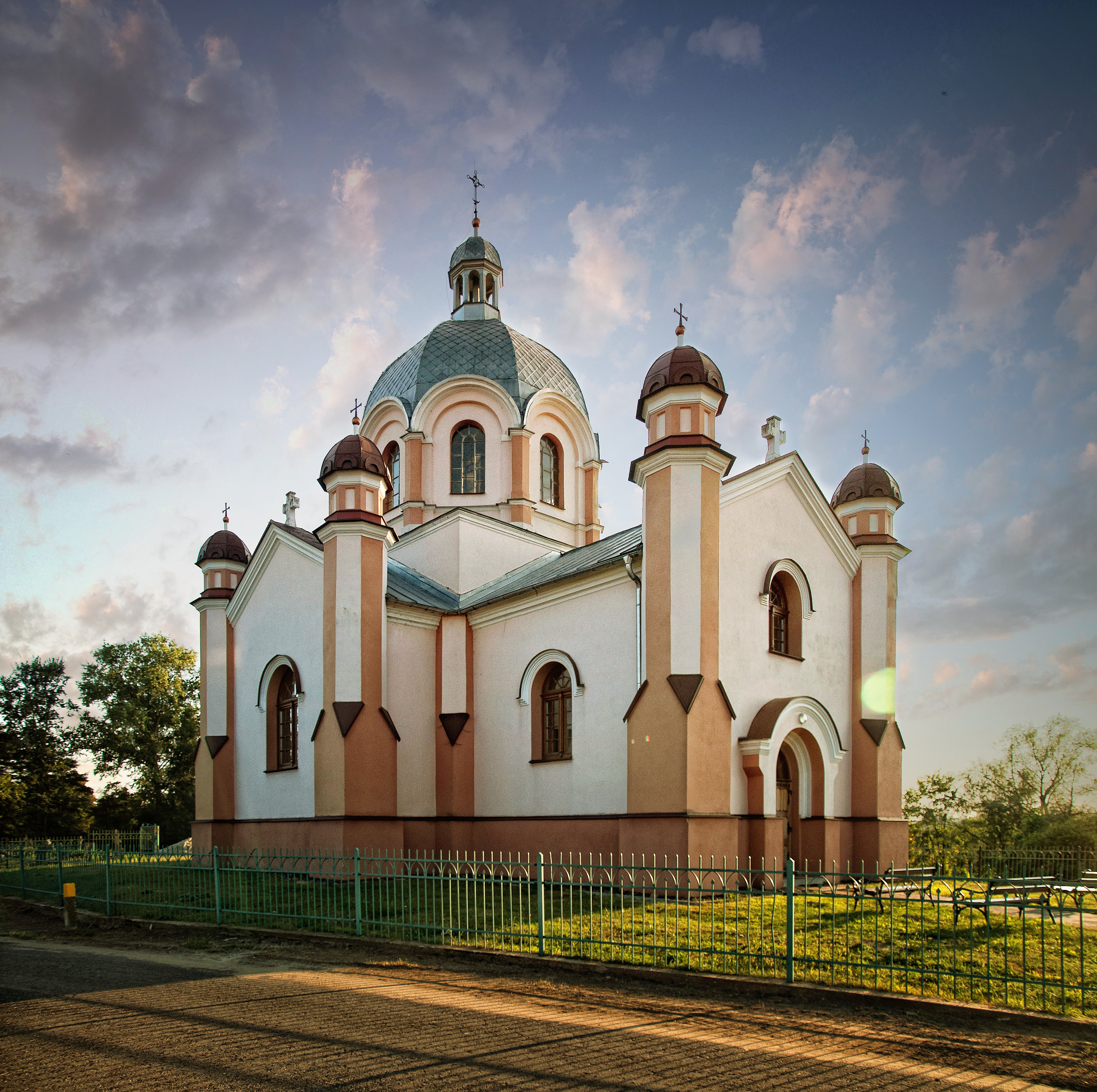
- Saint Nicholas church in Kuryłówka

- Coat of arms
- Interactive map of Gmina Kuryłówka
- Coordinates (Kuryłówka): 50°17′50″N 22°27′53″E
- Country: Poland
- Voivodeship: Subcarpathian
- County: Leżajsk
- Seat: Kuryłówka

Area
  - Total: 141.25 km^{2} (54.54 sq mi)

Population (2011)
  - Total: 5,733
  - Density: 40.59/km^{2} (105.1/sq mi)
- Website: https://www.kurylowka.pl/

Gmina Kuryłówka is a rural gmina (administrative district) in Leżajsk County, Subcarpathian Voivodeship, in south-eastern Poland. Its seat is the village of Kuryłówka, which lies approximately 5 kilometres (3 mi) northeast of Leżajsk and 44 km (27 mi) north-east of the regional capital Rzeszów.

The gmina covers an area of 141.25 square kilometres (54.5 sq mi). In 2006 its total population was 5,663, 5,733 in 2011, and 5,491 in 2024.

== Villages ==
Gmina Kuryłówka contains the villages and settlements of Brzyska Wola, Dąbrowica, Jastrzębiec, Kolonia Polska, Kulno, Kuryłówka, Ożanna, Słoboda, Tarnawiec and Wólka Łamana.

== Neighbouring gminas ==
Gmina Kuryłówka is bordered by the town of Leżajsk and by the gminas of Adamówka, Biszcza, Krzeszów, Leżajsk, Potok Górny and Tarnogród.

== Notable persons ==
- Moe Drabowsky, American major league baseball pitcher
