= Kasprowicz =

Kasprowicz is a Polish-language surname. It is a patronymic surname derived from the given name Kacper. Notable people with this surname include:

- Jan Kasprowicz (1860–1926), Polish poet, playwright, critic and translator
- Michael Kasprowicz (born 1972), Australian Test cricketer
- Simon Kasprowicz, Australian professional rugby union player
