= Łukasz Opaliński =

Łukasz Opaliński is the name of several Polish nobles:

- Łukasz Opaliński (1581–1654), castellan of Poznań
- Łukasz Opaliński (1612–1666), Polish poet, writer and political activist
