= Wólka Łętowska =

- Village
- Location within Poland
- Coordinates: 50°19′N 22°12′E
- Country: Poland
- Voivodeship: Subcarpathian
- County: Leżajsk
- Gmina: Nowa Sarzyna

Wólka Łętowska [ˈvulka wɛnˈtɔfska] is a village in the administrative district of Gmina Nowa Sarzyna, within Leżajsk County, Subcarpathian Voivodeship, in south-eastern Poland.
