= Wólka Łamana =

- Village
- Location within Poland
- Coordinates: 50°20′58″N 22°31′32″E
- Country: Poland
- Voivodeship: Subcarpathian
- County: Leżajsk
- Gmina: Kuryłówka
- Population: 210

Wólka Łamana [ˈvulka waˈmana] is a village in the administrative district of Gmina Kuryłówka, within Leżajsk County, Subcarpathian Voivodeship, in south-eastern Poland.
