= Wólka Grodziska, Podkarpackie Voivodeship =

Wólka Grodziska
- Village
- Location within Poland
- Coordinates: 50°11′16″N 22°24′7″E
- Country: Poland
- Voivodeship: Subcarpathian
- County: Leżajsk
- Gmina: Grodzisko Dolne

Wólka Grodziska [ˈvulka ɡrɔˈd͡ʑiska] is a village in the administrative district of Gmina Grodzisko Dolne, within Leżajsk County, Subcarpathian Voivodeship, in south-eastern Poland.
