= Jelna-Judaszówka =

- Village
- Location within Poland
- Coordinates: 50°18′15″N 22°18′59″E
- Country: Poland
- Voivodeship: Subcarpathian
- County: Leżajsk
- Gmina: Nowa Sarzyna
- Population: 354

Jelna-Judaszówka [ˈjɛlna judaˈʂufka] is a village in the administrative district of Gmina Nowa Sarzyna, within Leżajsk County, Subcarpathian Voivodeship, in south-eastern Poland.
