= Złota (river) =

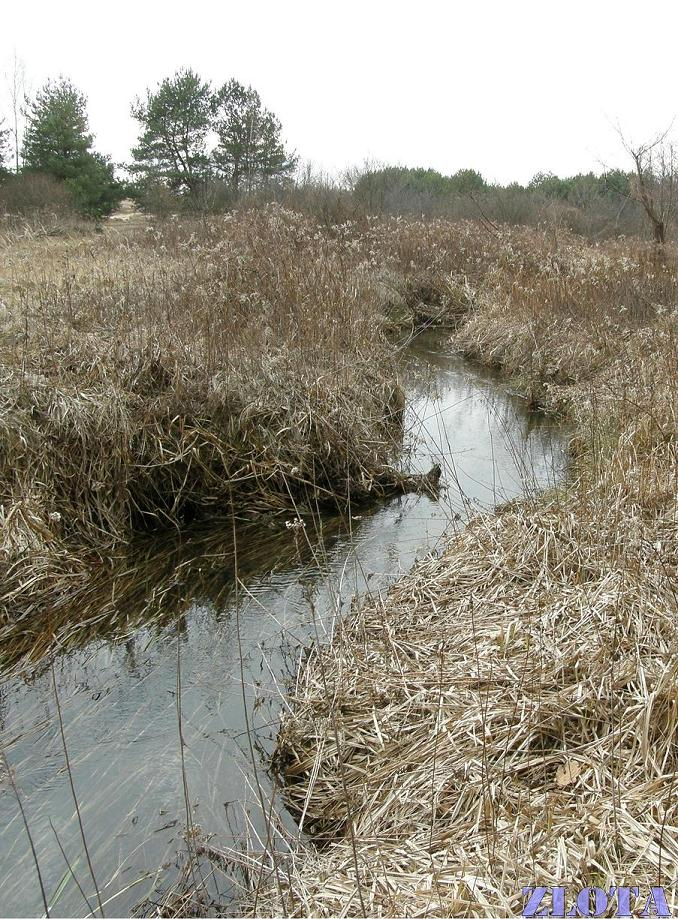

Location
- Country: Poland

Physical characteristics
- Mouth
  - location: San
  - coordinates: 50°18′02″N 22°27′08″E

Basin features
- Progression: San→ Vistula→ Baltic Sea

Złota is a river of Poland, a right-bank tributary of the San, which it meets in the south-eastern village of Kuryłówka.

== Amenities ==
Near the village of Ożanna a small reservoir (Zalew Ożanna) was created which is surrounded by tourist accommodation and a camping site. As of 2021 it was the subject of a study to establish if aeration treatment can alleviate its pollution levels.

== Złota stream ==
There is a second, smaller Złota which also drains into the San approximately 3 km north of this river's mouth after passing through the village of Kulno.
