= Grodzisko-Miasteczko =

- Village
- Location within Poland
- Coordinates: 50°10′00″N 22°26′00″E
- Country: Poland
- Voivodeship: Subcarpathian
- County: Leżajsk
- Gmina: Grodzisko Dolne

Grodzisko-Miasteczko [ɡrɔˈd͡ʑiskɔ mʲasˈtɛt͡ʂkɔ] is a village in the administrative district of Gmina Grodzisko Dolne, within Leżajsk County, Subcarpathian Voivodeship, in south-eastern Poland.
