= Zmysłówka, Leżajsk County =

Zmysłówka
- Village
- Location within Poland
- Coordinates: 50°10′N 22°22′E
- Country: Poland
- Voivodeship: Subcarpathian
- County: Leżajsk
- Gmina: Grodzisko Dolne
- Area: 1,510 ha (3,700 acres)
- Highest elevation: 264 m (866 ft)
- Lowest elevation: 181 m (594 ft)
- Population: 606
  - Density: 40.1/km^{2} (104/sq mi)

Zmysłówka [zmɨˈswufka] is a village in the administrative district of Gmina Grodzisko Dolne, within Leżajsk County, Subcarpathian Voivodeship, in south-eastern Poland.

== History ==
Zmysłówka was established in the 18th century. It belonged to the Przeworsk estate of the Lubomirski family, and later to the estate of the Potocki family of Łańcut.

In 1921 there were 103 houses in Zmysłówka.

In Zmysłówka there is a wooden Catholic church dedicated to St. Joseph, built in 1982. It is the parish church of St. Joseph Parish in Zmysłówka, while it was previously under the Grodzisko Dolne Parish. The current parish priest in 2019 decided to build a new brick church.

== Geography ==
Zmysłówkais located in a hilly lowland area, in the Subcarpathian Basins (to be precise - in the region of the Sandomierska Basin). It is located on the Kolbuszowa Plateau, which makes it much higher than the surrounding towns - Grodzisko Górne and Dolne (190 meters above sea level), Zołynia (210 meters above sea level) and Lezajsk (180 meters above sea level), and its highest point is 264 meters above sea level.

== Notable people ==
- Emil Polit - painter (1940–2024)
- gen. bryg. Witold Eugeniusz Sawicki - colonel of cavalry of the Polish Armed Forces (1896–1979)
