= Jelna, Podkarpackie Voivodeship =

Jelna
- Village
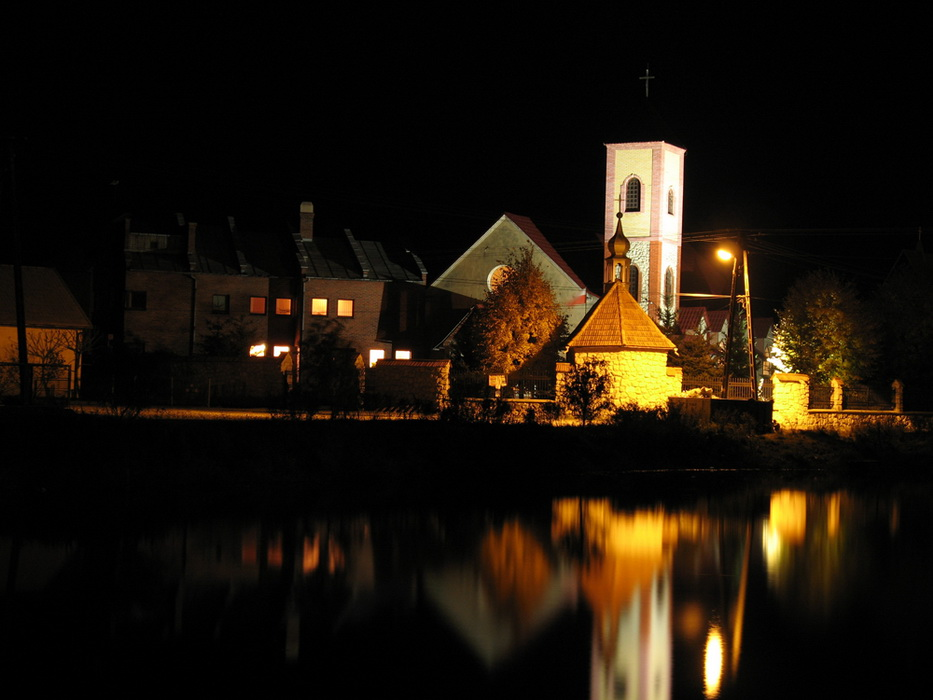
- Catholic church

- Location within Poland
- Coordinates: 50°17′45″N 22°21′15″E
- Country: Poland
- Voivodeship: Subcarpathian
- County: Leżajsk
- Gmina: Nowa Sarzyna
- Population: 1,900

Jelna [ˈjɛlna] is a village in the administrative district of Gmina Nowa Sarzyna, within Leżajsk County, Subcarpathian Voivodeship, in south-eastern Poland.
