= Jastrzębiec, Podkarpackie Voivodeship =

Jastrzębiec
- Village
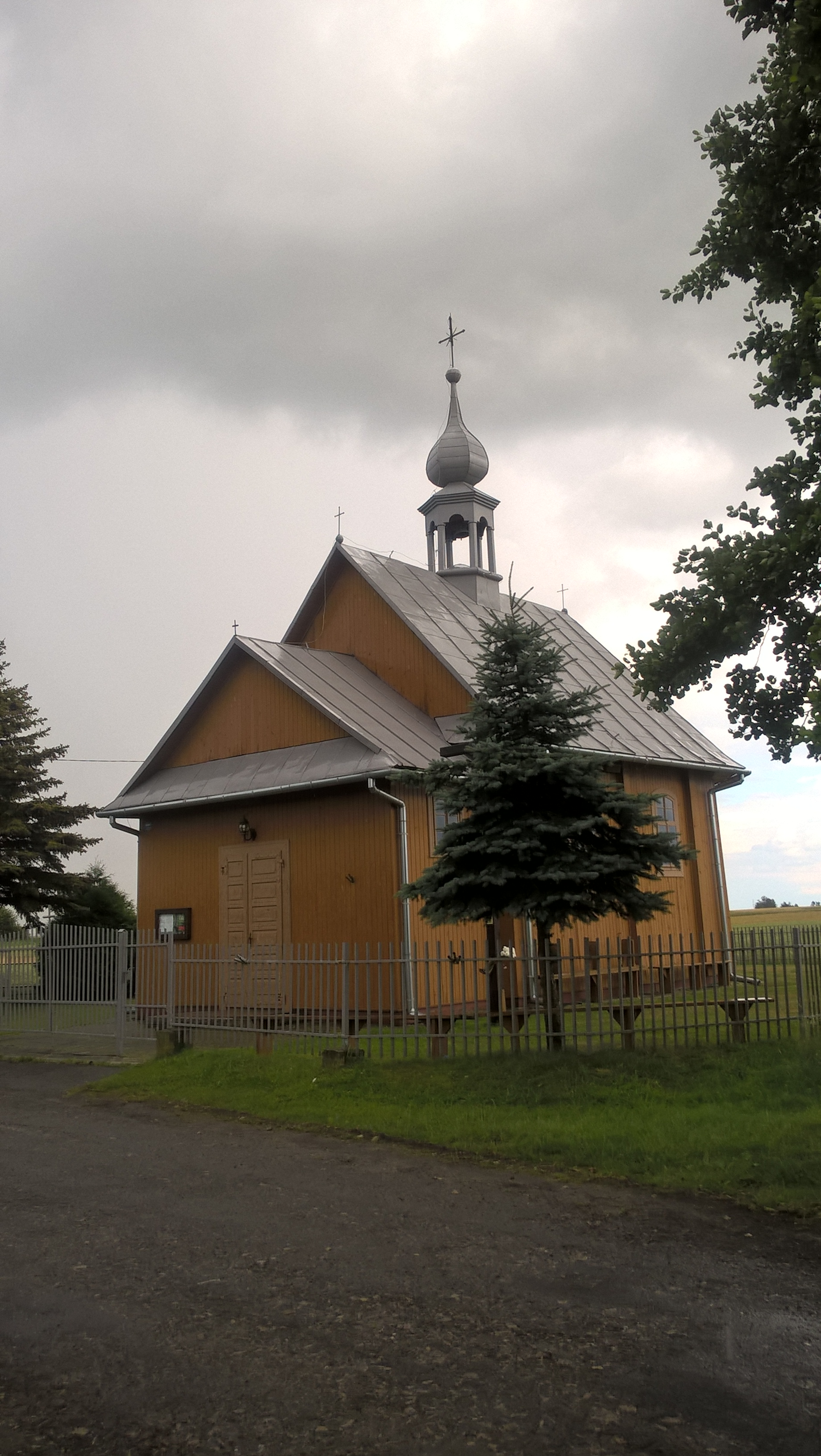

- Location within Poland
- Coordinates: 50°20′46″N 22°39′23″E
- Country: Poland
- Voivodeship: Subcarpathian
- County: Leżajsk
- Gmina: Kuryłówka
- Population: 290

Jastrzębiec [jasˈtʂɛmbʲɛt͡s] is a village in the administrative district of Gmina Kuryłówka, within Leżajsk County, Subcarpathian Voivodeship, in south-eastern Poland.
