= Emil Polit =

Polish painter (1940–2024)

- Born: 11 October 1940; Zmysłówka, General Government (now Poland)
- Died: 4 January 2024 (aged 83)
- Education: The Academy of Fine Arts (MA, 1965)
- Occupation: Painter
- Years active: 1959–2024
- Known for: Interior design of the Cathedral of the Sacred Heart of Jesus and other religious and secular works

Emil Polit (11 October 1940 – 4 January 2024) was a Polish painter known for his works on canvas and church murals. He was a portrait artist and painter of religious works which are exhibited in many churches in Poland and held in numerous collections including at the National Museum of Przemyśl, Art Exhibitions Bureau's Exhibition Center in Rzeszów, and at the Vatican.

== Early life and education ==
Emil Polit was born on 11 October 1940, in Zmysłówka, Poland. In 1954, he began attending the Fine Arts Preparatory Academy in Jarosław. From 1959, he studied at The Academy of Fine Arts in Krakow where he trained under Polish artist Wacław Taranczewski. Polit graduated with a Master of Fine Arts in painting and lithography in 1965.

== Career ==
After graduate school, Polit settled in Rzeszów, Poland, where he was inducted into the Polish Professional Artists' Association in 1966.

In 1988, Polit began teaching at State Secondary School of Fine Arts in Rzeszów. Polit served as an artistic painting and drawing teacher until his retirement in 2006. He also served there as the chair of the art department for a number of years. He was also the director of the local chapter of the Polish Professional Artists' Association (Związek Polskich Artystów Plastyków) from 1989 to 1991.

Polit's support for his community included donating to a number of organizations through annual art auctions. Some of the more notable events are the Polish Contemporary Art Auctions coordinated through the Polish Consulate in New York City and his Indianapolis exhibits supporting public television. Others are donations to benefit the St. Albert Society in Rzeszów, where he was awarded in 2002 with the Society's recognition award for exceptional generosity and his continuing support for Children's Hospice charities of Southeastern Poland. Polit also actively supports the Catholic Charities of the Rzeszów region and other local charities.

== Death ==
Polit died on 4 January 2024, at the age of 83.

== Works ==
Polit initially focused on industrial art design in parallel with his lifelong pursuit of painting and drawing. Later, he transitioned to painting full-time. Among his works are the interior design of the Cathedral of the Sacred Heart of Jesus of Roman Catholic Diocese of Rzeszów. He designed the altar and also painted the large frescos that adorned the church's interior walls, including murals of Jesus and patron saints of the diocese, Józef Sebastian Pelczar and Karolina Kózka. Also at the cathedral is Polit's rendition of the Stations of the Cross, a traditional series of images depicting Jesus on the day of his crucifixion.

Polit's religious works can also be found in Rzeszów, Matysówka, Trzebownisko, Nowa Dęba, Sonina, Rogóżno, and Łukawiec. His secular works often draw inspiration from his personal life. He often painted self-portraits as well as portraits of his friends and family including his wife, sons and grandchildren. His portraits are depicted in intimate scenes and in a highly stylized form unique to the artist.

== Awards ==
In 1996, Polit received the Rzeszów Heritage Award for contributions to "shaping and developing the region's art environment". In 2003, he was named as the National Art Educator for his contributions to art education in Poland, and in 2024 was awarded the Golden Cross of Merit by the President of the Republic of Poland, Andrzej Duda, for his achievements in artistic and creative activities.

== Exhibitions ==
Polit's work has been shown at more than 20 individual exhibitions, including:

- 1980 – W. Siemaszkowa Theater, Rzeszów
- 1981 and 1983 – Fine Art Studio, Holyoke, Massachusetts
- 1984 – Polish Culture Festival, Springfield, Massachusetts
- 2004 – Masterpiece Gallery, Indianapolis, Indiana
- 1994 – Zamek Romantyczny, Łańcut
- 1995 – Jubilee Painting Exhibition, Art Exhibitions Bureau, Rzeszów
- 1997 – Galeria 13, Rzeszów
- 1998 – Katedra, Sala Papieska, Rzeszów
- 1999 – Muzeum Diecezjalne. Rzeszów
- 2000 – Galeria Sztuki Współczesnej, Przemyśl
- 2001 – Galeria w Podwórzu, Rzeszów
- 2004 – Masterpiece Gallery, Indianapolis
- 2005 – Diocese Museum, Rzeszów
- 2005 – 40th Anniversary Exhibit, Art Exhibitions Bureau, Rzeszów
- 2006 – Masterpiece Gallery, Indianapolis
- 2008 – Masterpiece Gallery, Indianapolis
