= Wola Żarczycka =

- Village
- Church of the Transfiguration in Wola Żarczycka

- Location within Poland
- Coordinates: 50°18′N 22°15′E
- Country: Poland
- Voivodeship: Subcarpathian
- County: Leżajsk
- Gmina: Nowa Sarzyna

Population
  - Total: 3,793
- Time zone: UTC+1 (CET)
  - Summer (DST): UTC+2 (CEST)
- Vehicle registration: RLE

Wola Żarczycka [ˈvɔla ʐarˈt͡ʂɨt͡ska] is a village in the administrative district of Gmina Nowa Sarzyna, within Leżajsk County, Subcarpathian Voivodeship, in south-eastern Poland.
