= Kolonia Polska =

- Village
- Location within Poland
- Coordinates: 50°16′N 22°35′E
- Country: Poland
- Voivodeship: Subcarpathian
- County: Leżajsk
- Gmina: Kuryłówka
- Population: 310
- Website: www.pogonlezajsk.blog.onet.pl

Kolonia Polska [kɔˈlɔɲa ˈpɔlska] is a village in the administrative district of Gmina Kuryłówka, within Leżajsk County, Subcarpathian Voivodeship, in south-eastern Poland.
