= Ożanna, Podkarpackie Voivodeship =

Ożanna
- Village
- Location within Poland
- Coordinates: 50°17′17″N 22°31′30″E
- Country: Poland
- Voivodeship: Subcarpathian
- County: Leżajsk
- Gmina: Kuryłówka

Population
  - Total: 350
- Time zone: UTC+1 (CET)
  - Summer (DST): UTC+2 (CEST)
- Vehicle registration: RLE

Ożanna [ɔˈʐanːa] is a village in the administrative district of Gmina Kuryłówka, within Leżajsk County, Subcarpathian Voivodeship, in south-eastern Poland.

The Złota river flows through the village. A small reservoir (Zalew Ożanna) has been created on the river which is surrounded by tourist accommodation and a camping site.

Three Polish citizens were murdered by Nazi Germany in Ożanna and four in the adjacent settlement of Ożanna Wielka during World War II.

== Notable persons ==
- Moe Drabowsky, American Major League baseball player who fled with his family as Hitler came to power
