= Grodzisko Dolne =

- Village
- Location within Poland
- Coordinates: 50°9′42″N 22°27′50″E
- Country: Poland
- Voivodeship: Subcarpathian
- County: Leżajsk
- Gmina: Grodzisko Dolne
- Website: http://www.grodziskodolne.pl/

Grodzisko Dolne [ɡrɔˈd͡ʑiskɔ ˈdɔlnɛ] is a village in Leżajsk County, Subcarpathian Voivodeship, in south-eastern Poland. It is the seat of the gmina (administrative district) called Gmina Grodzisko Dolne.
