= Gmina Grodzisko Dolne =

Gmina Grodzisko Dolne Grodzisko Dolne Commune
- Gmina
- Interactive map of Gmina Grodzisko Dolne
- Coordinates (Grodzisko Dolne): 50°9′42″N 22°27′50″E
- Country: Poland
- Voivodeship: Subcarpathian
- County: Leżajsk
- Seat: Grodzisko Dolne

Area
  - Total: 78.42 km^{2} (30.28 sq mi)

Population (2011)
  - Total: 8,099
  - Density: 103.3/km^{2} (267.5/sq mi)
- Website: http://www.grodziskodolne.pl/

Gmina Grodzisko Dolne is a rural gmina (administrative district) in Leżajsk County, Subcarpathian Voivodeship, in south-eastern Poland. Its seat is the village of Grodzisko Dolne, which lies approximately 12 kilometres (7 mi) south of Leżajsk and 36 km (22 mi) north-east of the regional capital Rzeszów.

The gmina covers an area of 78.42 square kilometres (30.3 sq mi), and as of 2006 its total population is 8,169 (8,099 in 2011).

== Villages ==
Gmina Grodzisko Dolne contains the villages and settlements of Chodaczów, Grodzisko Dolne, Grodzisko Górne, Grodzisko Nowe, Grodzisko-Miasteczko, Laszczyny, Opaleniska, Podlesie, Wólka Grodziska and Zmysłówka.

== Neighbouring gminas ==
Gmina Grodzisko Dolne is bordered by the gminas of Białobrzegi, Leżajsk, Tryńcza and Żołynia.
