= Dąbrowica, Leżajsk County =

Dąbrowica
- Village
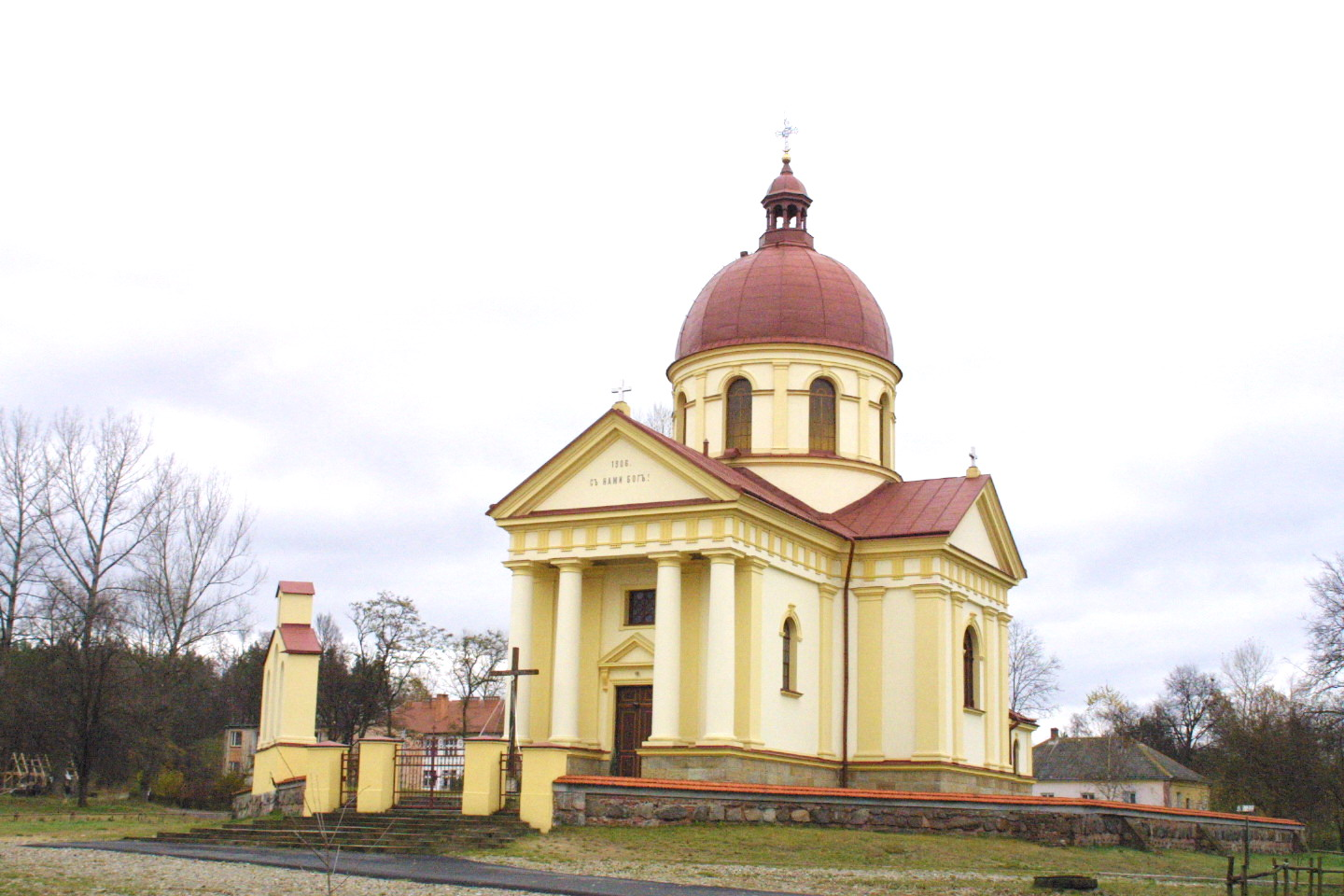
- Saint Michael Archangel church in Dąbrowica

- Location within Poland
- Coordinates: 50°17′23″N 22°33′22″E
- Country: Poland
- Voivodeship: Subcarpathian
- County: Leżajsk
- Gmina: Kuryłówka
- Population: 650

Dąbrowica [dɔmbrɔˈvʲit͡sa] is a village in the administrative district of Gmina Kuryłówka, within Leżajsk County, Subcarpathian Voivodeship, in south-eastern Poland.
