= Łętownia, Leżajsk County =

Łętownia
- Village
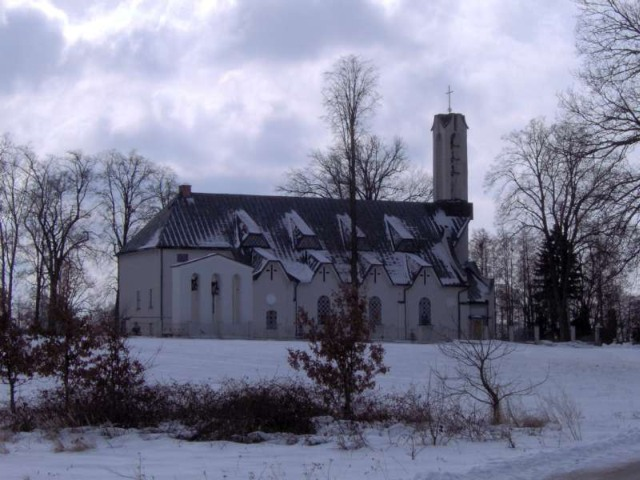
- Church of Saint Catherine

- Location within Poland
- Coordinates: 50°19′30″N 22°14′0″E
- Country: Poland
- Voivodeship: Subcarpathian
- County: Leżajsk
- Gmina: Nowa Sarzyna

Population
  - Total: 1,450
- Website: http://naszaletownia.republika.pl

Łętownia [wɛnˈtɔvɲa] is a village in the administrative district of Gmina Nowa Sarzyna, within Leżajsk County, Subcarpathian Voivodeship, in south-eastern Poland.

== Notable people ==
- Gaspar Tochman (1797–1880), Polish-American lawyer and soldier.
