= Appolonia Jagiello =

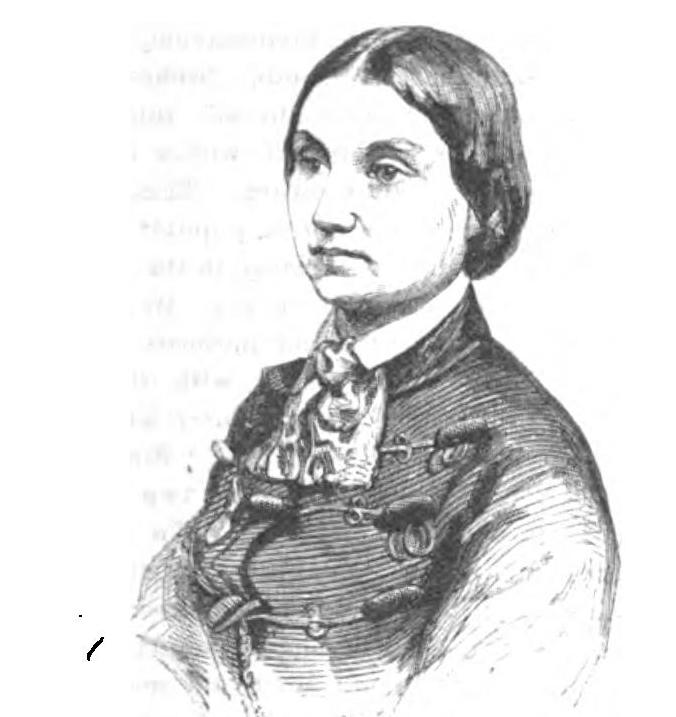
- Born: 1825; Congress Poland, Russian Empire
- Died: 1866 (aged 40–41); Alexandria, Virginia
- Occupations: Revolutionary, activist

Appolonia Jagiello, also known as Appolonia Jagiello Tochman, (1825 – 1866) was a Polish-Lithuanian American revolutionary and activist. She is most notable for her direct participation in the 1846 Kraków uprising, the Hungarian Revolution, and for her tangential involvement in the American Civil War.

== Biography ==
Appolonia Jagiello was born in Poland in 1825. Much of her early life is unknown, or was romanticized following her eventually immigration to the United States. According to one source, Appolonia was born in Lithuania (then part of the Polish–Lithuanian Commonwealth) and was educated in Krakow. During the Kraków uprising of 1846, she disguised herself as a man and joined the Polish army. The uprising was eventually crushed by the combined powers of Austria and Russia, but Jagiello was able to re-assume female dress and escape. Jagiello made her way to Hungary after the conflict and took part in the Hungarian Revolution of 1848, again fighting against the Austrian Empire. During the conflict, she was eventually promoted to be the superintendent of a military hospital at the Fortress of Komárno, which the revolutionary army had captured. When the revolution was suppressed by the Austrians, Jagiello immigrated to the United States, joining a large number of Polish, Lithuanian and Hungarian emigres who had also fled Europe.

Upon arriving in the United States, Appolonia's exploits gained her notoriety, with the American press—which sometimes incorrectly identified her as Hungarian - interviewing her several times. Swept up in what one source describes as "Hungarian Fever", the press embellished some of Appolonia's exploits, an outcome which embittered some of the other Hungarian emigres. However, when one Hungarian immigrant questioned her account, sixty seven former Hungarian soldiers vouched for her account, including seven soldiers who had served at Komarno. Still in the press spotlight, she travelled to Washington D.C and met with President Zachary Taylor and future President Millard Fillmore. After a tour of New York and Philadelphia, however, she was asked by Hungarian community leaders to retire from public life out of a concern that her fame was overshadowing the ideologies the immigrant community was trying to express to the American public. She agreed to the request and kept a low national profile, but remained an influential figure in the Polish-Lithuanian community in Washington. Her media spotlight had some effects on American populace; some (most notably Loreta Janeta Velázquez, who would later claim to have dressed as a man to fight in the American Civil War) saw her as being a symbol of female resiliency during war and were determined to follow her example.

In 1851, she married Gaspard Tochman in Harper's Ferry, Virginia. Tochman was likewise a émigré from Poland and ran a successful law practice in Washington, D.C. The couple's wedding was covered by the American and British press. The new couple owned a residence in Alexandria, but also spent time on a farm they purchased in Spotsylvania, Virginia.

With the outbreak of the American Civil War in 1861, Gaspard - a supporter of the Confederacy - left Virginia for Louisiana, where he hoped to raise troops for the Confederate army. Appolonia, however, remained loyal to the Union and so remained in Virginia, moving from Spotsylvania to Alexandria. Alexandria had been occupied by the federal government shortly after the war began; soon after her arrival in the city, Appolonia was detained by a Federal provost marshal, who suspected her of being a Confederate sympathizer. Appolonia was released from Federal custody several weeks later after she affirmed her loyalty to the Union - however, her residence was reportedly ransacked, her correspondence seized, and she herself was placed under surveillance.

Appolonia died in 1866 in Alexandria.
