= Sarzyna =

- Village

- Location within Poland
- Coordinates: 50°21′N 22°21′E
- Country: Poland
- Voivodeship: Subcarpathian
- County: Leżajsk
- Gmina: Nowa Sarzyna
- Population: 3,837
- Time zone: UTC+1 (CET)
  - Summer (DST): UTC+2 (CEST)
- Vehicle registration: RLE

Sarzyna (Polish pronunciation: [saˈʐɨna]) is a village in the administrative district of Gmina Nowa Sarzyna, within Leżajsk County, Subcarpathian Voivodeship, in south-eastern Poland.

== Notable people ==
- Witold Szczypiński (1955–), vice-president of the Management Board of Grupa Azoty S.A.
