= Ruda Łańcucka =

- Village
- Our Lady Queen of Poland church in Ruda Łańcucka

- Location within Poland
- Coordinates: 50°19′19″N 22°20′50″E
- Country: Poland
- Voivodeship: Subcarpathian
- County: Leżajsk
- Gmina: Nowa Sarzyna

Population
  - Total: 823
- Time zone: UTC+1 (CET)
  - Summer (DST): UTC+2 (CEST)
- Vehicle registration: RLE

Ruda Łańcucka (Polish pronunciation: [ˈruda waj̃ˈt͡sut͡ska]) is a village in the administrative district of Gmina Nowa Sarzyna, within Leżajsk County, Subcarpathian Voivodeship, in south-eastern Poland.

== Notable people ==
- Stanisław Tołpa (1901–1996), Polish professor, botanist, and theologian.
