= Kacper Ławski =

Polish rugby union player

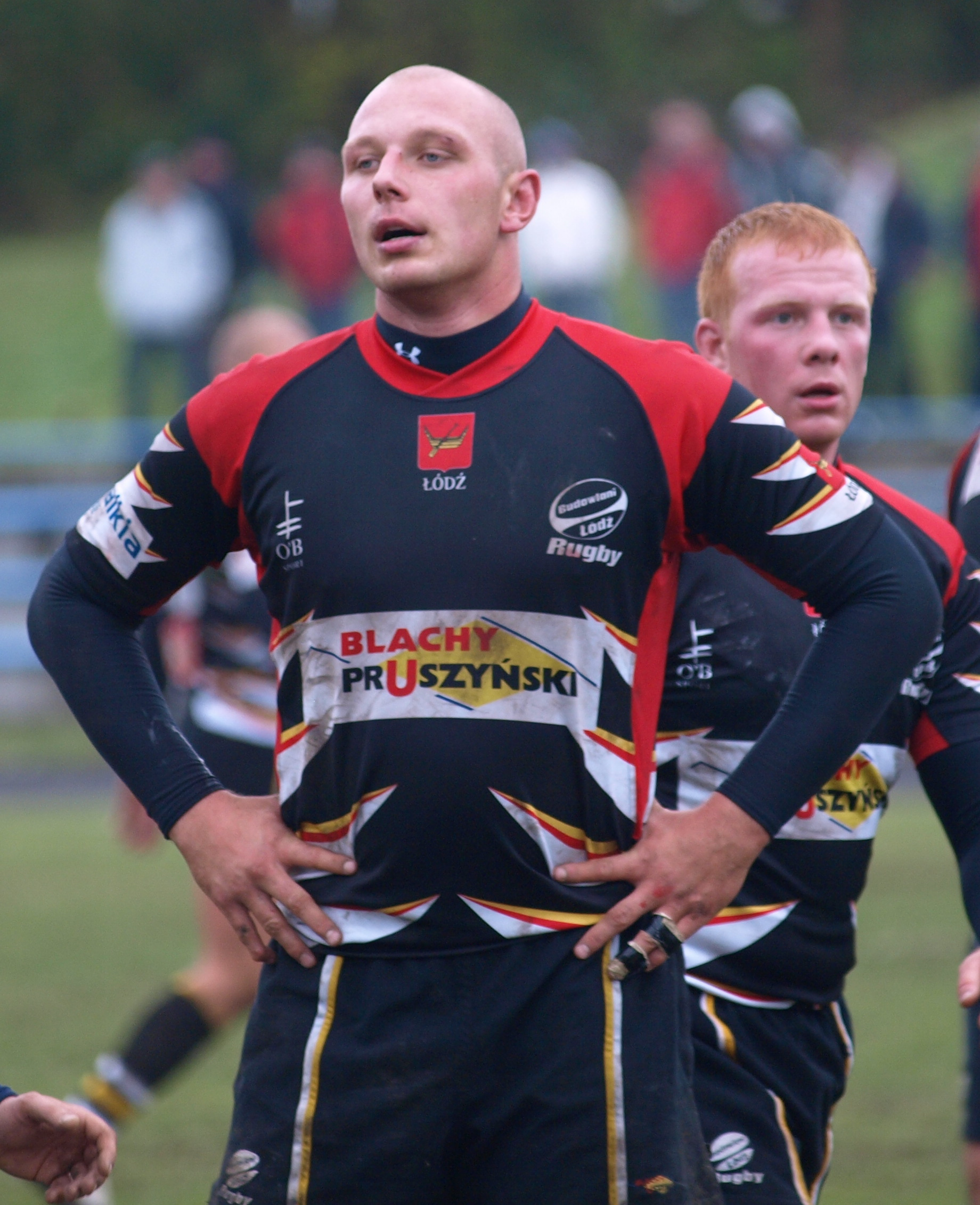
- Born: May 11, 1985 (age 41) Łódź
- Height: 1.96 m (6 ft 5 in)
- Weight: 108 kg (17 st 0 lb; 238 lb)

Rugby union career
- Position: Lock
International career
Years	Team	Apps	(Points)
2005-	Poland	24	(35)
National sevens team
Years	Team		Comps
- Poland

Kacper Ławski (born 11 May 1985 in Łódź), is a Polish rugby player, second or third line of the lock in the French club CS Vienne.

Kacper played at all age levels—cadet (U-16), juniors (U-18 World Cup participant in 2003, European champion 2003) and youth (U-20 European championship participant 2004). He is a Polish national player.

Ławski is also representative of the Polish rugby sevens.
