= Tarnawiec =

- Village
- Location within Poland
- Coordinates: 50°17′4″N 22°28′40″E
- Country: Poland
- Voivodeship: Subcarpathian
- County: Leżajsk
- Gmina: Kuryłówka
- Population: 270

Tarnawiec [tarˈnavʲɛt͡s] is a village in the administrative district of Gmina Kuryłówka, within Leżajsk County, Subcarpathian Voivodeship, in south-eastern Poland.

== See also ==
- Battle of Kuryłówka
