= Łukasz Opaliński (1581–1654) =

Polish–Lithuanian nobleman

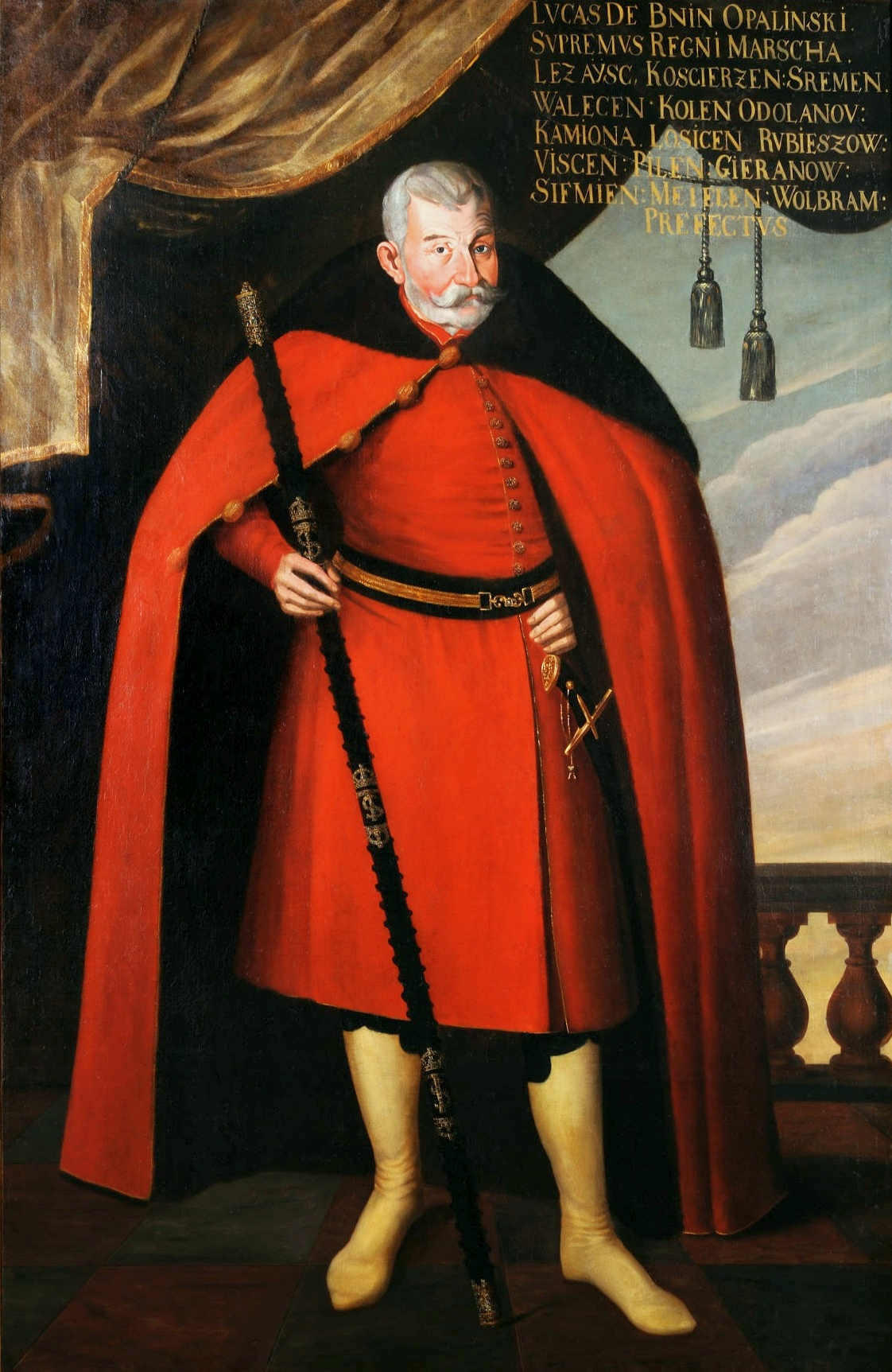
- Coat of arms: Clan Łodzia
- Born: 1581
- Died: 1654 (aged 72–73)
- Noble family: Opaliński
- Consorts: Anna Pilecka; Zofia Daniłowicz; Elżbieta Firlej
- Father: Andrzej Opaliński
- Mother: Katarzyna Kościelecka

Łukasz de Bnin Opaliński of Łodzia coat of arms (1581–1654) was a Polish nobleman.

He was castellan of Poznań from 1615, Crown Court Marshal from 1630, Crown Grand Marshal in 1634–1650, voivode of the Rawa, starosta Wałecki, Leżajski, Hrubieszowski, Kolski, Odolanowski, Śremski, Łosicki, Ratneński, Ujski and Pilski. He was an enemy of Stanisław Stadnicki.

In 1620 when Michał Piekarski tried to attack king Sigismund III Vasa, Opaliński threw himself between them, saving the king. He also probably snatched his ax and overpowered him.

He was a supporter and trusted retainer of King Władysław IV Vasa, considered efficient and just. At the same time he was merciless in exploiting the crown lands he was entrusted as a starost.

He had three wives, Anna Pilecka, Zofia Daniłowicz and Elżbieta Firlej. He had two children with Pilecka, Elżbieta Opalińska and Konstancja Opalińska, as well as one child with Daniłowicz, Katarzyna Opalińska.

Founder of basilica in Leżajsk.
