= Stanisław Tołpa =

Polish professor of botany

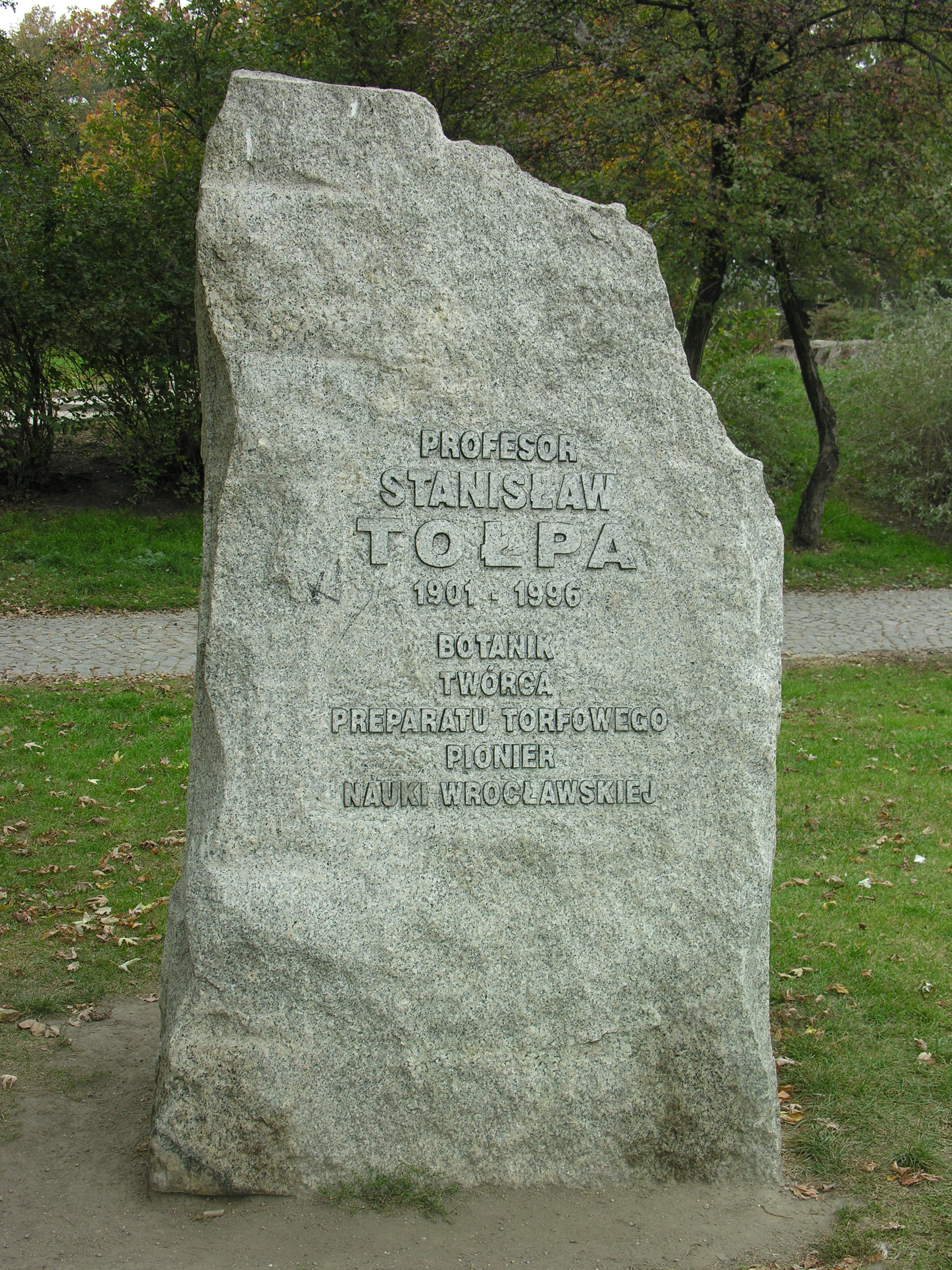
Stanisław Tołpa monument in Wrocław

Stanislaw Tołpa (3 November 1901, Ruda Łańcucka – 11 October 1996, Wrocław) was a Polish professor of botany. He has developed a method of peat preparation called by his name.

Tołpa, born into a poor peasant family in eastern Poland, graduated theologian, then studied mathematics and natural sciences at Lwów University where he completed a doctorate on peatlands in Chornohora. He worked as a biology teacher in a high school in Kalisz until 1939.

In 1945 he went to Wrocław. Initially, he was dean of the Faculty of Agriculture at Wroclaw University and Wroclaw University of Technology. Later he created a separate College of Agriculture and became its rector. He habilitated and received the title of professor.

His entire research career was devoted to peat. Under his leadership, marshes and peat bogs have been studied in the Biebrza Valley, Hawaii, and in the Lublin region. He has developed a classification of European peats. Over time, his interests shifted from the history and morphology of the peat to chemical and biological properties of its components. He detected compounds with specific biological activity. Johnson and Johnson eventually bought his life work. His only child inherited his wealth. She currently resides in Poland.

Based on his research in the 1960 a peat preparation made him famous, used in patients with multiple sclerosis. He was one of the founders of the Wroclaw branch of the Polish Academy of Sciences. His research also contributed to the protection of peat deposits in Poland.

After his retirement in 1971, he continued research within his laboratory of Biology and Biochemistry of Peat at Agricultural University in Wrocław. Patent for the manufacture of the preparation was ceded to the university. He died at the age of 95.
