= Moe Drabowsky =

American baseball player (1935–2006)

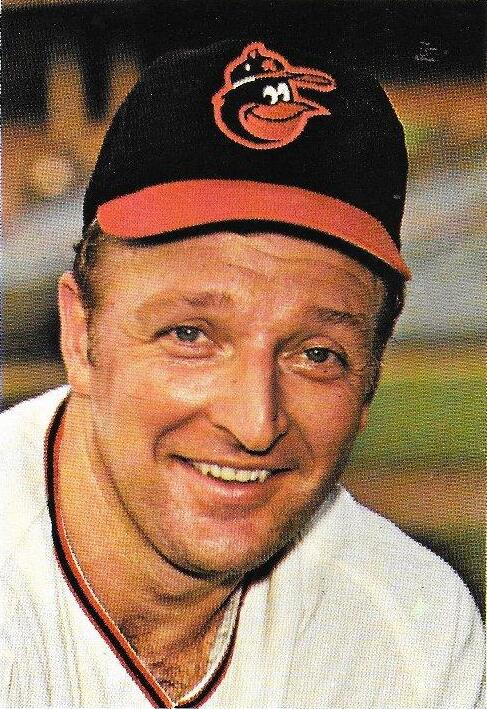
- Drabowsky with the Baltimore Orioles c. 1970
- Pitcher
- Born: July 21, 1935; Ozanna, Lwów, Poland
- Died: June 10, 2006 (aged 70); Little Rock, Arkansas, U.S.
- Batted: Right Threw: Right

MLB debut
- August 7, 1956, for the Chicago Cubs

Last MLB appearance
- September 19, 1972, for the Chicago White Sox

MLB statistics
- Win–loss record: 88–105
- Earned run average: 3.71
- Strikeouts: 1,162
- Stats at Baseball Reference

Teams
- Chicago Cubs (1956–1960); Milwaukee Braves (1961); Cincinnati Reds (1962); Kansas City Athletics (1962–1965); Baltimore Orioles (1966–1968); Kansas City Royals (1969–1970); Baltimore Orioles (1970); St. Louis Cardinals (1971–1972); Chicago White Sox (1972)

Career highlights and awards
- 2× World Series champion (1966, 1970)

Myron Walter Drabowsky (/drəˈbaʊski/ drə-BOW-skee; July 21, 1935 – June 10, 2006) was an American professional baseball pitcher who played in Major League Baseball (MLB) for the Chicago Cubs, Milwaukee Braves, Cincinnati Reds, Kansas City Athletics, Baltimore Orioles, Kansas City Royals, St. Louis Cardinals, and Chicago White Sox. A noted practical joker, Drabowsky engaged in such antics as leaving snakes in teammates' lockers or phoning the opposing team's bullpen to tell a pitcher to warm up. He batted and threw right-handed.

Born in Poland, Drabowsky emigrated to America in 1938. He excelled as a pitcher in high school and college and was signed as a bonus baby by the Chicago Cubs. He debuted for the Cubs in 1956 and finished tied for second in the National League in strikeouts in his rookie season. In 1958, he gave up Stan Musial's 3,000th hit. An arm injury that year curtailed his effectiveness, and after a couple more seasons with the team, he was traded to the Milwaukee Braves. He played for the Braves, the Cincinnati Reds, and the Kansas City Athletics in 1961 and 1962 before remaining with the Athletics through the end of the 1965 season. During this period, he was sent to the minor leagues a few times, and while in the major leagues, he typically went back and forth between the starting rotation and the bullpen, except in 1963, the year he had his lowest earned run average (ERA) as a starter. Drabowsky also was the losing pitcher to Early Wynn in Wynn's 300th win that season. Following the 1965 season, he was selected in the Rule 5 draft by the Baltimore Orioles.

Once in Baltimore, Drabowsky was used almost exclusively as a relief pitcher. After three starts in 1966, he pitched only in relief for the rest of his career. He became a part of one of the best bullpens in the major leagues and posted ERAs of 2.80, 1.60, and 1.91 during his first three years with the club. The Orioles won the American League (AL) pennant in 1966, and in Game 1 of the 1966 World Series, Drabowsky relieved an ineffective Dave McNally with the bases loaded and one out in the third inning. Though he walked a batter to let in a run, he finished the inning with the Orioles leading 4–2, and he threw six scoreless innings after it to preserve the Game 1 victory. The Orioles swept the Los Angeles Dodgers in four games.

Drabowsky was selected by the Kansas City Royals in the expansion draft after the 1968 season. He won their first game in franchise history and led the AL in wins for relief pitchers, with 11. In 1970, he was traded back to Baltimore, where he won his second World Series, this one against the Reds. He pitched for the St. Louis Cardinals in 1971 and 1972 before finishing out his career with the Chicago White Sox that year.

After his career, Drabowsky worked for an envelope company and a communications firm until the 1980s, when increased salaries for coaches allowed him to support himself in baseball. He was the pitching coach for the White Sox in 1986, then for several of their minor league teams. Later, he served as the pitching coach for the Cubs in 1994, before rejoining the Orioles as their minor league pitching instructor in Florida. He died June 10, 2006, at the age of 70.

== Early life ==
Moe was born Mirosław Drabowski in Ozanna, a village in southern Poland, located near Leżajsk. His mother was an American citizen. The two fled to the U.S. in 1938 when Adolf Hitler began mobilizing in Eastern Europe. His father joined them a year later, and the family settled in Wilson, Connecticut, a village in the town of Windsor, just north of Hartford.

Growing up in Connecticut, Drabowsky was an avid Boston Red Sox fan. His favorite player was Bobby Doerr, and he wanted to be a second baseman too, but he was converted to a pitcher by his prep school coach, who observed he had a good arm. Drabowsky went to the Loomis Prep School, now Loomis Chaffee School, in Windsor where he had an 8–0 record with a no-hitter his senior year.

He later attended Trinity College in Hartford, where he studied economics. He had an academic scholarship to study at the school until he started partying too much in a fraternity. While at Trinity, he studied economics and played for their varsity baseball team, with whom he also threw a no-hitter. He played summers in Canada, in the Halifax and District League, for the Truro Bearcats. While with Truro, he caught the eye of former Chicago Cubs shortstop Lenny Merullo in 1956, who signed him to play for the Cubs that year. Sources differ on the exact amount of the contract, but Drabowsky himself said it was for $75,000 ($888,000 today). This made Drabowsky a bonus baby, meaning the Cubs would have to keep him in the major leagues for two full seasons or expose him to waivers.

== Baseball career ==
=== Chicago Cubs (1956–60) ===
Drabowsky made his major league debut on August 7, 1956, having just turned 21. He pitched a scoreless inning of relief in a 6–1 loss to the Milwaukee Braves. Eleven days later, pitching coach Dutch Leonard asked Drabowsky, "How would you like to do some throwing tonight?” "I'd like it," Drabowsky responded. “Then you’re starting against the Cardinals tonight.” Pitching into the eighth inning, Drabowsky held the St. Louis Cardinals to one run, picking up his first major league victory. He continued to make starts for the Cubs the rest of the year and finished the season with a 2–4 record, a 2.47 earned run average (ERA), and 36 strikeouts in 51 innings pitched.

In 1957, Drabowsky was the Cubs' number two starter. He was 4–8 with a 5.04 ERA through July 4; after that, he went 9–7 the rest of the way, with a 2.51 ERA. Control problems affected him during the year, such as in a game against the Cincinnati Redlegs on June 2, when he hit four batters (including future teammate and Hall of Famer Frank Robinson twice) in 3 2/3 innings, tying a major league record. On August 4, in the first game of a doubleheader against the Pittsburgh Pirates, Drabowsky threw a shutout in a 6–0 victory. He threw another shutout against Cincinnati on September 4, also in the first game of a doubleheader, giving up just two hits this time in a 1–0 victory. Drabowsky finished the year with a 13–15 record. His 170 strikeouts tied him for second in the National League with teammate Dick Drott, behind another rookie, Jack Sanford of the Philadelphia Phillies, who had 188. His 33 games started were 4th (tied with Lew Burdette and Sanford), 239 2/3 innings pitched 6th, and 12 complete games 8th in the NL (tied with Brooks Lawrence and Don Newcombe). Additionally, he led the league with ten hit by pitches.

In 1958, Drabowsky did not appear in a game with the Cubs until May 1, delayed by a throat ailment and a stint in the United States Army Reserve. In his second start of the year, on May 13, he threw a curveball in the sixth inning of a start against the Cardinals which pinch-hitter Stan Musial made contact with for a double. The hit was Musial's 3,000th. Entering July 11, Drabowsky had an 8–7 record and a 3.80 ERA. In a game against the Pittsburgh Pirates held that day, though, Drabowsky "heard something snap in [his] elbow." He gave up five runs in the next inning, skipped his next start, and failed to get out of the first inning in his next before having to take time off. "The arm responded to treatment at first,” said Drabowsky, “then I had trouble again. I strained my shoulder favoring the elbow. One thing led to another." He returned for four starts in August but struggled and was shut down for the rest of the year. At season's end, Drabowsky had posted a 9–11 record with a 4.51 ERA and 77 strikeouts. He gave up 19 home runs, three shy of the previous year's total, despite pitching 114 fewer innings.

Drabowsky kept his spot in the Cubs' rotation in 1959 but saw little improvement from the year before. His best game of the year came on August 7, when he threw a five-hit shutout against the Pittsburgh Pirates. Drabowsky finished the season 5–10 in 31 games (23 starts), but his ERA dropped to 4.13, and his innings pitched rose to 141 2/3. However, he had seven fewer strikeouts than he had in 1958.

In 1960 spring training, Drabowsky's arm was pain-free. However, used mostly in relief, he posted a 9.70 ERA through July 4. This got him a demotion to the minor leagues for the first time, as he was sent to the Triple-A Houston Buffs of the American Association. At Houston, Drabowsky won all five of his starts and had a 0.90 ERA before getting recalled to the Cubs in August. He pitched better for the Cubs in his return, posting a 4.03 ERA in his final 11 games. In 32 games (seven starts), Drabowsky had a 3–1 record, a 6.44 ERA, and 26 strikeouts in 50 1/3 innings pitched.

=== Milwaukee Braves, Cincinnati Reds, and Kansas City Athletics (1961–65) ===
At the end of spring training in 1961, the Cubs decided no longer required Drabowsky and traded him along with Seth Morehead to the Milwaukee Braves for Daryl Robertson and Andre Rodgers. Milwaukee did not have room for him in their rotation, though, and used him exclusively in relief, where he had an 0–2 record and a 4.62 ERA in 16 games. After Drabowsky gave up four runs in the sixth inning of a 10–8 loss to the Cincinnati Reds on June 8, Milwaukee banished him to the minor leagues and never bothered to call him up again the rest of the season. He finished the year pitching for the Louisville Colonels of the American Association, where in 20 games (nine starts), he had a 9–6 record but a 4.75 ERA, with 54 strikeouts in 106 innings pitched. Milwaukee left him unprotected from the Rule 5 draft after the season, and he was selected by Cincinnati. He started 1962 with the Reds, who used him both as a starter and a reliever. In 23 games for them (10 starts) through August 4, he went 2–6 for them with a 4.99 ERA. On August 13, the Kansas City Athletics acquired him for cash. He appeared in 10 games (three starts) for Kansas City the rest of the year, going 1–1 with a 5.14 ERA. Drabowsky's combined stats on the season were a 3–7 record, a 5.03 ERA, and 75 strikeouts in 33 games (13 starts).

Kansas City sent Drabowsky to the Triple-A Portland Beavers of the Pacific Coast League to start the 1963 season; most of his appearances were in relief (19 games, 2 starts) but after going 5–1 with a 2.13 ERA, he got called up to the major league club in June. Back in the majors, he was used as a starter once again. He lost his first six decisions, then went 7–7 the rest of the year to finish 1963 with a 7–13 record. One of the losses from the losing streak was notable; it was the 300th win for Early Wynn, on July 13. Despite the losing numbers, he had a very good 3.05 ERA and topped one hundred strikeouts for the first time since his rookie year, making the 1963 season a resurgence.

Drabowsky's 1964 season got off to a good start, as he pitched into the eighth inning in his first start and gave up just one run in a 3–1 victory over the Washington Senators. After that, he would lose seven decisions in a row before getting another win on June 8 (again against the Senators). He pitched out of the bullpen for a few games in June; by the end of July, he was being used almost exclusively as a reliever. Drabowsky appeared in the most games of his career that season (53), starting 21 times and logging 168 1/3 innings. He struck out 119, the most since his rookie season. However, his record was 5–13, and his ERA was 5.29, a jump from the 3.05 mark the year before.

Despite the losing record and the high ERA the year before, Drabowsky was Kansas City's Opening Day starter in 1965. He went 0–3 with a 5.55 ERA in his first five starts before getting sent to the bullpen, then demoted to the Athletics' Triple-A affiliate, now the Vancouver Mounties, halfway through June. Drabowsky was not called back up, finishing the season in Vancouver. In 14 games (five starts) with Kansas City, he had a 1–5 record and a 4.42 ERA. In 17 games (12 starts) with Vancouver, he had an 8–2 record with a 2.44 ERA and 85 strikeouts in 96 innings—his time in Vancouver would be the last time he ever pitching in the minor leagues. After the 1965 season, Baseball-Reference reports that the St. Louis Cardinals purchased his contract from Kansas City on an unknown date. The Society for American Baseball Research reports merely that the Cardinals were interested in selecting him in the Rule 5 Draft from Kansas City but ultimately never got a chance to select him. Either way, he would not pitch for the Cardinals in 1966, as the Baltimore Orioles took him in the Rule 5 Draft on November 29, 1965.

=== Baltimore Orioles (1966–68) ===
The trade to Baltimore was a turning point in Drabowsky's career. It was here that he became a full-time relief pitcher; after making three starts for the Orioles in August 1966, Drabowsky would never start a game again over his final six years in the major leagues. With teammates Stu Miller, Dick Hall, and Eddie Fisher, Drabowsky was a part of one of the best bullpens of the 1960s.

Though Drabowsky was part of the Orioles' roster to begin the 1966 season, he was only used nine times in the team's first 37 games, and he had a 3.94 ERA. At the end of May, he asked pitching coach Harry Breechen if he could throw once every two nights. Pitching more frequently from that time forth, Drabowsky's ERA fell to 2.59 over his final 35 games. Bullpen coach Sherm Lollar speculated joining the Orioles gave Drabowsky new confidence. "We were a contender and could support his pitching." Drabowsky finished the year with six wins, no losses, a 2.81 ERA, and seven saves. He struck out 96 in 98 innings pitched as the Orioles won the American League (AL) pennant, sending Drabowsky to the playoffs for the first time in his career.

In the opening game of the 1966 World Series against the Los Angeles Dodgers, Drabowsky entered the game in the third inning with one out and the bases loaded after starter Dave McNally was taken out of the game. After striking out the first batter, Jim Barbieri, he walked Jim Gilliam to force in Lou Johnson for a run to cut Baltimore's lead to 4–2. That would be the last run the Dodgers scored in the entire series, however, as the Orioles would sweep them 4–0, the Orioles' next three wins coming on shutouts from Jim Palmer, Wally Bunker, and McNally. Drabowsky set a one-game World Series record for relievers by striking out 11 batters, and he tied Hod Eller's 47-year record of six consecutive fans in the 1919 World Series.

Over the next two seasons, Drabowsky continued to perform excellently in relief. In 1967, he was one of the few Oriole pitchers to repeat his success from the season before. Struggles by Stu Miller, who had gotten most of the Oriole saves a year before, allowed Drabowsky to be the team's primary closer. Drabowsky got off to a 6–0 start, with a mere six earned runs allowed through his first 25 games of the year. Beginning with his first loss July 28, Drabowsky would finish out the year with a 1–5 record, and his ERA would rise to 3.45 in his final 18 games. Still, Drabowsky finished the year 7–6, with a 1.60 ERA. He struck out 96 in 95 2/3 innings pitched and was tied for seventh in the AL with 12 saves, the only season in his career that he finished in the Top 10 of a league in saves.

Drabowsky did not allow a run in 1968 until his tenth game of the year. For the second year in a row, he posted an ERA under 2.00 (1.91). He threw 61 1/3 innings in 45 games, and he had a 4–4 record with seven saves and 46 strikeouts. MLB added four clubs for the 1969 season, however, and Drabowsky was one of the few veterans selected by the Kansas City Royals in the expansion draft, ending his first stint with the Orioles.

=== Later career ===
Back in Kansas City, Drabowsky negotiated with his new club for a raise before signing his contract on February 28, 1969. He won the first-ever game in Royals' history, pitching a scoreless 12th on April 8 against the Minnesota Twins in a 4–3 victory. The win was the first of many for Drabowsky that season; he led all AL relief pitchers in 1969 with 11 victories. Additionally, he saved 11 games and finished 37 games (7th in the league). He threw 98 innings in 52 appearances and had a 2.94 ERA.

Drabowsky started 1970 with the Royals again. He spent time in the hospital after an adverse reaction to medication, presumably during a stretch in May where he had 12 days off. On June 15, he saw on the out-of-town scoreboard that the Orioles' pitchers had struggled late in a game against the Milwaukee Brewers and speculated that the team would be wanting some bullpen help. He was reacquired by the Orioles for Bobby Floyd that same day before the trade deadline. "I always knew I'd come back to the Orioles someday," he said. He made 21 appearances for the Orioles the rest of the season, finishing the year with a 5–4 record, a 3.52 ERA, and 59 strikeouts in 69 innings pitched in 45 games between Kansas City and Baltimore. The Orioles won the AL East, and Drabowsky was a part of their playoff roster. He did not make an appearance in the first-round sweep of the Twins but was used twice in the World Series against the Reds. In Game 2, he entered in the fifth and pitched 2 1/3 innings, giving up a solo home run to Johnny Bench in the Orioles' 6–5 victory over the Reds. He threw a scoreless ninth inning in Game 4, but the Orioles lost that game 6–5. However, that was the Orioles only loss of the series, and Drabowsky won another World Series ring as the Orioles defeated the Reds in five games.

Drabowsky was traded to the St. Louis Cardinals for Jerry DaVanon on November 30, 1970. He got into 51 games his first season with St. Louis, going 6–1 with a 3.43 ERA, eight saves, and 49 strikeouts in 60 1/3 innings pitched. His ERA improved with the Cardinals during the next season; it was at 2.60 through his first 30 games when the club released him August 9. Signed days later by the Chicago White Sox, he became the 6th-oldest player in the American League. Drabowsky saw the end of his career coming in a game against the Boston Red Sox in August. "I threw a fastball [to Tommy Harper], and I watched that ball go to the plate, and I said, ‘When in the world is that ball going to get to the plate?’ I said, ‘Hey, my career is over.’” In 37 games, he had a 1–1 record, a 2.57 ERA, two saves, and 26 strikeouts in 35 innings. He lasted until the end of the year with Chicago, but following his release on October 6, Drabowsky would never pitch again.

== Career statistics and pitching style ==
In 17 seasons Drabowsky won 88 games, lost 105, saved 55, struck out 1,162 and walked 702 in 1,641 innings pitched, posting a 3.71 ERA. He threw a fastball, curveball, and slider. When the Cubs first signed him, he was a hard-thrower, which helped him tie for second in the league in strikeouts as a rookie. Despite control issues, Drabowsky was supposed to be a future star for the team. However, his velocity went down after his arm injury in 1958. “I struggled for a few years after developing arm trouble,” summed up Drabowsky. “Then I made some delivery adjustments and became a pitcher instead of a thrower. I also became a student of the game, analyzing hitter’s strengths and weaknesses, and this is how I survived.”

== Later life and coaching ==
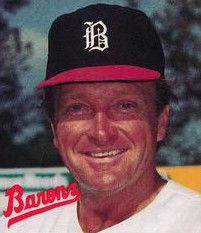
Drabowsky as a coach with the Birmingham Barons c. 1988.

Following his career, Drabowsky initially worked in other fields. He had a job with the Garden City Envelope Company in Chicago through 1982, following which he worked with a Canadian-owned communications firm. Changing salaries for coaches enabled him to return to baseball in the mid-1980s, and he became the Chicago White Sox' pitching coach in 1986. He then coached White Sox farm teams for several years: the Double-A Birmingham Barons from 1987 to 1988 and the Triple-A Vancouver Canadians from 1989 to 1991. Moving to the Cubs' organization in 1993, he served as the team's minor league pitching instructor for a year, then was the Cubs' pitching coach in 1994. After that, he served as the Orioles' minor league pitching instructor in Florida for over ten years, until his death in 2006.

== Practical joker ==
Drabowsky was well known as a prankster whose jokes involved, among other things, being rolled to first base in a wheelchair after claiming to be hit on the foot by a pitch while with the Cubs. (Teammate Dick Drott obtained the wheelchair and pushed Drabowsky to first—and was ejected from the game.) Frequently, he would make prank phone calls with the bullpen phones. While on the road at Anaheim Stadium in California, he once ordered a takeout meal from a Chinese restaurant—in Hong Kong. The year after he left Kansas City, when Baltimore was playing the Athletics on May 27, he called Kansas City's bullpen and, imitating former manager Alvin Dark's voice, ordered Lew Krausse Jr. to warm up, then sit down again. Not until the third call did someone recognize his voice. "You should've seen them scramble, trying to get Lew Krausse warmed up in a hurry," Drabowsky said. "It was really funny." Once, he inserted three goldfish into the other team's water cooler.

Snake pranks were a specialty of Drabowsky's; while he was with the Orioles, he cultivated relationships with a number of pet shops around Baltimore. The stores would loan him their snakes, and Drabowsky managed to scare such famous players as Brooks Robinson, Paul Blair, and Yogi Berra. During the 1969 World Series, a biplane flew over Memorial Stadium during Game 1 with a banner proclaiming, "Good Luck Birds: Beware of Moe." For Game 2, he got the Baltimore Zoo to deliver a seven-foot black snake to the stadium. Though he was with the Orioles for their next World Series against the Reds, Drabowsky was more subdued in 1970: "When you're in the Series, you have to be careful because [pranks] might backfire." However, this caution did not apparently apply to people off the field, as Drabowsky gave Commissioner Bowie Kuhn a hot foot during the Orioles' 1970 World Series celebration. "You never saw a shoe come off so fast in your life," Drabowsky assessed the effectiveness of that prank.

In 1971, sportswriter Hal Bock was twice the victim of a Drabowsky hot foot during a series in New York (NL President Chub Feeney responded with an official censure.) During the same year, Drabowsky also threw cherry bombs in Chief Noc-A-Homa's teepee on a road trip to Atlanta. After retiring, he continued his jokes during his coaching days. Once, he even got arrested for cruelty to animals; Drabowsky wondered if he had done something unacceptable until he was informed at the police station that it was a joke arranged by his players. In the Jim Bouton book "Ball Four", one of Drabowsky's teammates claimed that Drabowsky got sick on a team flight and "puked up a panty girdle." "There is no bigger flake in organized baseball than Drabowsky," Bouton said.

== Polish heritage ==
Chicago columnist Mike Royko stated in his annual Cubs quiz, April 11, 1968, that Drabowsky "is still considered the best pitcher that Ozanna, Poland, ever produced." In 1987, Drabowsky took a trip there with Hall of Famer Stan Musial to hold a baseball clinic in Kutno. Though Poland was his birthplace, he needed an interpreter to communicate with the players. "Talent in the raw, this is," Drabowsky characterized the Polish ballplayers with his usual wry sense of humor. "Very raw. Very, very raw. Extremely raw." He and Musial brought the participants baseball equipment donated by the MLB Commissioner's office, training the players on the fundamentals of the game. Drabowsky was inducted into the National Polish-American Sports Hall of Fame in 1999.

== Personal life ==
In 1957 Drabowsky met his first wife, Elisabeth Johns, a flight attendant for United Airlines, while traveling with his teammates. They were married in 1958 and had two daughters: Myra Beth and Laura Anne. A baseball fan, Elisabeth once told a reporter that she had harbored a crush on Dodgers' star Gil Hodges since she was ten. Drabowsky's daughter Laura, played the role of Brenda Madison on Port Charles. After 35 years of marriage, Moe and Elisabeth divorced, and Drabowsky got remarried in 1992. During his playing career, he worked as a stockbroker in the offseason. The Sporting News quipped that he came to the major leagues with The Sporting News in one hand and The Wall Street Journal in the other.

Drabowsky died in Little Rock, Arkansas following a long battle with multiple myeloma at age 70 on June 10, 2006. First diagnosed with the disease in 2000 and given six months to live, he survived longer than expected, continuing to coach while undergoing stem cell treatments.

== See also ==
- List of baseball players who went directly to Major League Baseball
