= Gaspar Tochman =

American lawyer

Kasper Tochman
- Born: 1797; Łętownia, Kingdom of Galicia and Lodomeria
- Died: 1880 (aged 82–83); Spotsylvania County, Virginia, U.S.A
- Spouse: Appolonia Jagiello
- Military career
- Allegiance: Kingdom of Poland; Confederate States
- Branch: November Insurgents; Confederate States Army
- Service years: 1830–1831, 1861–1865
- Rank: Major (insurgents); Colonel (C.S.)
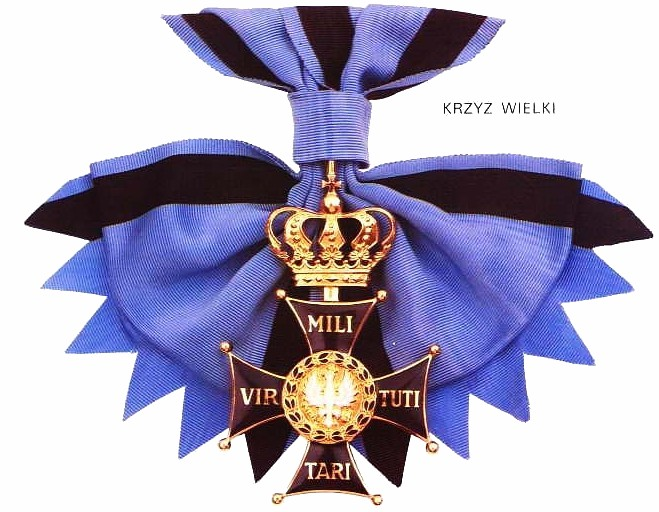
- Awards: Virtuti Militari
- Other work: Lawyer

Kasper (Gaspar) Tochman (1797 – December 20, 1880) was a Polish-born American lawyer and soldier who formed the Polish Brigade (14th and 15th Louisiana regiments) of Johnson's Division.

== Early life ==
Tochman was born in Łętownia in 1797. He studied Law and Administration at Warsaw University and after graduation worked as an attorney in Warsaw. Vicechairman of the Polish Patriotic Society, he was a good friend of the Commander-in-Chief of the November Uprising Jan Zygmunt Skrzynecki as well as Joachim Lelewel and Maurycy Mochnacki. A renowned speaker and writer he acted in the Society for Upbringing Orphans after the Fallen Polish Knights (Polish: Towarzystwo Wychowania Dzieci po Poległych Rycerzach Polskich).

== November Uprising and emigration ==
Tochman served as an officer (lieutenant or even major according to various sources) during the November Uprising. After the Battle of Białołęka he was awarded Virtuti Militari as a testimony to his bravery.

With the defeat of the Insurgents Tochman was forced to flee with Gen. Maciej Rybiński's Corps. He emigrated to Avignon, France where he served as secretary of the Polish Council and later traveled through France in hopes of gathering more supporters. During that time he joined the Eagle and Pahonia freemason lodge. In 1837 Tochman became persona non grata for the French government and decided to emigrate to United States. He worked as French teacher in New York City until 1840 when he was granted citizenship and began studying American civil law - this enabled him to acquire attorney licence and start a practice of law in Washington D.C. in 1845.

He was an active member of the Polish diaspora - from 1840 to 1844 he gave over a hundred lectures on the situation of then partitioned Poland. An account published by the Baltimore Sun described him as a patriot of high reputation who was capable of "thrilling bursts of eloquence". His speeches were published in 1844 in Lecture on the social, political and literary condition of Poland, and her future prospects. Tochman tried both to integrate the Polish community - by establishing the Polish-Slavonic Literary Society which gathered also many Americans - as well as sought contact with prominent US officials; his house in Virginia was visited by Abraham Lincoln, William Seward or Samuel Tilden among others. As an active sympathiser of the Democratic Party he was elected Virginia State Elector.

In 1851, he married Appolonia Jagiello, a widely celebrated military nurse who had previously accompanied László Újházi in his efforts to establish a Hungarian colony in the United States for exiles of the unsuccessful Hungarian Revolution of 1848.

Tochman represented the Kościuszko family during the inheritance court battle between them and the Russian Empire represented by the Russian diplomatic representative Aleksandr Bodisko.

== Civil War ==
After the outbreak of the American Civil War Tochman, a pro-slavery farm owner organised the 14th and 15th Louisiana Regiments as part of the famous Louisiana Tigers brigade. The Polish Brigade fought at Gettysburg as part of 2nd Corps, Johnson's Division. On July 2, it sustained heavy casualties. Despite the fact that Tochman called himself General he was "only" a Colonel. Tochman's joining the Confederate Army was criticised by Lelewel and the Polish emigrants close to him.

== Postbellum ==
After the defeat of the Confederacy, Tochman was nominated Virginia Immigration Commissary gathering people to settle in the state. Tochman died at his farm near Washington on December 20, 1880.
