= Naklik =

- Village
- Location within Poland
- Coordinates: 50°22′N 22°28′E
- Country: Poland
- Voivodeship: Lublin
- County: Biłgoraj
- Gmina: Potok Górny

Population
  - Total: 458
- Time zone: UTC+1 (CET)
  - Summer (DST): UTC+2 (CEST)

Naklik [ˈnaklik] is a village in the administrative district of Gmina Potok Górny, within Biłgoraj County, Lublin Voivodeship, in eastern Poland.

== History ==
15 Polish citizens were murdered by Nazi Germany in the village during World War II.
