= Witold Szczypiński =

Witold Szczypiński (born 7 February 1955 in Sarzyna) – vice-president of the Management Board of Grupa Azoty S.A., Director General (former Zakłady Azotowe in Tarnowie-Mościcach S.A.). Completed the Silesian University of Technology at the Faculty of Production Management in the scope of industry organisation and management, specialty chemical industry.

== Business career ==
He has worked for Zakłady Azotowe in Tarnów-Mościce S.A. since 1979. In 1979–1987 he worked at the positions of: production master, independent process engineer, specialist process engineer in the Synthesis Unit in contemporary Zakłady Azotowe named after F. Dzierżyński in Tarnów (currently, Grupa Azoty S.A.). From 1987 to 1990 he was the manager of the Department of Silicon and Synthesis Unit, in 1991–1999 he worked as the manager of the Synthesis Unit.

In 1997–1999 he represented Zakłady Azotowe in Tarnów-Mościce in the Supervisory Board of the Przedsiębiorstwo Innowacyjno-Wdrożeniowe UNISIL Sp. z o.o. In 1999–2001 he performed the function of the director of Plastic Centre and from 2002 to 2007 was the director for technology and development in Zakłady Azotowe in Tarnów-Mościce S.A. In 2007–2008 he was a Member of the Management Board of Zakłady in Tarnów. In 2007–2008 he attended the Supervisory Board of Tarnowskie Wodociągi Sp. z o.o. In 2008 he was assigned the representative of the contemporary Zakłady Azotowe in Tarnów-Mościce S.A. in the supervisory board of the Design Office of Zakłady Azotowe "BIPROZAT" Sp. z o.o and then - PKCh Sp. z o.o. (2008–2016), ATT Polymers GmbH (2011–2013) and Grupa Azoty ZAK SA (2012–2016).

In 2008 he acted as the president of the management board of Zakłady Azotowe in Tarnów-Mościce S.A. In June 2008 he was assigned the vice-president of the management board of Grupa Azoty S.A. Since March 2014 he has also performed the function of the General Director of the company Grupa Azoty S.A. seated in Tarnów. As a member of the management board, he is responsible for, e.g. the integration of the plastic production and organic syntheses and sponsoring activity.

In 2011–2015 he was the member of the Scientific Board of the Institute of Heavy Organic Synthesis "Blachownia" in Kędzierzyn-Koźle. In 2013 he was assigned to the Supervisory Board of Grupa Azoty SIARKOPOL.

He is the head of the Supervisory Board of the Polskie Konsocjum Chemiczne Sp. z o.o.

== Academic career ==
From 2011 to 2015 he performed the function of the member of the Committee of the Chemical and Process Engineering in the Polish Academy of Sciences. In 2012–2015 he was the member of the Committee managing the strategical program of scientific research and developmental works "Advanced Technologies of Energy Generation" of the National Centre for Research and Development. From 2007 to 2010 he was the head of the Management Board of the SITPChem Department in Tarnów.

He is the author or co-author numerous specialist projects: including six under patent protection, concerning the production of ammonia, hydrogen, food carbon dioxide, polyoxymethylene, polycrystalline silicon, catylisers and power engineering infrastructure.

== Private life ==
His father - Zbigniew Szczypiński participated in the development of plants in Tarnów in the 1960s and 1970s. of the 20th century. He performed the function of, e.g. the technical director of the factory in Tarnów-Mościce. He is married and has a daughter.
