= Kacper Ryx =

2006 novel by Mariusz Wollny

- Author: Mariusz Wollny
- Cover artist: Dariusz Suchocki
- Language: Polish
- Series: Kacper Ryx
- Subject: Medieval Kraków
- Genre: Historical novel, detective fiction
- Publisher: Wydawnictwo Otwarte
- Publication date: 2006
- Publication place: Poland
- Media type: Print (Paperback)
- Pages: 448 pp
- ISBN: 83-7079-385-1
- Followed by: Kacper Ryx i król przeklęty

Kacper Ryx is a Polish historical crime novel written by Mariusz Wollny, published for the first time in 2006 by Kraków-based Wydawnictwo Otwarte.

Novel features many historical characters, including poets Mikołaj Sęp-Szarzyński, Jan Kochanowski and Mikołaj Rej. It also features Jan Zamojski, Jan Tomasz Drohojowski, Zygmunt II August, Mikołaj Rej, Łukasz Górnicki and Erazm Czeczotka. Additionally, the important role is played by the legendary character of Pan Twardowski.

It met generally positive critical acclaim, resulting in two sequels, Kacper Ryx i król przeklęty (2008) and Kacper Ryx i Tyran Nienawistny (2010). The book was read on the Radio Kraków

It was reissued in 2007 by the same publishing house, having 580 pages, with 2 maps attached and 6 pages long glossary. In 2011, it was released as audiobook

== Plot synopsis ==
The novel begins with a scene of mystification. With the help of Twardowski, brothers Mniszech convince king Zygmunt August that his dead wife, Barbara Radziwiłłówna, was resurrected. The action moves to Kraków. In an inn owned by Kacper's aunt, he mets Kochanowski and Górnicki. With the recommendation of the first one, he is appointed as an investigator who must solve the case of stolen seal.

A short investigation results in determining the thief, Bartosz from Lusina. His capture requests a voyage outside Kraków. Kacper and Mikolaj Sep Szarzynski manage to capture the offender, but they are lost at surrounding marsh.
