= Leżajsk County =

Leżajsk County Powiat leżajski
- County
- Flag Coat of arms

- Location within the voivodeship
- Coordinates (Leżajsk): 50°16′N 22°26′E
- Country: Poland
- Voivodeship: Subcarpathian
- Seat: Leżajsk
- Gminas: Total 5 (incl. 1 urban): Leżajsk; Gmina Grodzisko Dolne; Gmina Kuryłówka; Gmina Leżajsk; Gmina Nowa Sarzyna

Area
  - Total: 583.01 km^{2} (225.10 sq mi)

Population (2019)
  - Total: 69,479
  - Density: 119.17/km^{2} (308.66/sq mi)
  - Urban: 19,687
  - Rural: 49,792
- Car plates: RLE
- Website: www.starostwo.lezajsk.pl

Leżajsk County (Polish: powiat leżajski) is a unit of territorial administration and local government (powiat) in Subcarpathian Voivodeship, south-eastern Poland. It came into being on January 1, 1999, as a result of the Polish local government reforms passed in 1998. Its administrative seat and largest town is Leżajsk, which lies 41 kilometres (25 mi) north-east of the regional capital Rzeszów. The only other town in the county is Nowa Sarzyna, lying 11 km (7 mi) north-west of Leżajsk.

The county covers an area of 583.01 square kilometres (225.1 sq mi). As of 2019 its total population is 69,479, of which the population of Leżajsk is 13,853, that of Nowa Sarzyna is 5,834, and the rural population is 49,792.

== Neighbouring counties ==
Leżajsk County is bordered by Biłgoraj County to the north-east, Przeworsk County and Łańcut County to the south, Rzeszów County to the south-west, and Nisko County to the north-west.

== Administrative divisions ==
The county is subdivided into five gminas (one urban, one urban-rural and three rural). These are listed in the following table, in descending order of population.

Gmina	Type	Area (km^{2})	Population (2019)	Seat
Gmina Nowa Sarzyna	urban-rural	144.6	21,585	Nowa Sarzyna
Gmina Leżajsk	rural	198.5	20,300	Leżajsk *
Leżajsk	urban	20.3	13,853	
Gmina Grodzisko Dolne	rural	78.4	8,008	Grodzisko Dolne
Gmina Kuryłówka	rural	141.3	5,733	Kuryłówka
* seat not part of the gmina

== Notable residents ==
- Moe Drabowsky, American major league baseball pitcher
- Stanisław Tołpa (1901–1996), Polish professor, botanist, and theologian.
- Witold Szczypiński (1955–), vice-president of the Management Board of Grupa Azoty S.A.
- Damian Muskus (1967–), Polish bishop.
- Gaspar Tochman (1797–1880), Polish-American lawyer and soldier.
- Rabbi Elimelech Weisblum (1717–1787), one of the Hasidic movement's founding Rebbes.
- Count Jan Potocki (1761–1815), captain, engineer of the Crown Army, ethnologist, Egyptologist, linguist, and author.
- Tadeusz Hollender (1910–1943), Polish poet, translator, humorist and member of the Polish resistance movement in World War II, murdered by the Gestapo
- Boguslaw Szwacz (1912–2009), artist and teacher
- Tadeusz Lubicz-Niezabitowski (1896–1952), colonel who served in the Polish Armed Forces and took part in the Battle of Grudziądz
- Józef Zych (1938–), lawyer, politician, and former Marshal of the Sejm.
