= Bernardine Monastery Complex, Leżajsk =

Monastery in Leżajsk

Bernardine Monastery Complex in Leżajsk
- Zespół Klasztorny Bernardynów w Leżajsku
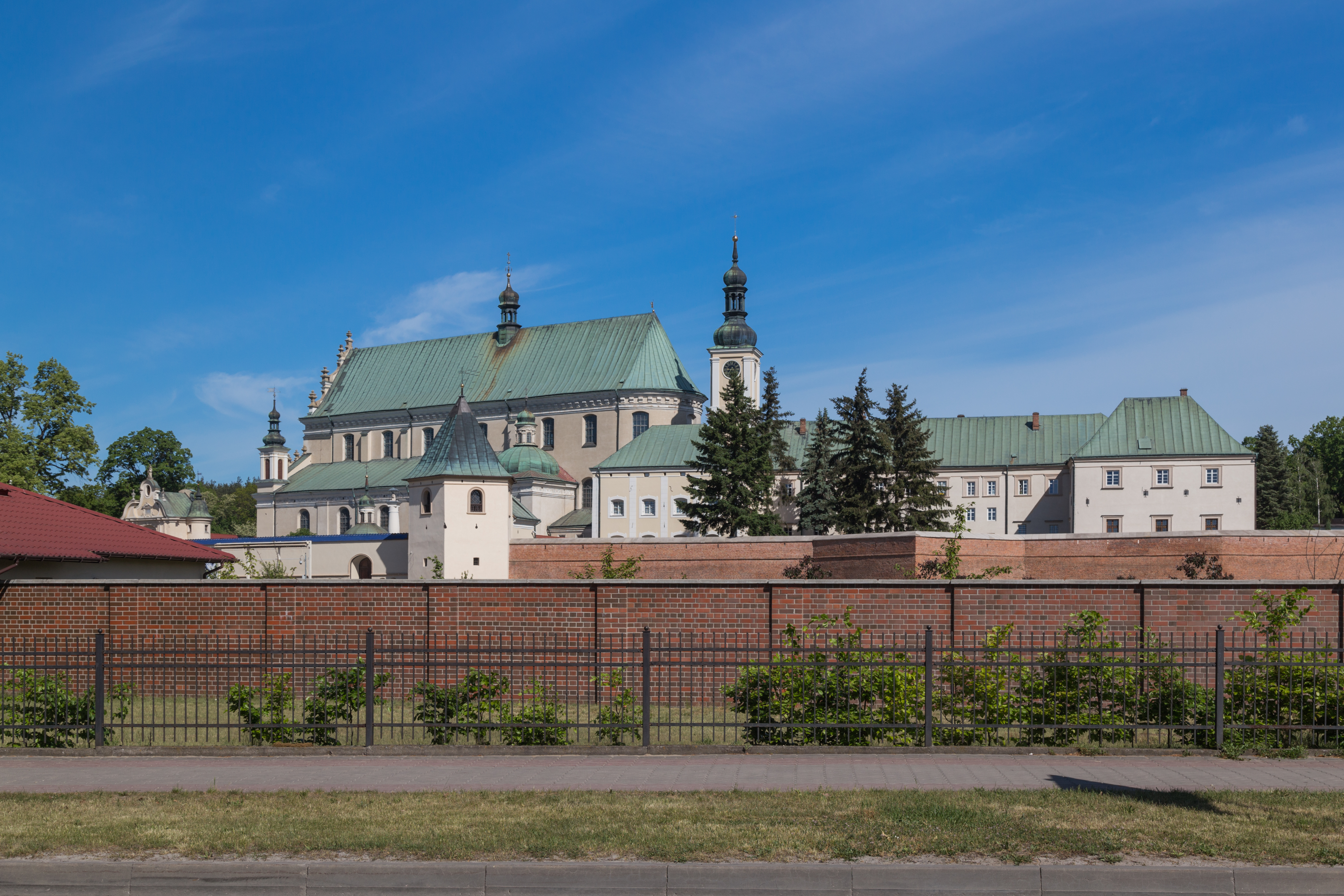

- Location within Poland

Monastery information
- Established: 1608

Site
- Location: Leżajsk
- Country: Poland
- Coordinates: 50°16′14.5″N 22°24′33.6″E

The Bernardine Monastery Complex in Leżajsk is a 17th century monastery in Leżajsk, Poland. The complex features a basilica and monastic residence. It is listed as a Historic Monument of Poland.

== History ==
According to legend, the complex lies on the site where a villager had a vision of Mary. The villager, Tomasz Michałek, was collecting wood in the forest when Mary appeared in a bright light and instructed him to erect a church on the site. He returned to the village to communicate the vision to the local authorities.

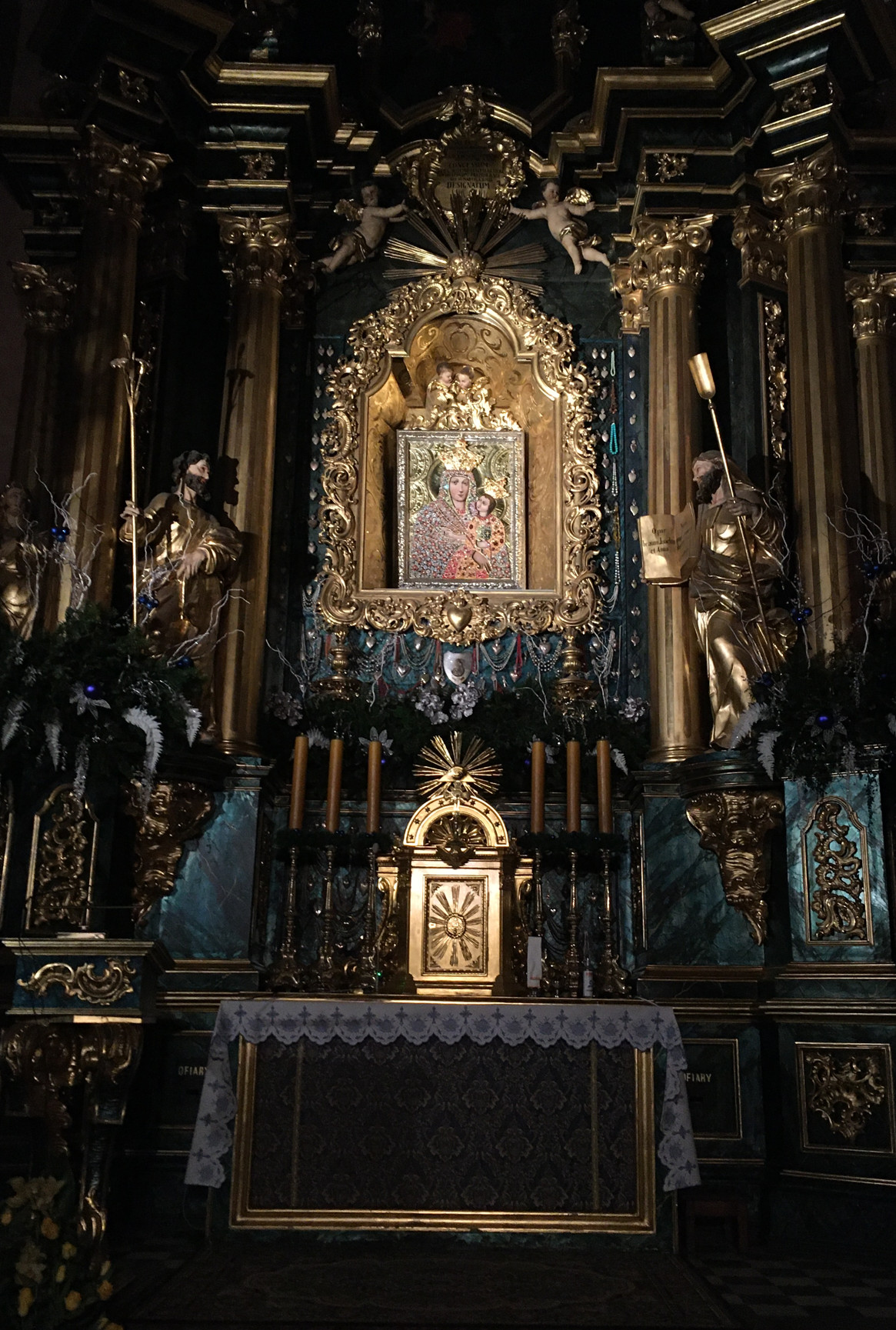
An interior altar

The first sacral structure on the site was a wooden church constructed in 1592 for St. Ann, but this church could not contain the capacity of visitors that came to the site. Łukasz Opaliński and Bishop Maciej Pstrokoński brought monks to the site in 1608 to establish the monastery. King Sigismund III also provided assistance with the foundation. The Basilica of the Assumption was then built between 1618 and 1628 to the designs of Antonio Pallacini.

== Architecture ==
The complex is surrounded by a defensive wall. The church interior features Baroque and Rococo elements. Travel writers indicate that the organ is one of the finest in Poland. The organ was constructed over the course of five years.

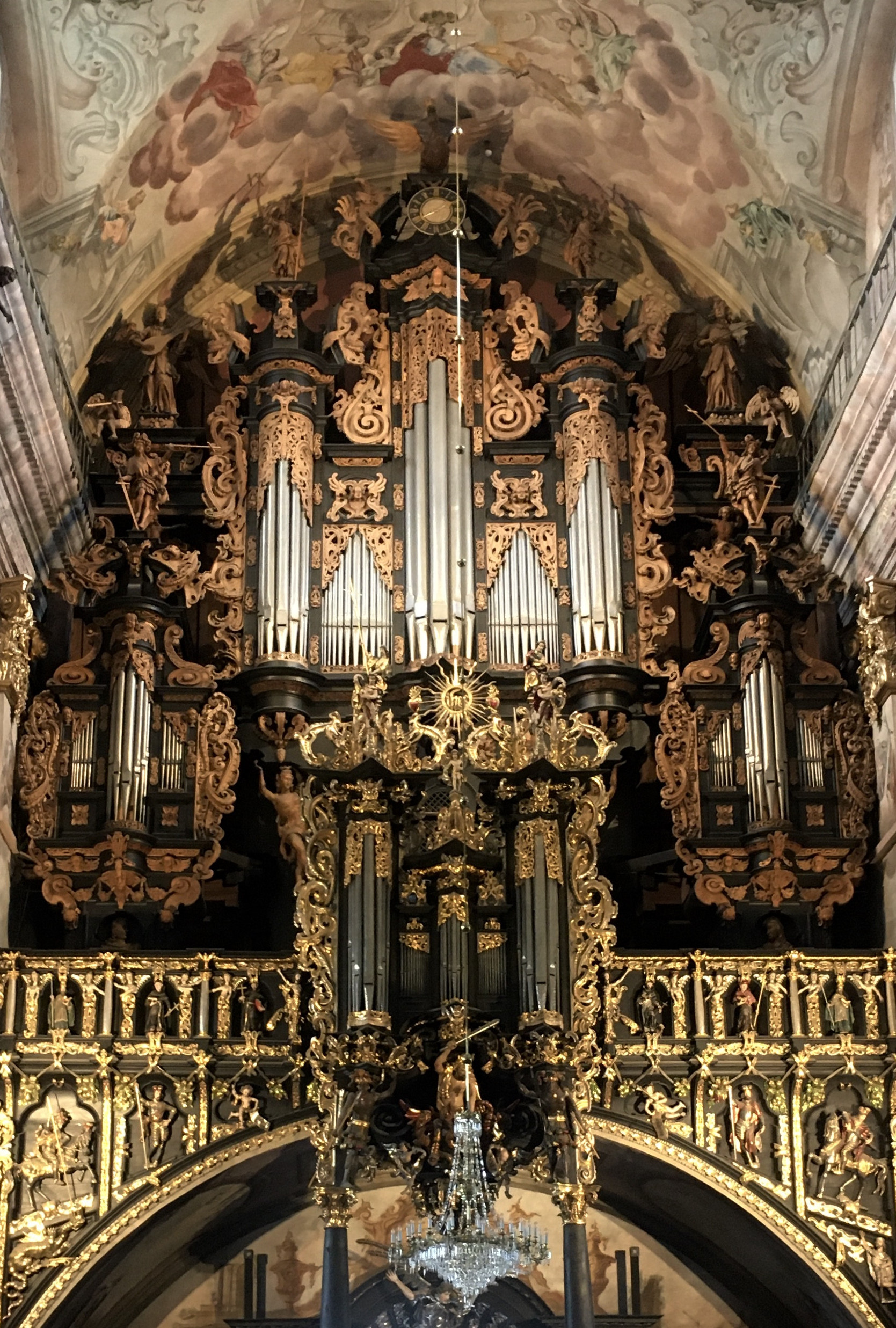
Organ

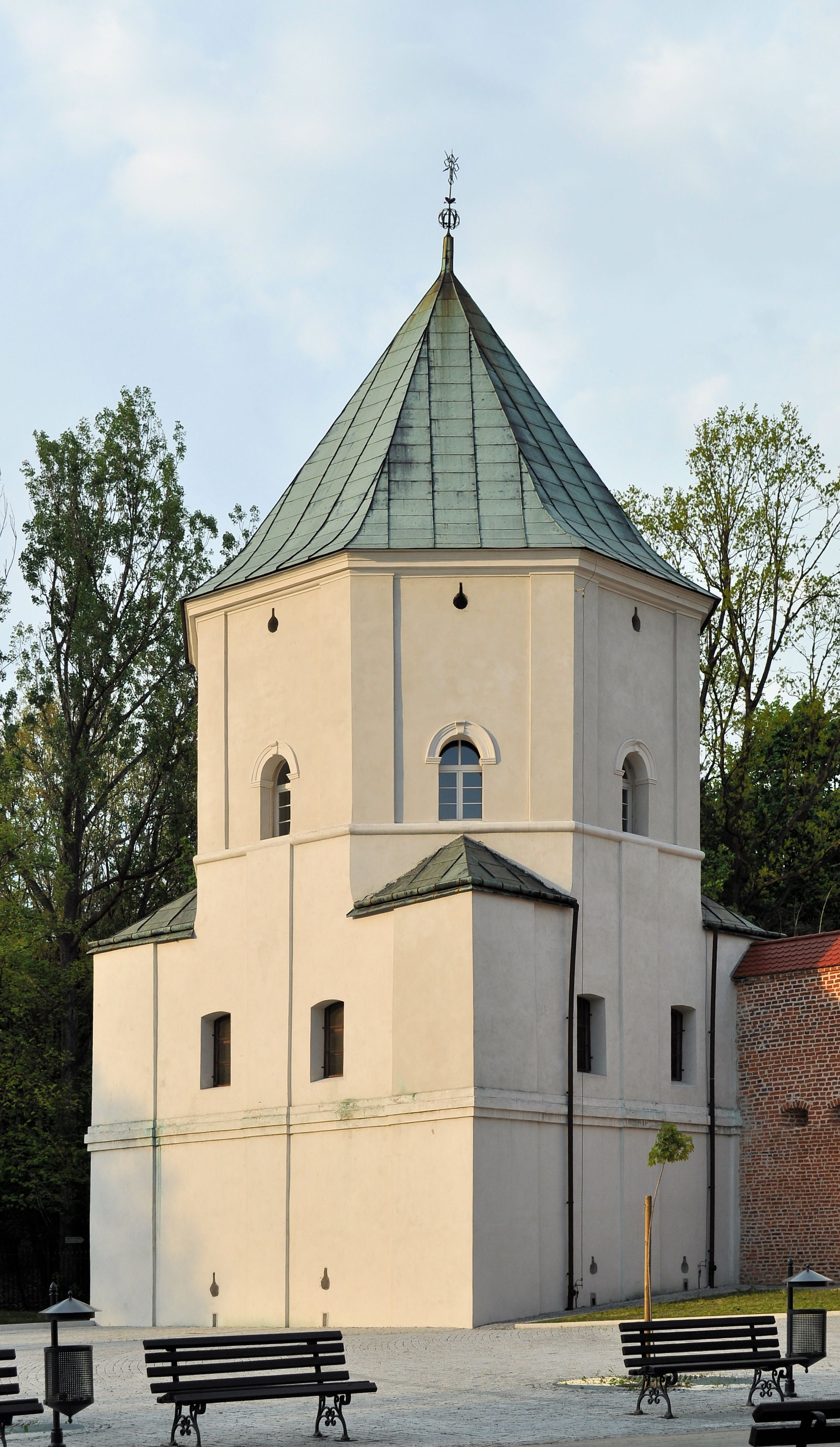
An exterior tower

== See also ==
- Bernardine Monastery Complex, a monastery in Radom
- Baroque in Poland
- The Most Holy Virgin Mary, Queen of Poland
