= Kamieniec Ząbkowicki Palace =

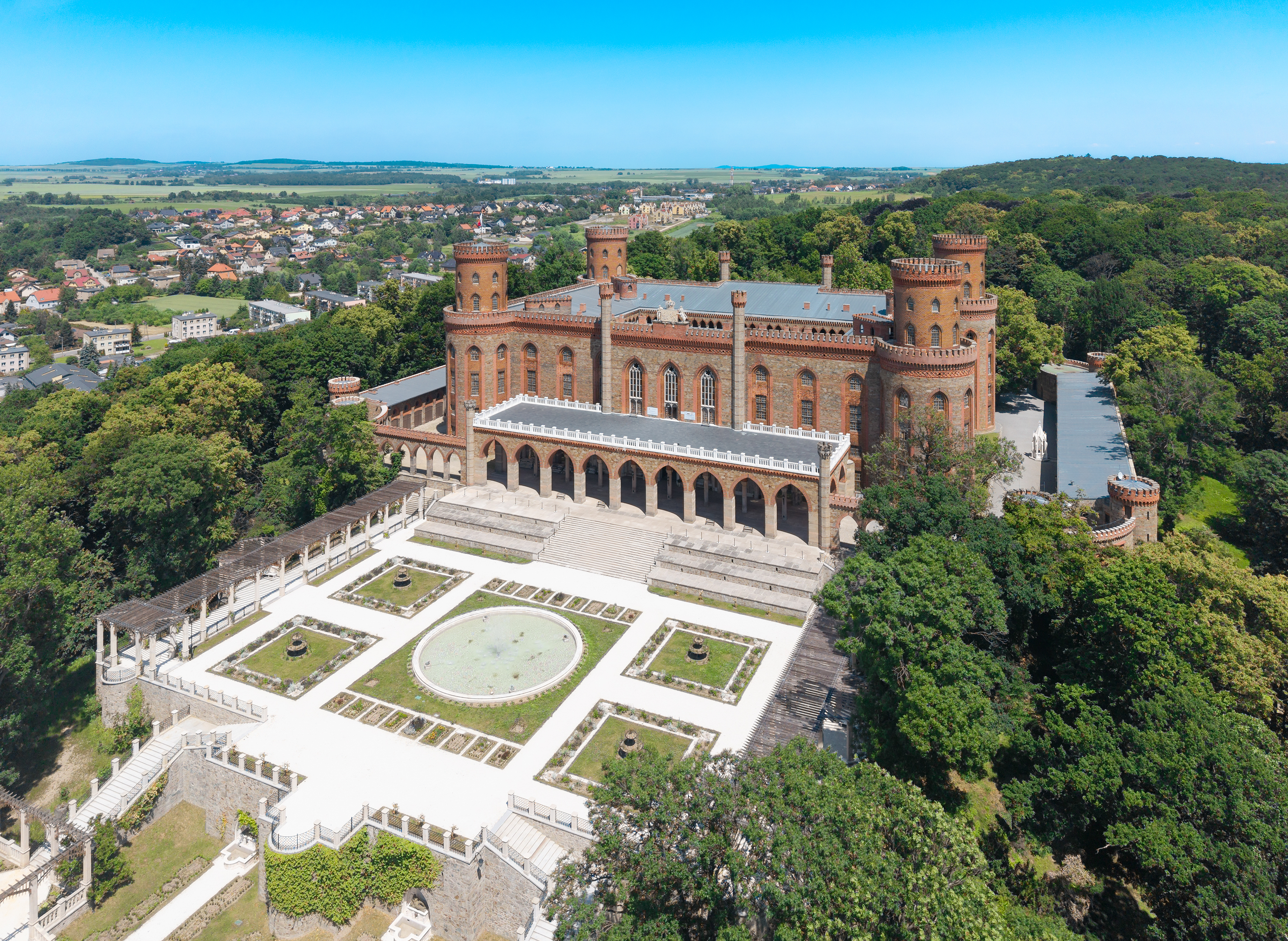
- South-western view, 2019

- Location of the Kamieniec Ząbkowicki Palace in Poland
- 50°31′14″N 16°52′51″E
- Location: Kamieniec Ząbkowicki, Lower Silesian Voivodeship, Poland

History
- Built: 1838–1872

Site notes
- Architect: Karl Friedrich Schinkel
- Architectural style: Neo-Gothic

Historic Monument of Poland
- Designated: 2024-03-19
- Part of: Kamieniec Ząbkowicki – architectural and landscape complex with the abbey and palace
- Reference no.: Dz. U. z 2024 r. poz. 410

The Kamieniec Ząbkowicki Palace (Polish: Pałac w Kamieńcu Ząbkowickim, German: Schloss Kamenz) is a 19th-century monumental palace in the form of a medieval castle, located in the town of Kamieniec Ząbkowicki, Lower Silesia, in southwestern Poland. It was designed by Karl Friedrich Schinkel in the Neo-Gothic architectural style for Princess Marianne of the Netherlands and completed in 1872 under the German Empire.

== History ==
The first owner of the Kamieniec Ząbkowicki Palace (then known as Schloss Kamenz) was Princess Marianne of the Netherlands, who in 1838, commissioned the construction of the palace to Karl Friedrich Schinkel. In 1848, construction works were halted due to Princess Marianne's divorce with Prince Albert of Prussia, only to be renewed in 1853. In 1858, the terrace gardens were designed by Peter Joseph Lenné, the General Director of Prussian Parks. In 1873, and with the marriage of Albrecht's son, Princess Marianne granted Albert property rights.

During World War II, the Germans used the palace complex as a transit station for ransacked art works. After 1945, the interior of the palace was either looted or devastated by Red Army soldiers, with part of the marble salvaged to construct the Congress Hall at the Palace of Culture and Science in Warsaw.

Presently, successive renovation works since 2013, financed by the Ministry of Culture and National Heritage of Poland have secured the property, opening the site to tourists.

== Architecture ==
The Neo-Gothic palace is located on a hill, towering above the town of Kamieniec to the east. The rectangular complex 75.3 meters in length by 48.3 meters in width. The four corner towers are 33.6 meters in height. The cloistered courtyard is approximately 19.5 by 18.2 meters. The palace itself is enclosed by a defensive wall with circular side bastions and turrets, giving it a medieval appearance. The large parkland features a Neoclassical mausoleum of the Hohenzollern family.

== Gallery ==
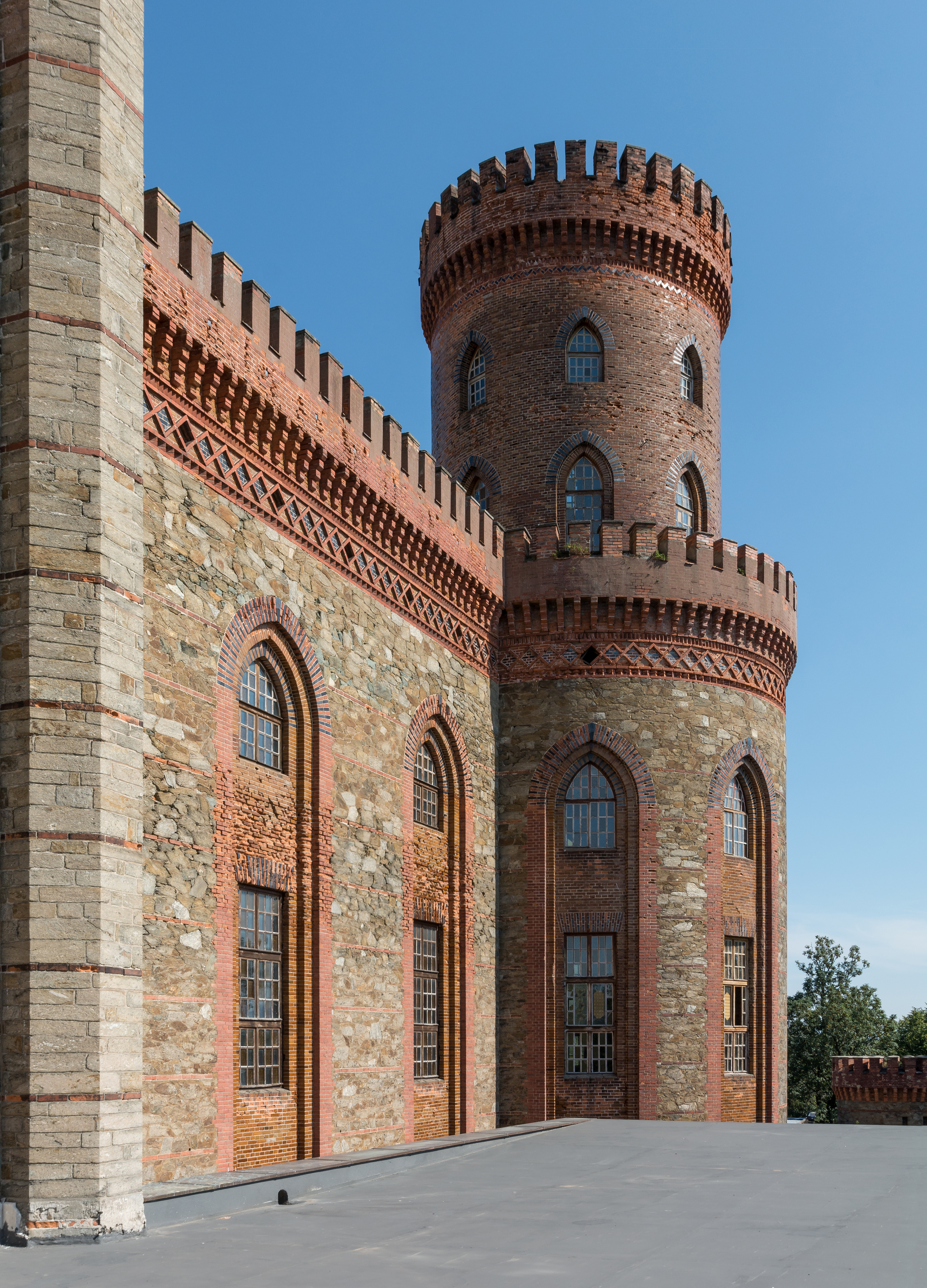
Tower

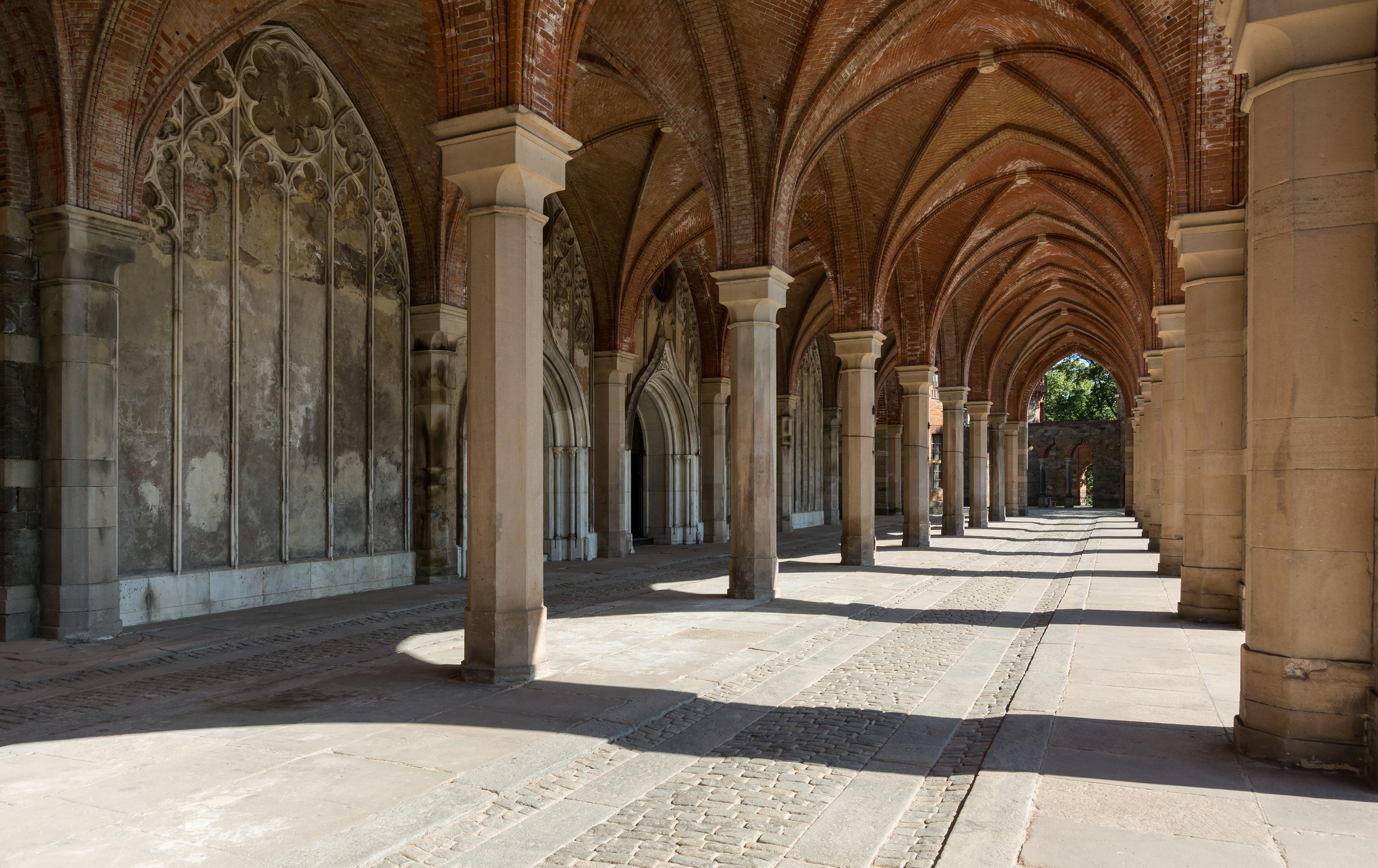
Cloister

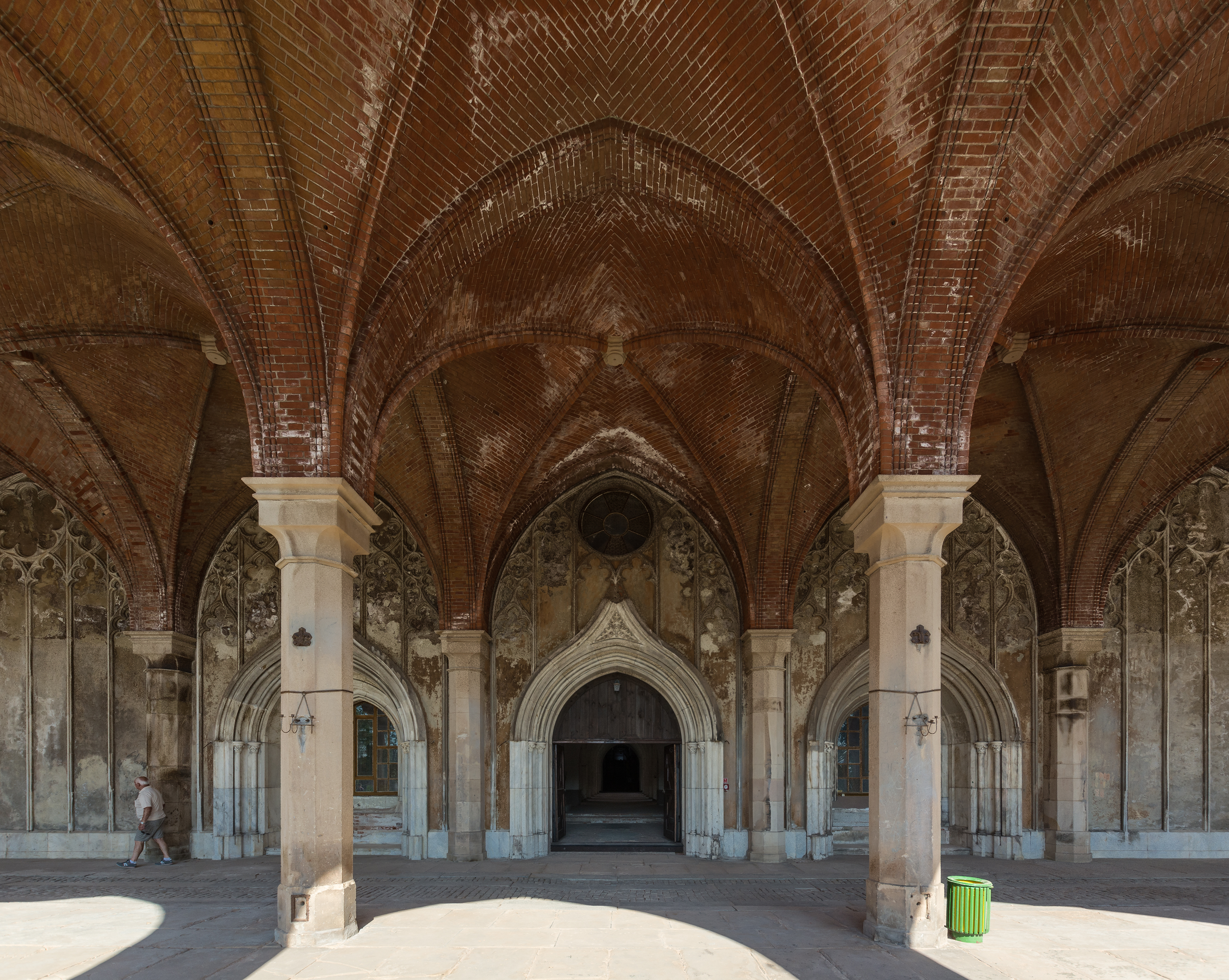
Main entrance

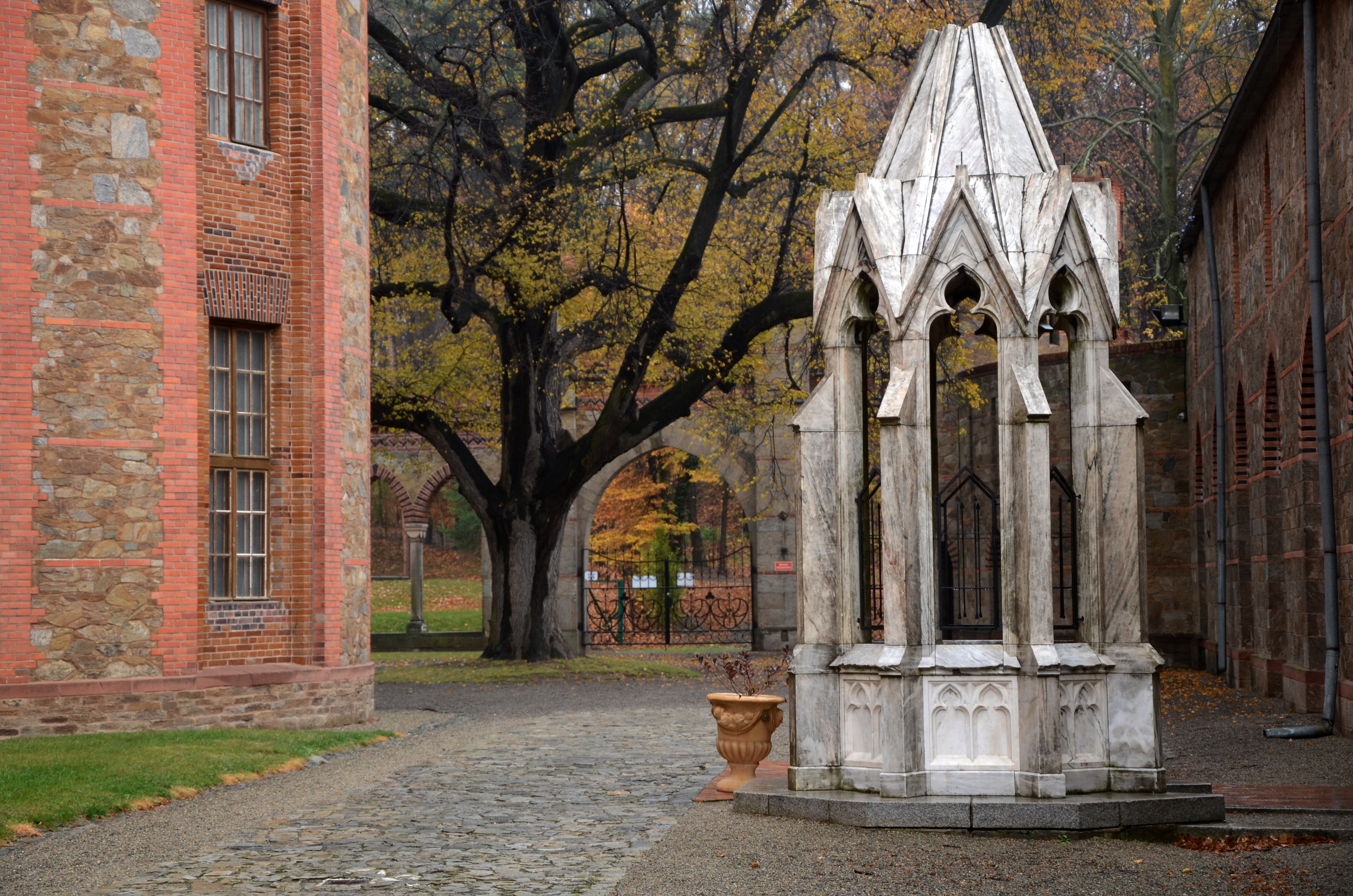
Neo-Gothic well

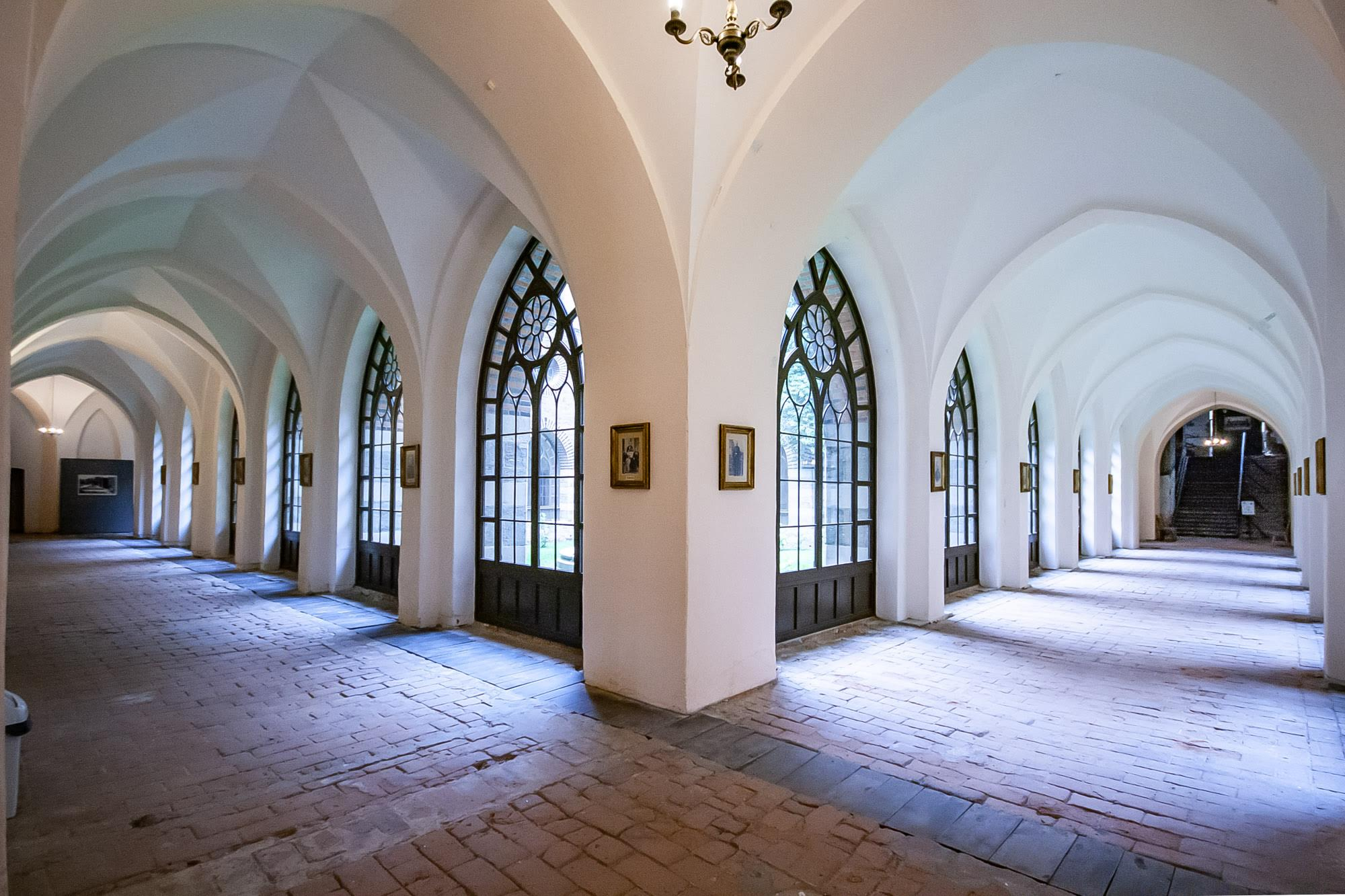
Corridor

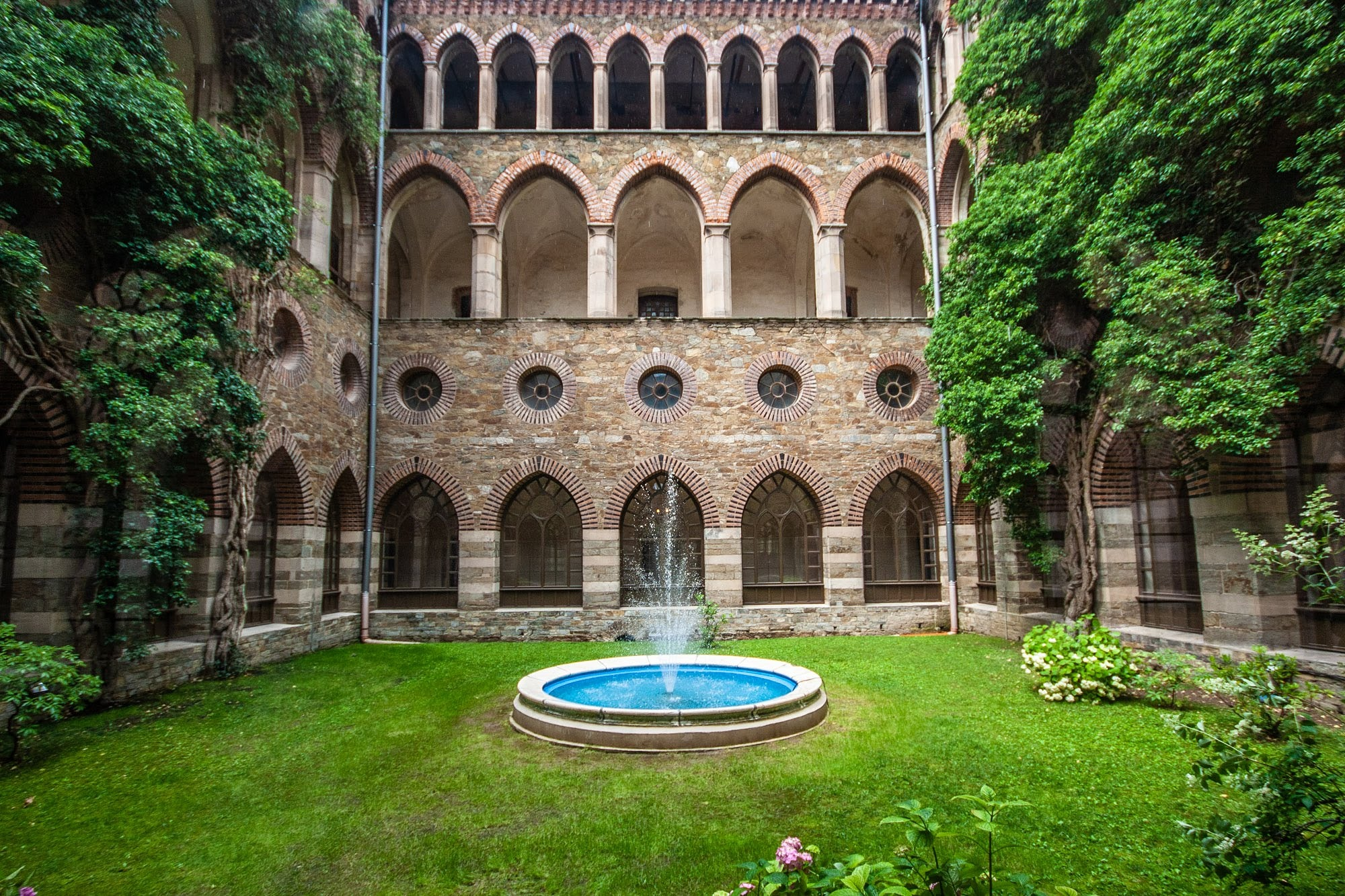
Cloistered Courtyard
