= Kamieniec Ząbkowicki =

- Town
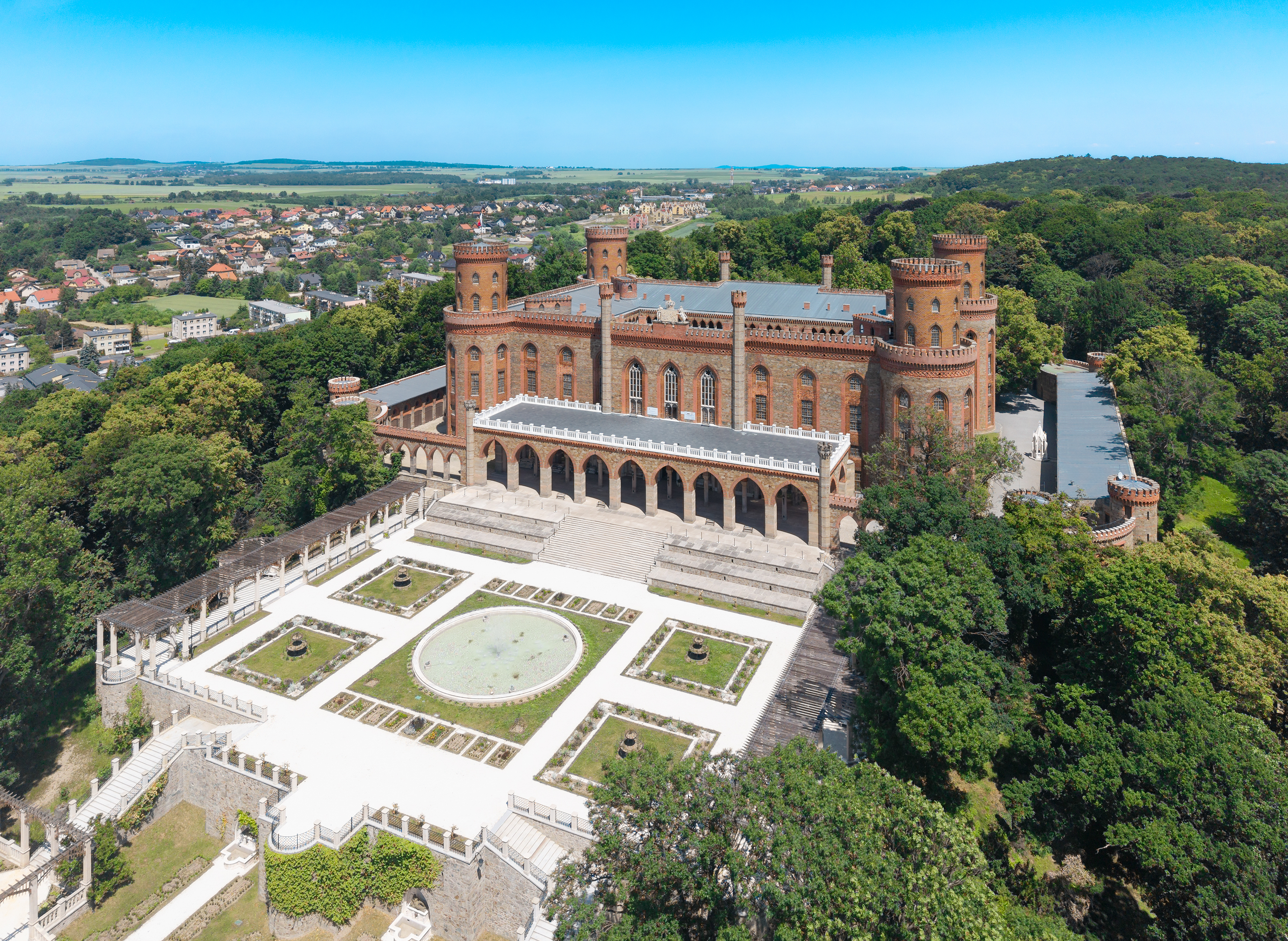
- Kamieniec Ząbkowicki Palace

- Coat of arms

- Location within Poland
- Coordinates: 50°31′35″N 16°52′41″E
- Country: Poland
- Voivodeship: Lower Silesian
- County: Ząbkowice
- Gmina: Kamieniec Ząbkowicki
- First mentioned: 12th century
- Town rights: 2021

Population
  - Total: 4,200
- Time zone: UTC+1 (CET)
  - Summer (DST): UTC+2 (CEST)
- Vehicle registration: DZA
- Website: kamienieczab.pl

Historic Monument of Poland
- Designated: 2024-03-06
- Part of: Kamieniec Ząbkowicki – architectural and landscape ensemble
- Reference no.: Dz. U., 2024, No. 410

Kamieniec Ząbkowicki [kaˈmjɛɲɛt͡s zɔmpkɔˈvit͡ski] (German: Kamenz N.S.) is a town in Ząbkowice County, Lower Silesian Voivodeship, in south-western Poland. It is the seat of the administrative district (gmina) called Gmina Kamieniec Ząbkowicki. The town is an important railway junction, located on the main line which links Wrocław with Kłodzko and Prague. In Kamieniec, this route crosses with the west-east connection from Jaworzyna Śląska to Kędzierzyn-Koźle. The village has a population of 4,200.

The architectural and landscape ensemble, containing the local landmarks, the abbey and palace, is a Historic Monument of Poland.

== History ==
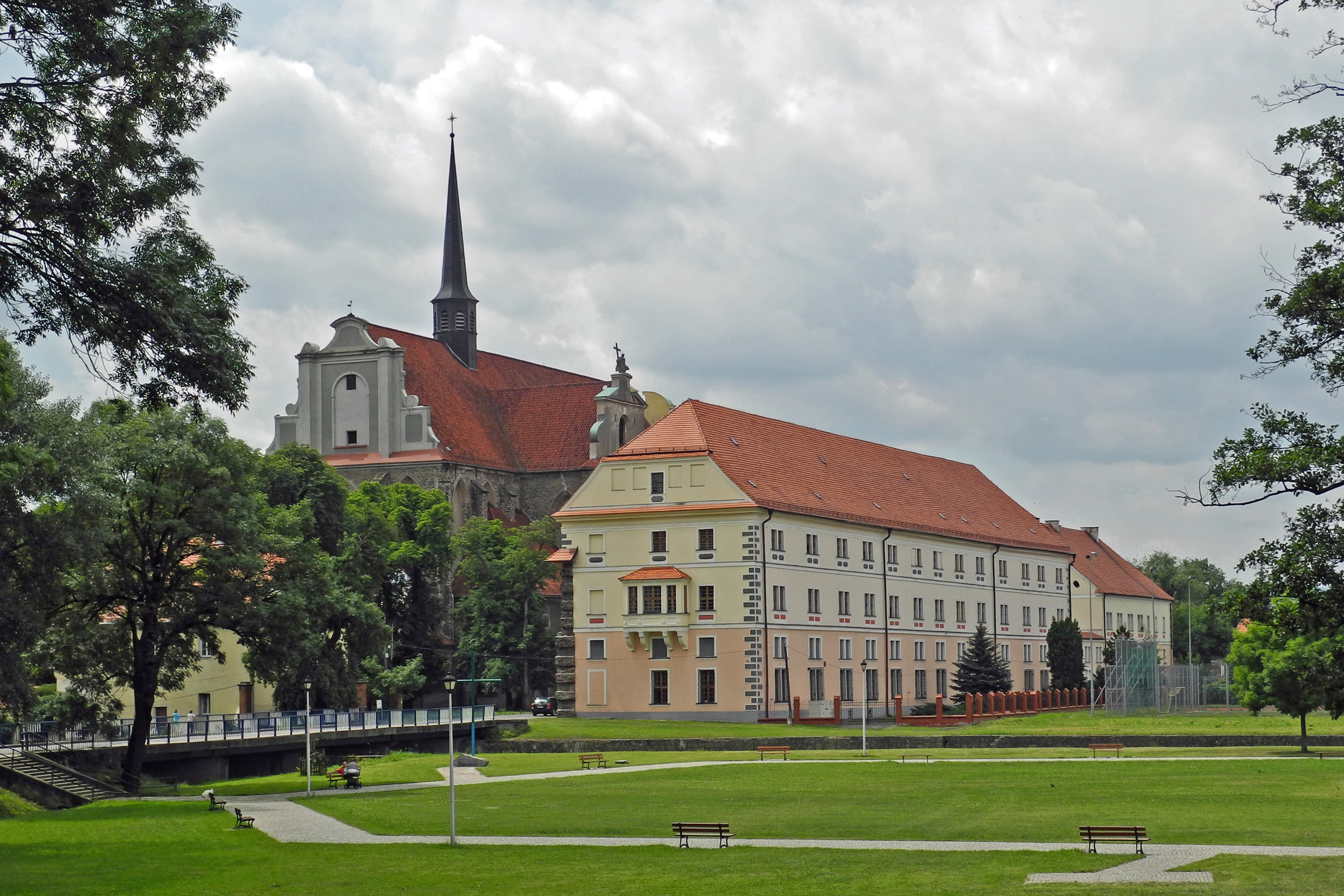
Kamieniec Abbey

The name of the town comes from the Polish word kamień, which means "stone". It was mentioned in the oldest Polish chronicle Gesta principum Polonorum from the early 12th century. The place is known for the former Kamieniec Abbey, established in 1209 as an Augustinian college by Bishop Wawrzyniec of Wrocław at the site of a former castle of Bretislaus II of Bohemia. It was then part of the Silesian Duchy of Piast-ruled Poland. In 1247 it became a filial monastery of the Cistercian Lubiąż Abbey.

King Frederick II of Prussia hid here from Habsburg troops on 27 February 1741 during the First Silesian War. Following the war, the village fell under Prussian suzerainty. Secularized in 1810 by order of King Frederick William III of Prussia, the estates of Kamieniec (then under the Germanized name Kamenz) were acquired by Wilhelmine of Prussia, wife of King William I of the Netherlands. Between 1838 and 1873 their daughter Princess Marianne of the Netherlands and her husband Prince Albert of Prussia had a new palace built in a Neogothic style according to the plans of Karl Friedrich Schinkel.

In 1871 the settlement became part of Germany, and during World War II Nazi Germany carried out murders of mentally ill children by involuntary euthanasia in the local monastery building (see: Aktion T4). In the final stages of the war, the palace was plundered and set on fire by the occupying Soviet Red Army.

Following the war, in 1945, the village became again part of Poland, and the adjective Ząbkowicki (after the nearby town and county seat of Ząbkowice Śląskie) was added to the name to distinguish it from other settlements of the same name, which are very common throughout Poland. The palace was restored in 1995.

In July 2020, Kamieniec Ząbkowicki received town rights with effect from 2021.

== Sports ==
The local football team is Zamek Kamieniec Ząbkowicki. It competes in the lower leagues.

== Gallery ==
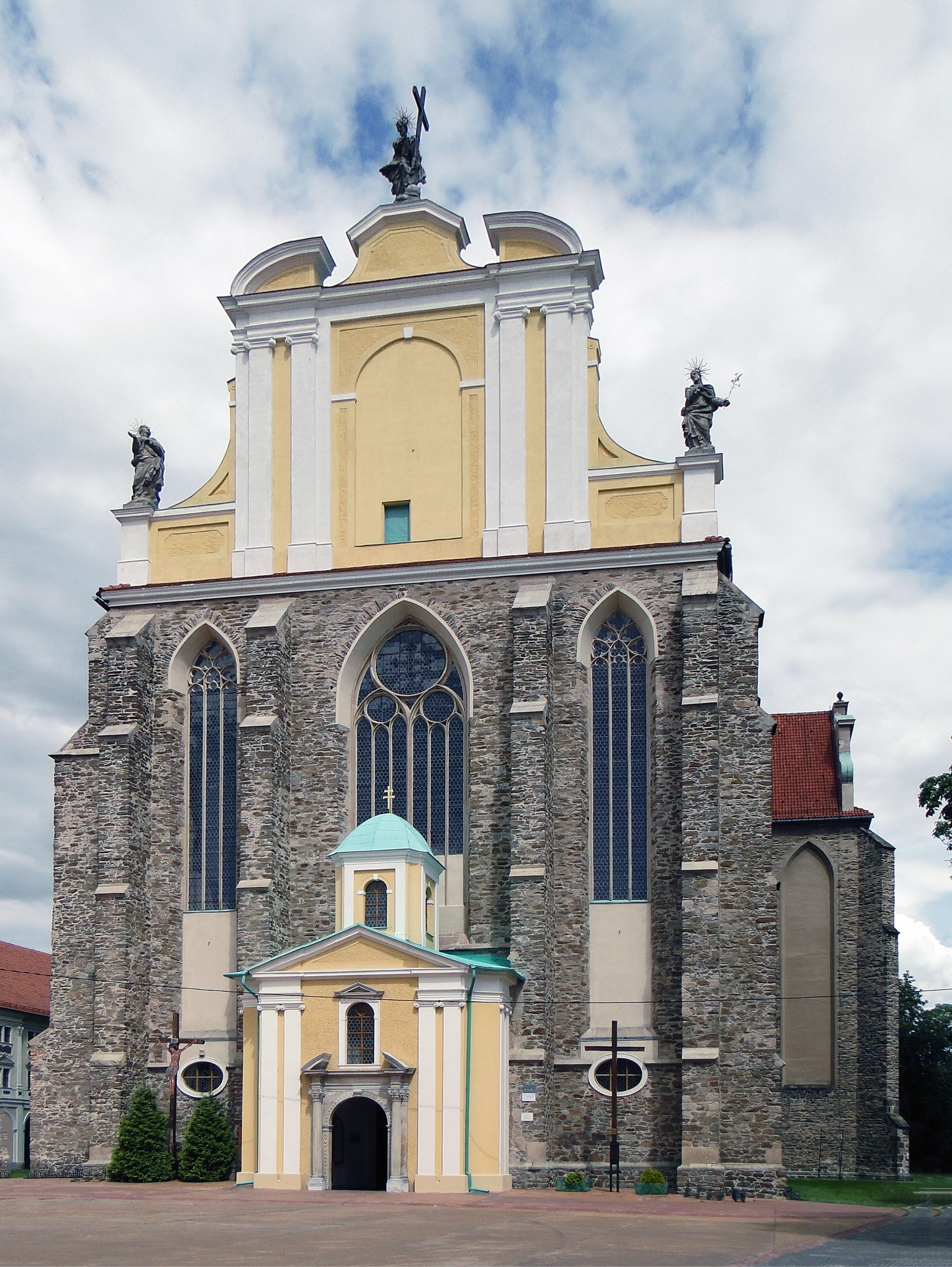
Gothic-Baroque Church of the Assumption

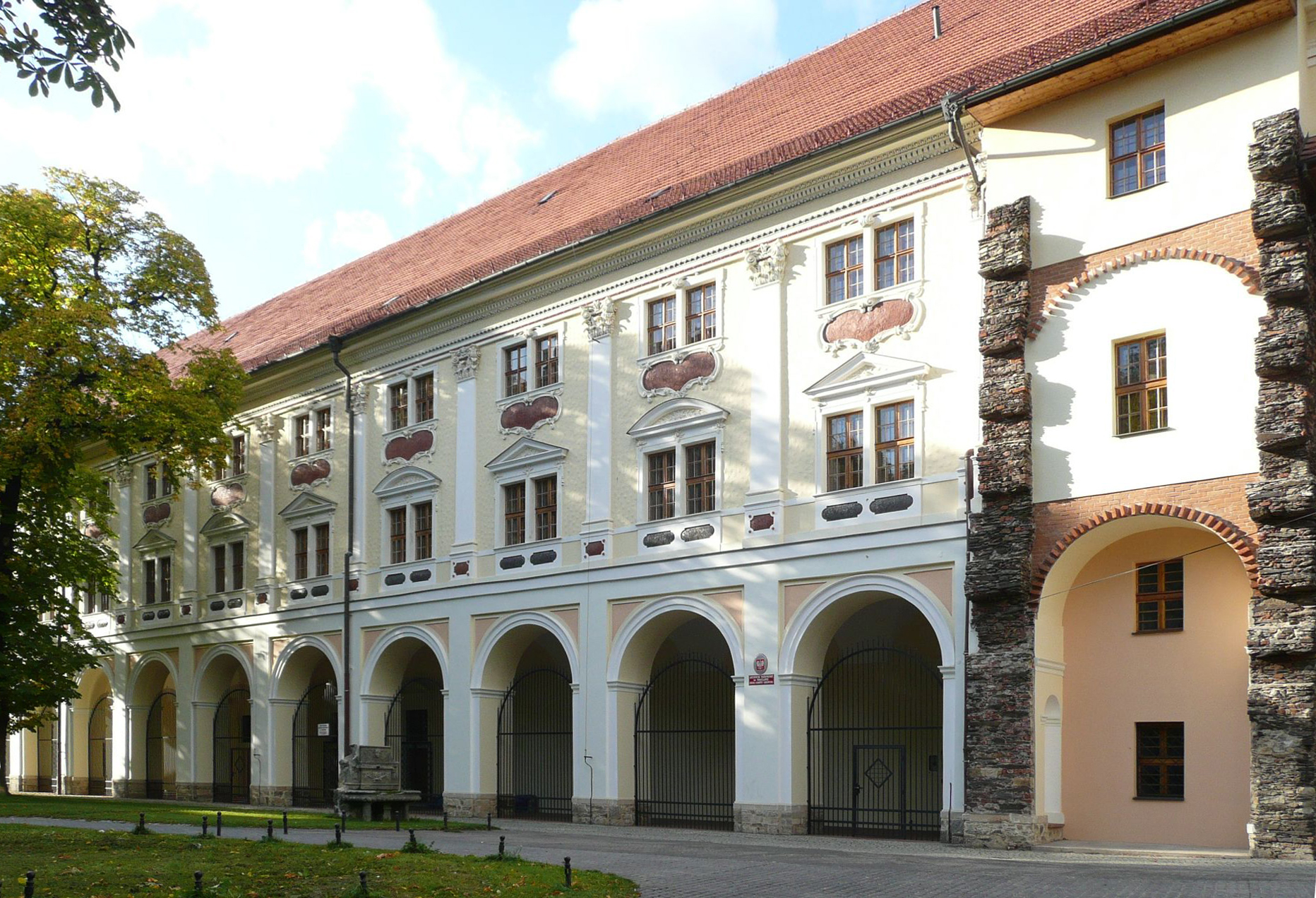
Abbey building, now the Polish state archive

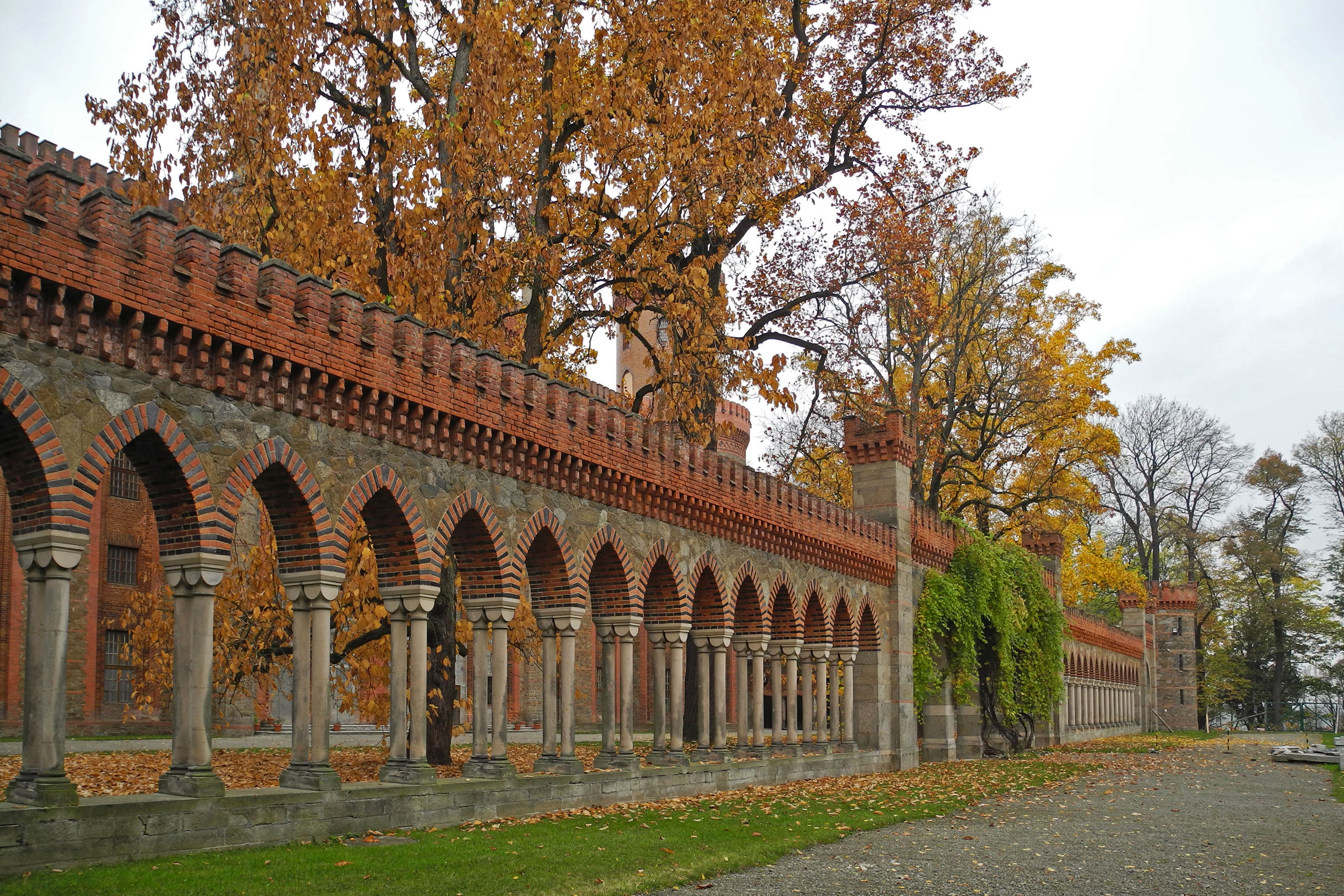
Palace park

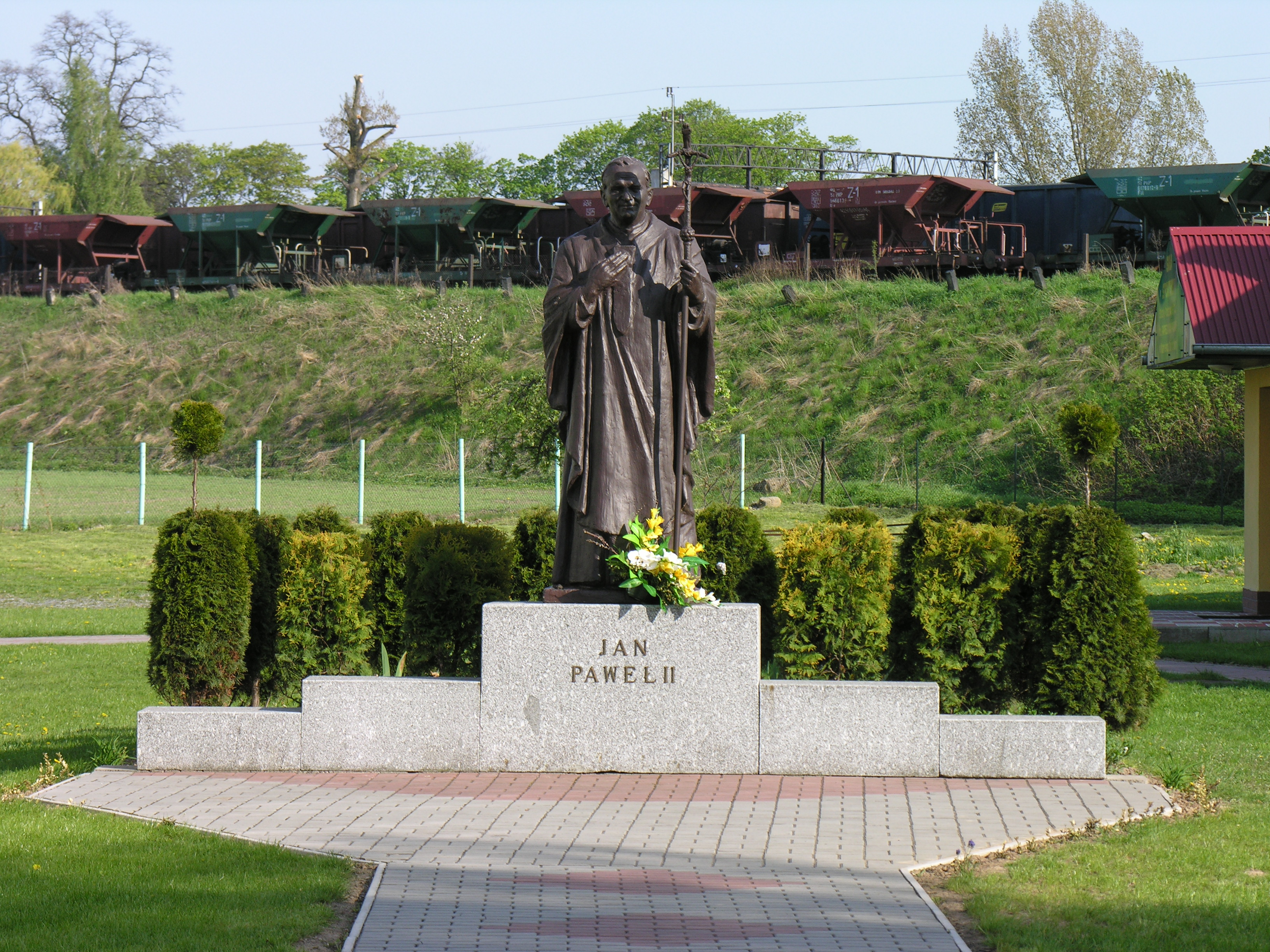
Monument of Pope John Paul II

== Surroundings ==
- Gola Dzierżoniowska Castle
- Medieval town of Niemcza
- Cistercian monastery at Henryków
- Wojsławice Arboretum
