= Święta Lipka Sanctuary =

- Basilica of the Visitation of the Blessed Virgin Mary
- Holy Linden Basilica
- Bazylika Nawiedzenia Najświętszej Maryi Panny
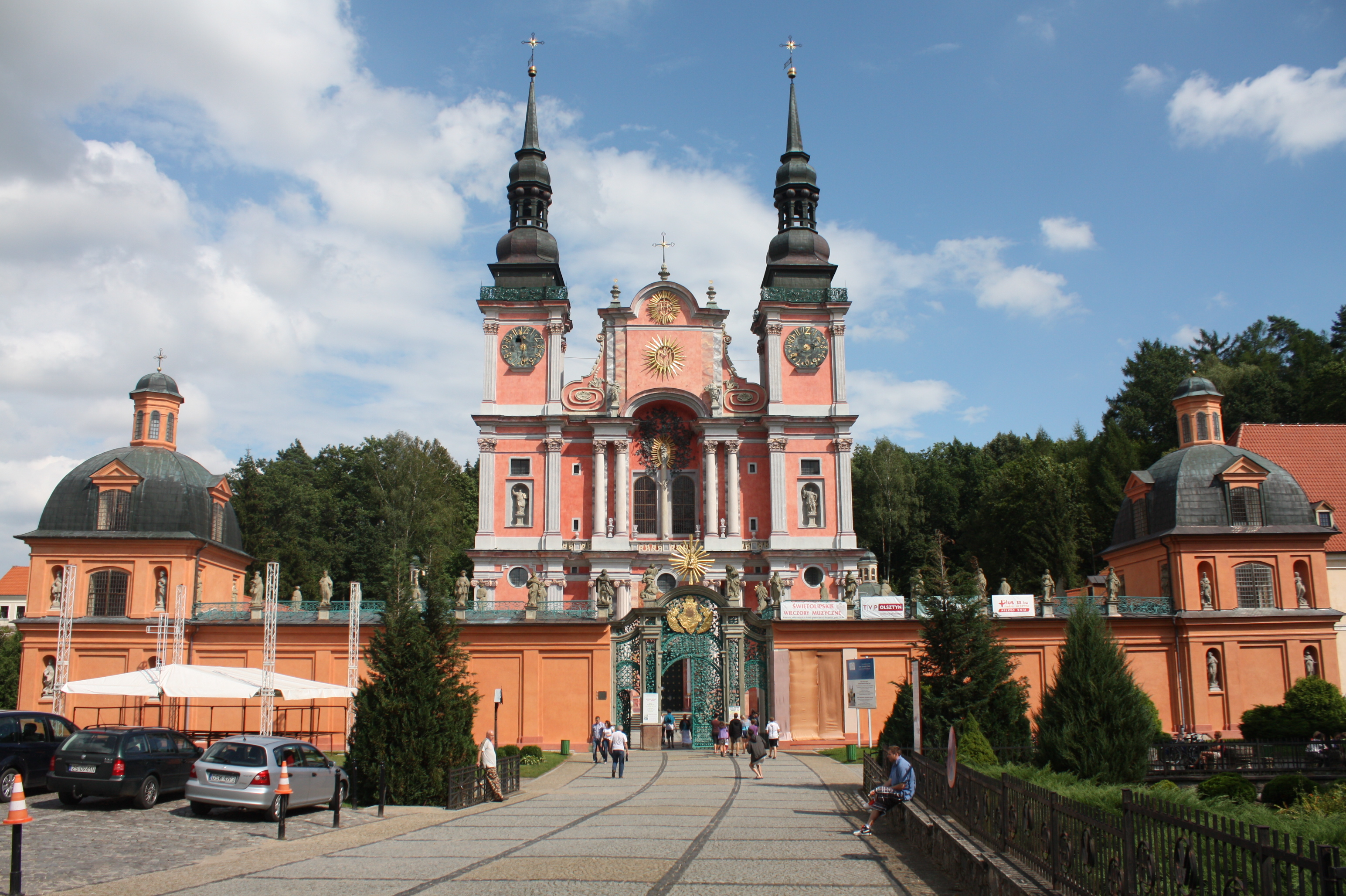
- The basilica in 2012
- Święta Lipka Sanctuary
- 54°1′32.44″N 21°12′52.48″E
- Location: Święta Lipka
- Country: Poland
- Denomination: Roman Catholic
- Website: Link

History
- Founder: Society of Jesus
- Dedication: The Most Holy Virgin Mary, Queen of Poland
- Consecrated: 15 August 1693

Architecture
- Functional status: Active
- Style: Baroque
- Years built: 1688-1693

Historic Monument of Poland
- Designated: 2018-04-20
- Reference no.: Dz. U. z 2018 r. poz. 961

Święta Lipka Sanctuary (Polish: Sanktuarium w Świętej Lipce), in English known as the Holy Linden, is a Roman Catholic basilica located in the small village of Święta Lipka, in northeastern Poland. It is a pilgrimage site and a holy shrine dedicated to the Virgin Mary. Built during the late 17th century, the basilica is an example of Baroque architecture in Poland and in the world. It is also known for its moving pipe organ.

== History ==
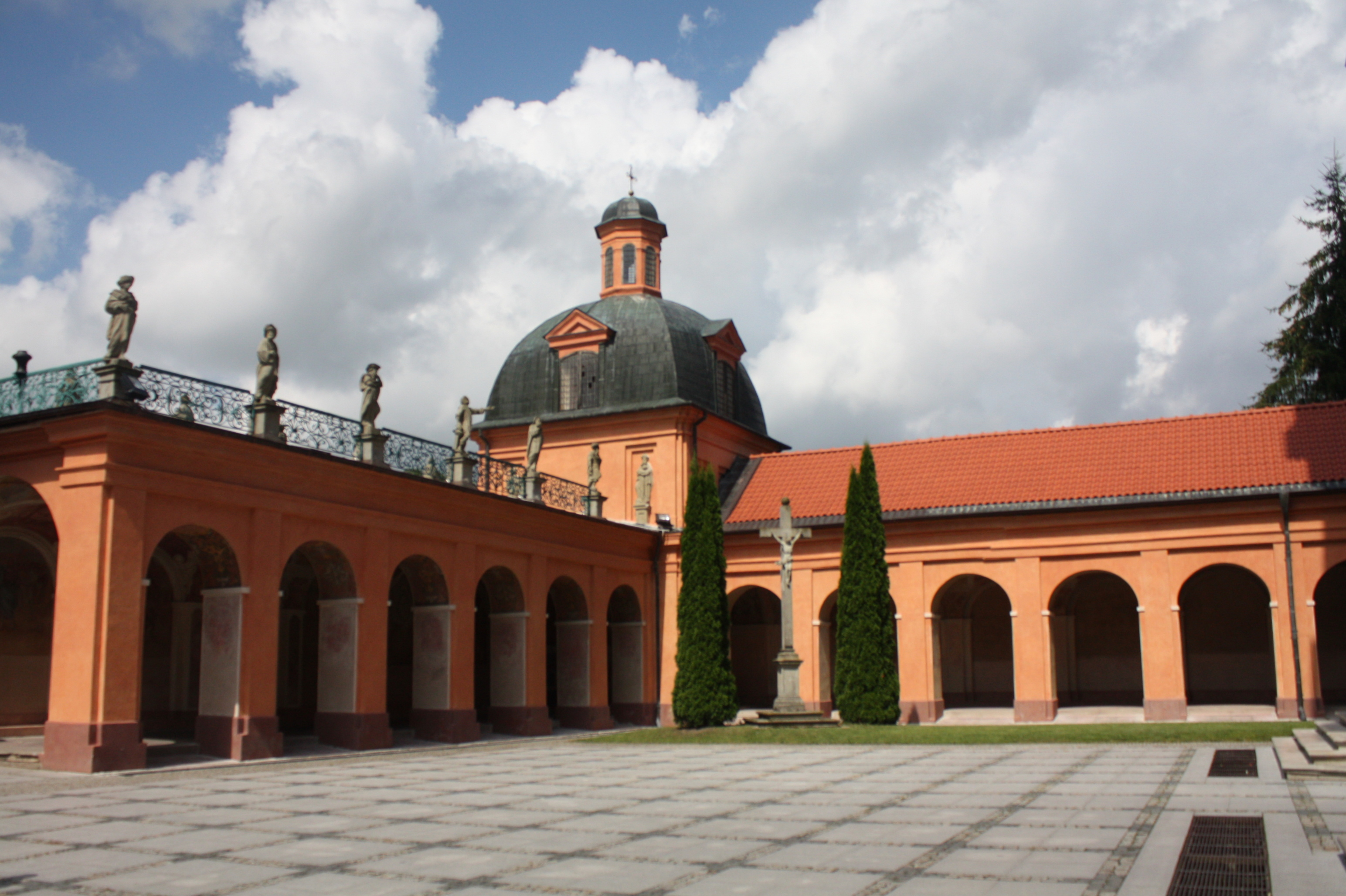
Cloisters

The semi-legendary cult was cultivated by locals since the 1300s, when a petty criminal carved a figurine of Mary in the nearby Kętrzyn prison following a Marian apparition. He was then unexpectedly released and en route to Reszel he placed the figurine on a linden tree as a sign of gratitude. The object was said to work wonders and had healing properties. Albert, Duke of Prussia, visited the sacred place while pilgrimaging barefoot from Königsberg in 1519. This tradition was also previously observed by the Teutonic Knights.

The medieval shrine was destroyed during the Protestant Reformation in around 1524 and gallows were placed in the same spot to scare off the Catholic worshipers. Almost a century later it was rebuilt by the personal secretary of king Sigismund III, who purchased the land where the missing figurine once stood. A painting of Mary with Baby Jesus by a Belgian master painter Bartholomew Pens from Elbing replaced the lost relic. During the Swedish Deluge, many of the priceless items from the chapel's treasury were hidden in Gdańsk (Danzig) and survived the turmoil. As Catholicism remained the dominant religion in the nearby of Warmia (Ermland), devotees from across the Polish–Lithuanian Commonwealth regularly journeyed to the place, particularly from Warsaw and Vilnius.

To this day, the pilgrimage route from the town of Reszel to Święta Lipka is aligned with small Baroque shrines and linden trees, dating back to the 18th century.

== Basilica ==
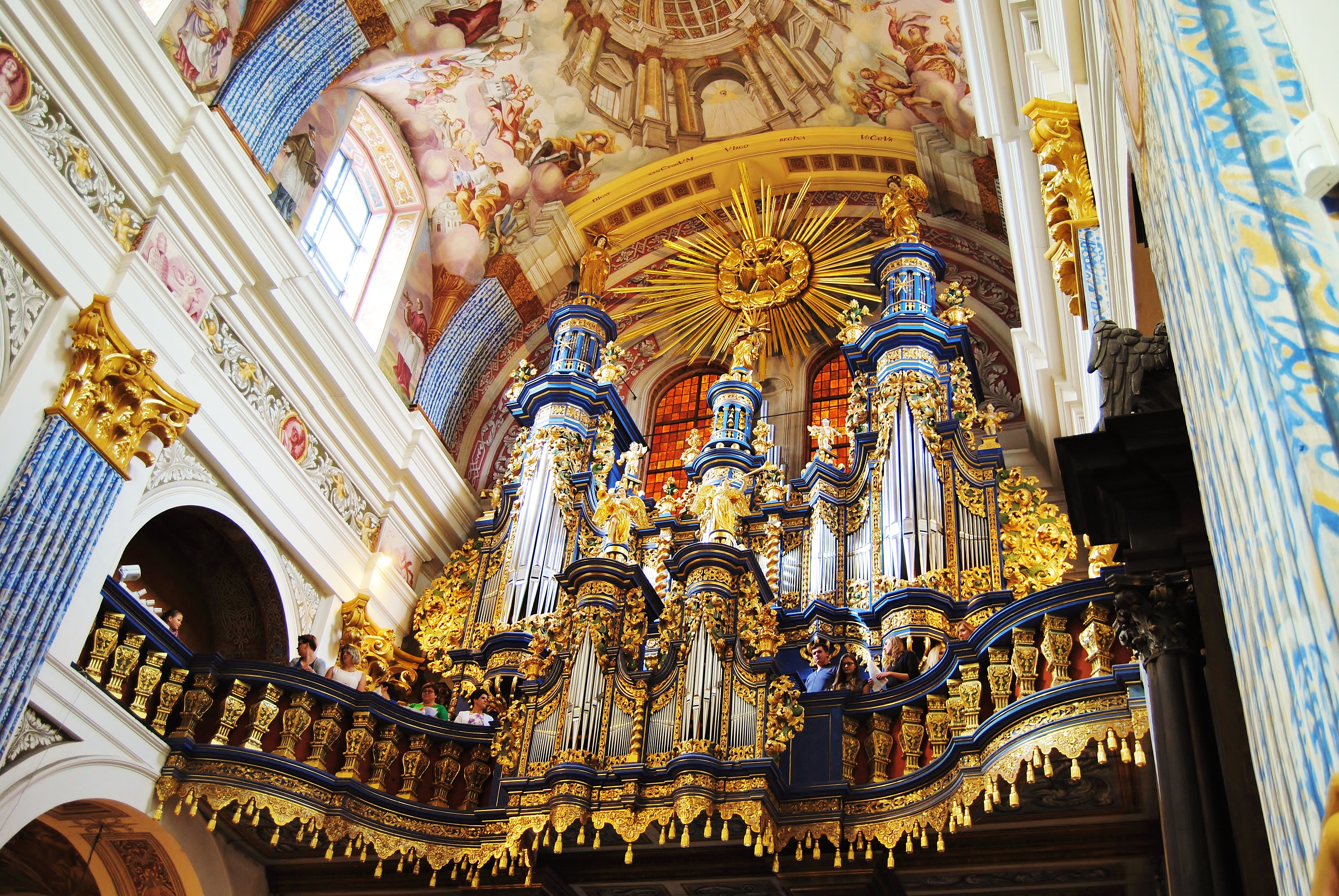
The moving pipe organ

The church and convent were founded by the Society of Jesus and construction was initiated by Polish Cardinal Michał Stefan Radziejowski in 1688. The temple's consecration occurred on 15 August 1693. Due to the large number of arriving pilgrims, the facility was significantly enlarged over the years and a fortified cloister with domed tower-like chapels was completed in 1708, giving the overall structure a defensive appearance. The elaborate interior took over 50 years to be entirely finished and furnished. The church was further embellished with decoration through donations made by wealthy notables or pious monarchs such as Ladislaus IV, Queen Marie Casimire or Stanislaus I Leszczyński and his wife Catherine.

The monumental altar was made between 1712 and 1714. The object, composed of three main parts or storeys, is adorned by the gilded figures of saints and martyrs. John III Sobieski gifted a painting to the Jesuits after his victory at the Battle of Vienna and it was later incorporated into the altarpiece.

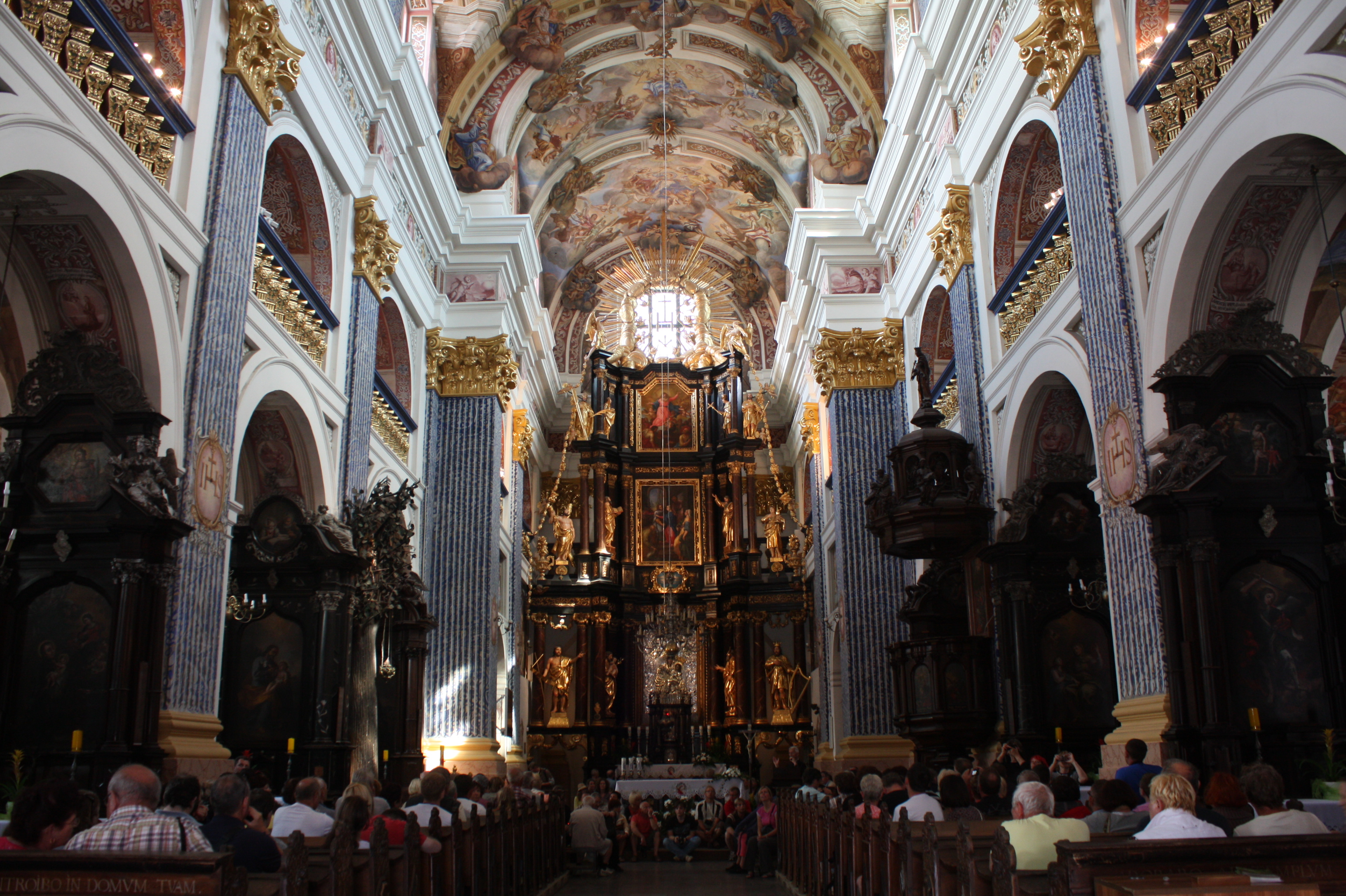
The interior with main altar and vault frescoes

The ornate paintwork and frescoes on the vault ceiling was completed in 1727. They feature images of Saint Casimir, Sigismund III and Hedwig of Silesia.

The most distinctive attribute and a treasure of the sanctuary is the moving pipe organ, erected in the years 1719-1721 by Johann Josua Mosengel. The decorative figures and sculptures move as the organ is being played. In 1944, it was damaged but repaired soon after.

The Jesuits were eventually removed from the Święta Lipka monastery by the Prussians after the Partitions of Poland in the 18th century. They returned to the convent in 1932. After World War II, when Warmia-Masuria returned to Poland under the Potsdam Agreement, Święta Lipka was transformed into an important sanctuary, alongside the Jasna Góra Monastery.

== See also ==
- List of Jesuit sites
