= Święta Lipka =

- Village
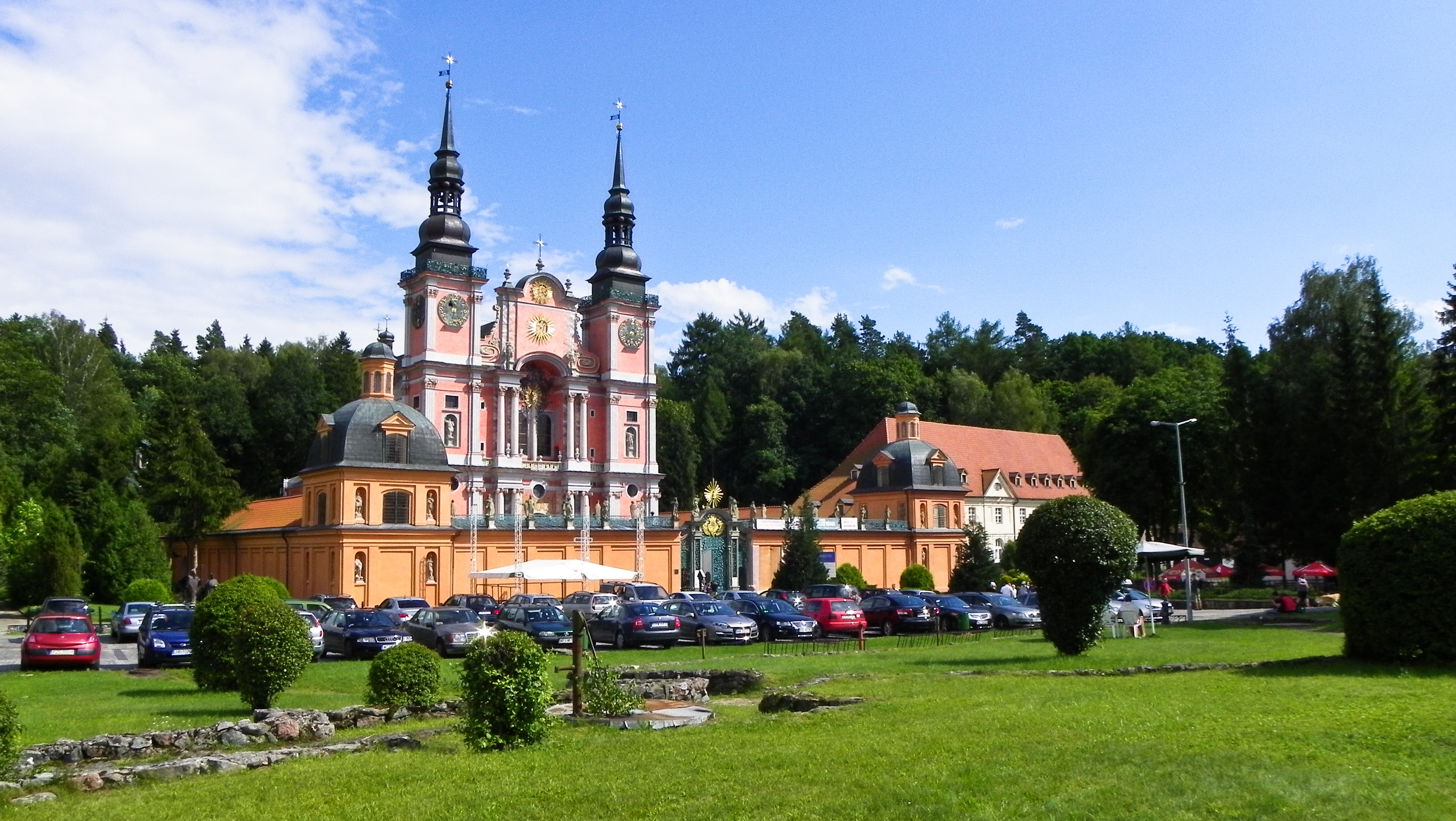
- Święta Lipka Sanctuary

- Location within Poland
- Coordinates: 54°2′N 21°13′E
- Country: Poland
- Voivodeship: Warmian-Masurian
- County: Kętrzyn
- Gmina: Reszel

Population
  - Total: 200
- Time zone: UTC+1 (CET)
  - Summer (DST): UTC+2 (CEST)
- Vehicle registration: NKE

Historic Monument of Poland
- Official name: Święta Lipka – pilgrimage sanctuary
- Designated: 2018-04-20
- Reference no.: Dz. U., 2018, No. 961

Święta Lipka (Polish: [ˈɕfjɛnta ˈlipka], German: Heiligelinde) is a small village in the administrative district of Gmina Reszel, within Kętrzyn County, Warmian-Masurian Voivodeship, in northeastern Poland. The village is located in the historic region of Masuria. Święta Lipka is known for the pilgrimage sanctuary and temple of Baroque architecture and its pipe organ, a Historic Monument of Poland.

== Sanctuary of St. Mary ==
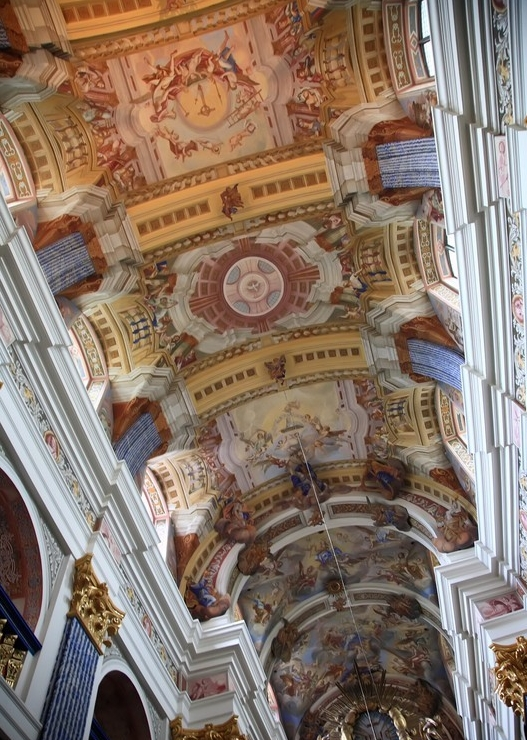
Nave of the church

According to legend, the name Heiligelinde and Święta Lipka - Holy Linden (lime tree) - referred to a tree with a wooden statue of Mary under which miracles took place; a legend exists that a convicted criminal carved a figurine of Mary and was released soon-after. As a sign of gratitude he placed the miraculous figurine on a linden tree, which had healing properties. The actual origin of the name may stem from a sacred grove of the Old Prussians.

A chapel at the site was first mentioned in a 1491 deed issued by Johann von Tiefen, then Grand Master of the Teutonic Knights. It was then part the Kingdom of Poland as a fief held by the Teutonic Knights. At this time it was already a pilgrimage site, with an inn. It was destroyed about 1525 during the Protestant Reformation, during which the region became Lutheran.

Although the village lay in the Protestant region of Masuria, the Roman Catholic faith was again approved in the Duchy of Prussia in 1605. The chapel was rebuilt by the Jesuits and consecrated in 1619 by the Warmian prince-bishop Szymon Rudnicki and became a popular pilgrimage site among the Roman Catholic populace of the surrounding counties and other parts of the Polish–Lithuanian Commonwealth, as well as the Lutheran Masurians. Among the 17th-century pilgrims was Polish King Władysław IV Vasa. In 1688, Warmian Bishop Michał Stefan Radziejowski laid the cornerstone of a new, great Baroque church, which was consecrated in 1693 by his successor, Bishop Jan Stanisław Zbąski. From the 18th century the village was part of the Kingdom of Prussia. The Jesuit monastery was abolished, and King Frederick II of Prussia allowed the Jesuits to stay only as secular administrators of the church complex. Franciszek Ksawery Rymkiewicz became the first post-Jesuit parish priest. From 1871 to 1945 the village was part of Germany, administratively located within the province of East Prussia. After the defeat of Nazi Germany in World War II, in 1945, the village along with Masuria became again part of Poland.
