= Ozimek Suspension Bridge =

Ozimek Suspension Bridge Most wiszący w Ozimku
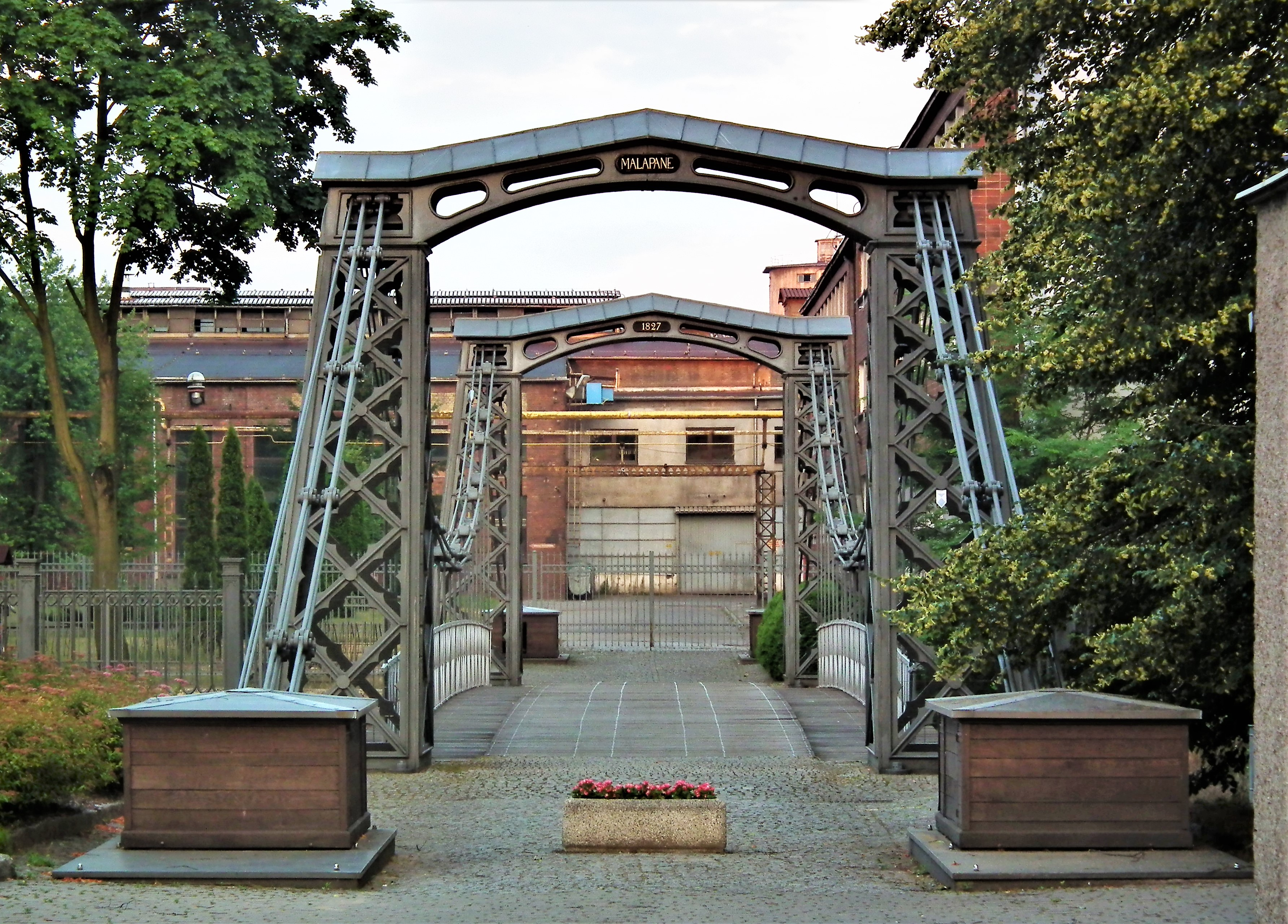
- Coordinates: 50°40′35″N 18°12′44″E
- Carries: Pedestrians
- Crosses: Mała Panew River
- Locale: Ozimek, Poland

Characteristics
- Design: Suspension bridge
- Material: Wrought iron and Steel
- Total length: 31.5 metres (103 ft)
- Width: 6.6 metres (22 ft)
- No. of spans: 1
- Load limit: 3 tons

History
- Designer: Karl Schottelius
- Constructed by: Malapane Steelworks
- Construction start: 1825
- Opened: 12 Sep 1827

Statistics

Historic Monument of Poland
- Designated: 2017-03-15
- Reference no.: Dz. U. z 2017 r. poz. 675

Location
- Interactive map of Ozimek Suspension Bridge

The Ozimek Suspension Bridge (Polish: Most wiszący w Ozimku) is a suspension bridge over the Mała Panew River in Ozimek, Poland. Designed by Karl Schottelius and completed in 1827, it is the second oldest wrought iron suspension bridge in Europe. The bridge was manufactured in a local Malapane Steelworks in Ozimek which supplied bridges to European cities from Berlin to Petersburg. It was constructed between 1825 and 1827 from parts made of 57 tons of wrought iron and 14 tons of steel. Suspended between two towers, on each side of the bridge, are four chain cables which support the span. The deck was made of timber. The bridge was used as a road bridge until 1938; then it continued to be used for pedestrian traffic only. The first extensive renovations of the bridge were carried out between July 2009 and September 2010. During the renovations the entire bridge was taken apart, renewed and put back together again, and its structure strengthened with steel cables.
