= Ozimek =

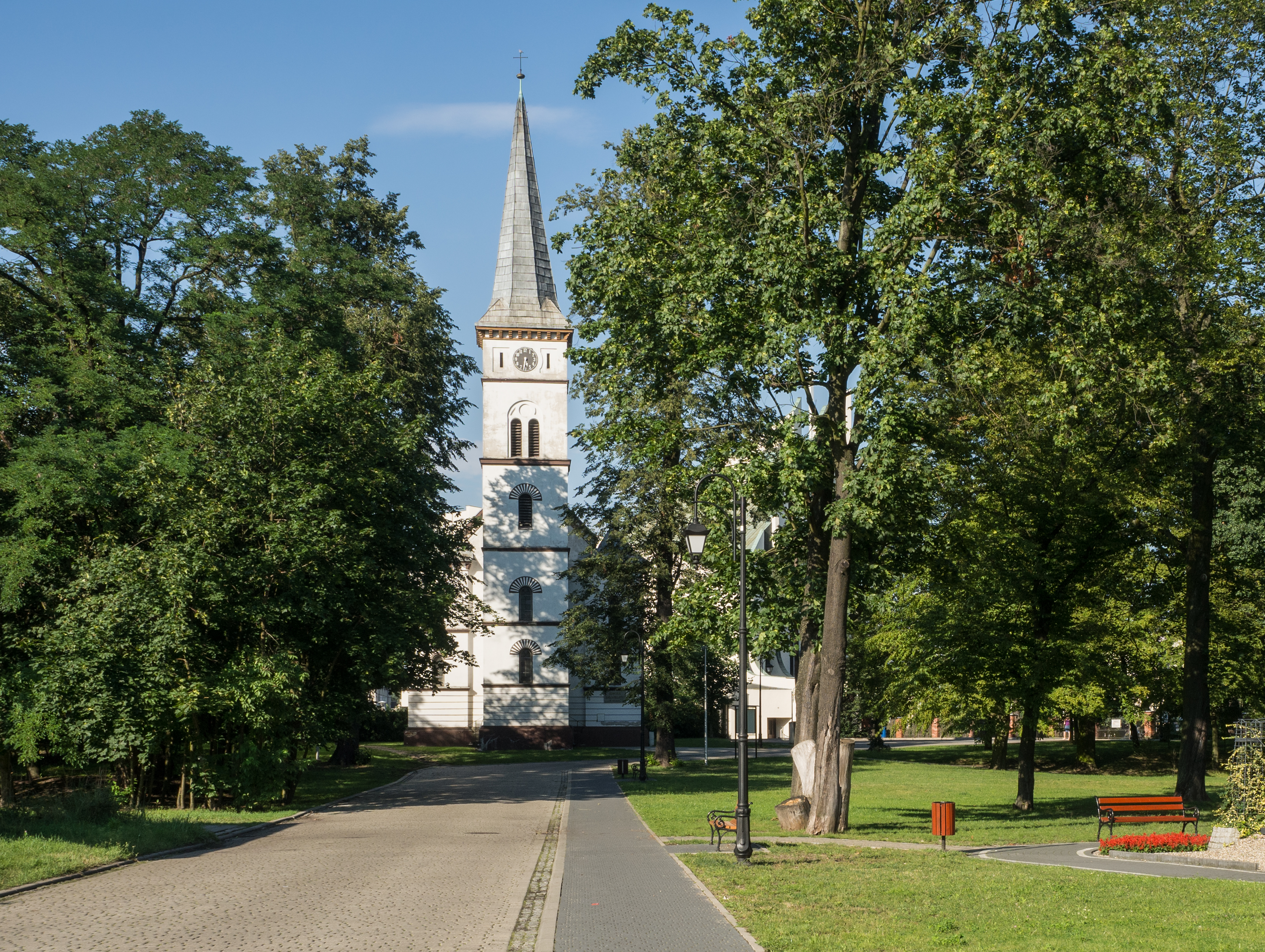
- Saint John the Baptist church

- Flag Coat of arms

- Location within Poland
- Coordinates: 50°40′23″N 18°12′47″E
- Country: Poland
- Voivodeship: Opole
- County: Opole
- Gmina: Ozimek
- Town rights: 1962

Government
  - Mayor: Mirosław Wieszołek

Area
  - Total: 3.25 km^{2} (1.25 sq mi)

Population (2019-06-30)
  - Total: 8,657
  - Density: 2,660/km^{2} (6,900/sq mi)
- Time zone: UTC+1 (CET)
  - Summer (DST): UTC+2 (CEST)
- Postal code: 46-040
- Area code: +48 77
- Vehicle registration plates: OPO
- Website: https://www.ozimek.pl

Ozimek [ɔˈʑimɛk] (German: Malapane; Silesian: Uoźimek) is a town in Opole County, Opole Voivodeship, in southern Poland, with 8,657 inhabitants (2019).

== History ==
Ozimek Suspension Bridge, a Historic Monument of Poland, and Huta Małapanew steelworks in the background

Ozimek dates back to an early modern settlement. It was named both Ozimek and Małapanew, with both names being of Polish origin. The former name is derived either from a local mill owner named Ozimek or from winter cereal (rośliny ozime in Polish), while the latter comes from the river Mała Panew. Polish Baroque poet Walenty Roździeński mentioned it under the latter name in his 1612 poem Officina ferraria, abo huta y warstat z kuźniami szlachetnego dzieła żelaznego.

In 1742 it was annexed by Prussia, and in German it was named Malapane. In 1753 the first steelworks in Silesia was opened there. In the mid-19th century, Ozimek was located on the major rail route Lubliniec–Opole and the town quickly developed. However, it was not officially incorporated as a town until 1962. From 1871 to 1945 it was part of Germany, although in the 19th century it was inhabited predominantly by Poles and Czechs, mostly of Catholic confession. During World War II the Germans established two forced labour camps and three prisoner of war labour units in the village. After the defeat of Nazi Germany in the war, Ozimek became part of Poland. The local populace was expelled.

Ozimek was granted town rights in 1962.

== Landmarks ==
Among objects of interest, there is the Ozimek Suspension Bridge, one of the oldest wrought iron suspension bridges in Europe, opened in 1827 and listed as a Historic Monument of Poland. There is also the Museum of Metallurgy of the Mała Panew Valley (Muzeum Hutnictwa Doliny Małej Panwi).

== Sports ==
Małapanew Ozimek football club is based in the town. It competes in the lower leagues. Polish international players Waldemar Sobota, Paweł Olkowski and Adam Ledwoń started their careers in the club.

== Twin towns – sister cities ==
See twin towns of Gmina Ozimek.
