= Bernardine Monastery Complex =

Monastery in Radom, Poland

Coordinates: 51.4014°N 21.1475°E

- zespół klasztorny Bernardynów
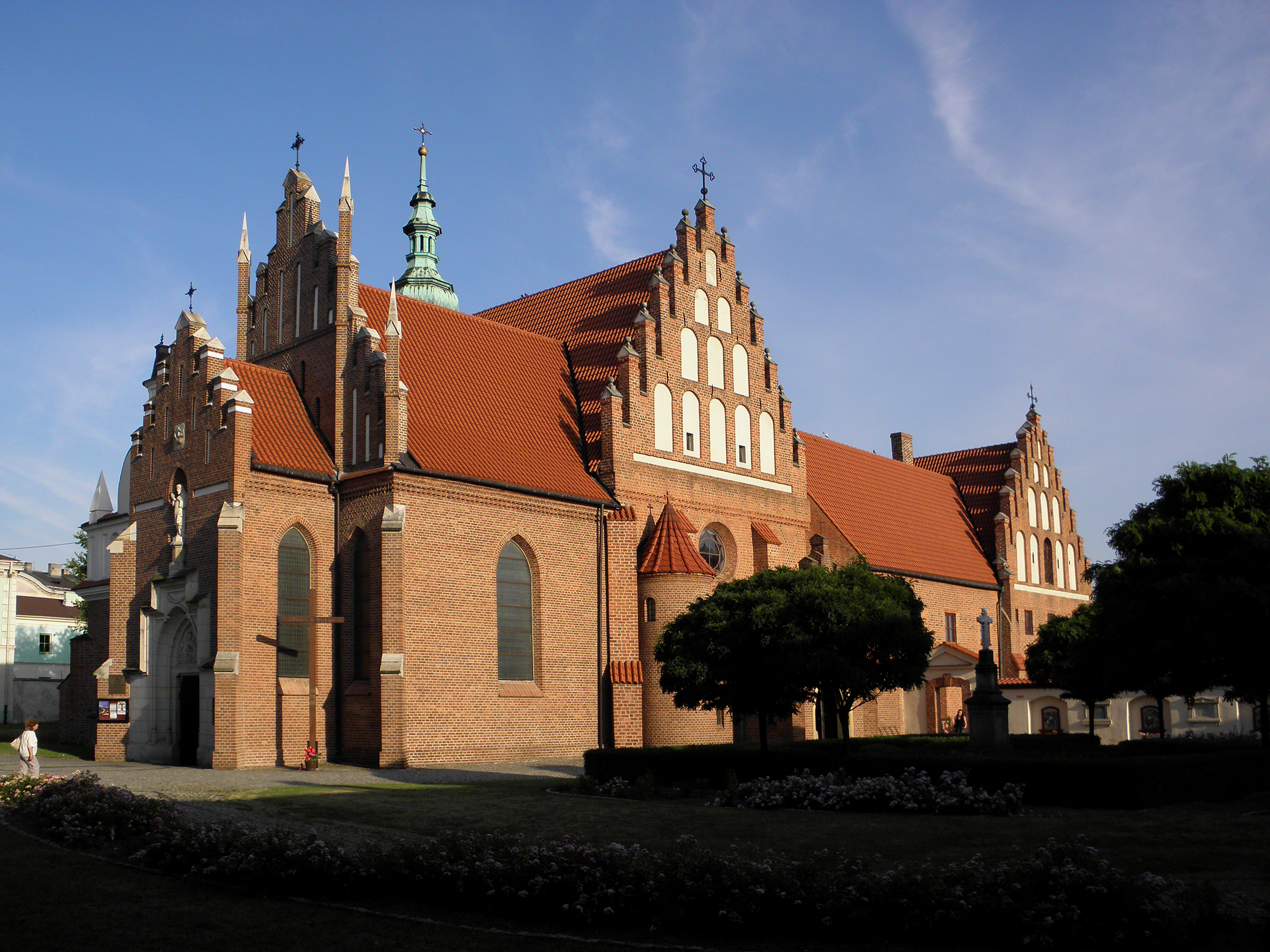
- Interactive map of Bernardine Monastery Complex

Monastery information
- Order: Cistercians
- Established: 15th century

Architecture
- Style: Gothic

Site
- Location: Radom
- Country: Poland

The Bernardine Monastery Complex (Polish: zespół klasztorny Bernardynów) is a Cistercian monastery in Radom, Poland. It is listed as a Historic Monument of Poland. Founded by King Casimir Jagiellon, the monastery has attracted the support of townspeople and nobility for centuries.

== History ==
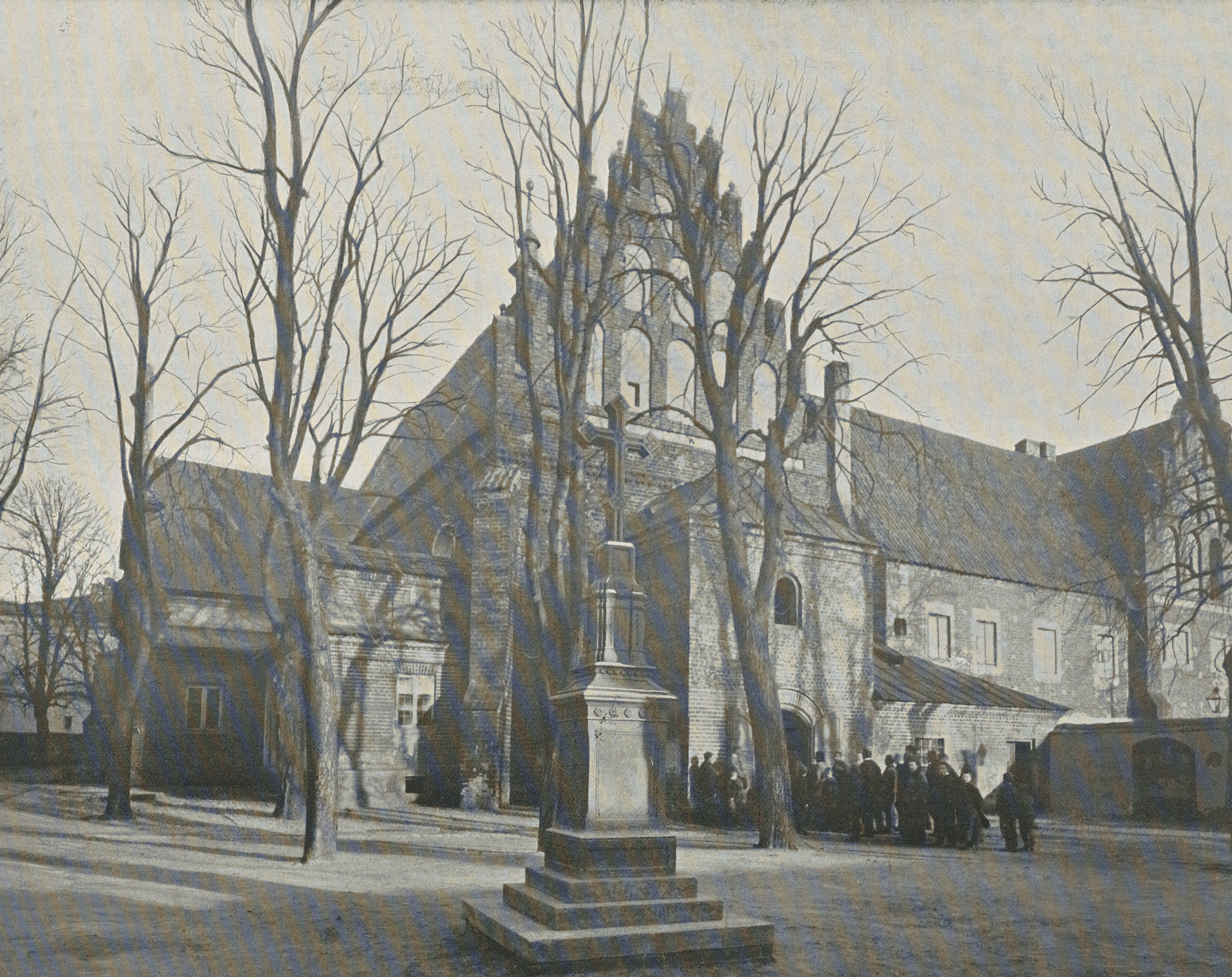
View of the church before 1899

In 1467, after exchanges between King Casimir Jagiellon and Pope Paul II, Bishop Jan Rzeszowski was directed to establish a monastery. Monks came to Radom in 1468.

The position of the monastery originally sat next to Lublin Gate, a component of the Radom city walls. The king provided land, and other support came from a general collection.

In 1602, the chancel was reconstructed.

In January 1698, King Augustus II the Strong stayed at the monastery after his coronation.

After the 1815 Congress of Vienna, Radom fell to the Russian Empire. In 1863, the monastery was turned into a prison. In 1864, a tsarist ukase ordered the closure of all monasteries in Poland. This action was due to perceptions that the Polish clergy had participated in the January Uprising, with the ukase itself even accusing the clergy of promoting bloodshed. The Bernardine monks from Radom were deported to Paradyż.

By 1911, the Radom monastery was being used as barracks. Monks returned to the Radom monastery in the 1930s.

In 1942, during German occupation, two Radom monks were sent by a German court to Auschwitz concentration camp.

== Architecture ==
The complex features the gothic church of St. Catherine of Alexandria and the neighboring monastery. The buttressed church has a single nave with two adjacent chapels. The chapel of St. Anne features a late-Renaissance gable. The chapel of St. Agnes features neo-gothic gables. The church and outbuildings form a small quadrangle.

== See also ==
- Bernardine Monastery Complex, Leżajsk
