= List of Historic Monuments (Poland) =

Logo for a Historic Monument ("pomnik historii") in Poland

Historic Monument (Polish: pomnik historii, pronounced [ˈpɔm.ɲik xisˈtɔ.rji]) is one of several categories of objects of cultural heritage in Poland.

To be recognized as a Polish historic monument, an object must be declared such by the President of Poland. The term "historic monument" was introduced into Polish law in 1990, and the first Historic Monuments were declared by President Lech Wałęsa in 1994.

== List ==
The National Heritage Board of Poland maintains the official list.

Location	Object	Image	Date of entry
Białystok	St. Roch's Church		17 January 2019
Biskupin	Biskupin archaeological reserve		16 September 1994
Bochnia	Bochnia Salt Mine		6 October 2000
Bóbrka	The Ignacy Łukasiewicz Museum of the Oil and Gas Industry in Bóbrka		16 January 2019
Brzeg	Brzeg Castle		16 January 2019
Chełmno	Chełmno Old Town		20 April 2005
Ciechocinek	A complex of graduation towers and spa parks		8 December 2017
Czerwińsk nad Wisłą	Canons Regular Abbey		19 April 2021
Częstochowa	Jasna Góra – Pauline monastery		16 September 1994
Dobrzyca	Dobrzyca Palace and Park		1 January 2019
Duszniki-Zdrój	Museum of Papermaking		12 October 2011
Frombork	Archcathedral complex		16 September 1994
Gdańsk	Gdańsk within its 17th-century fortifications		16 September 1994
Gdańsk	Westerplatte Battlefield		1 September 2003
Gdańsk	Cistercian-Cathedral complex in Oliwa		8 December 2017
Gdańsk	Wisłoujście Fortress		26 May 2018
Gdańsk	The Gdańsk Shipyard - the birthplace of Solidarity Movement		1 January 2019
Gdynia	The historical urban layout of the city centre		17 March 2015
Gliwice	Gliwice Radio Tower		29 March 2017
Gniezno	Cathedral Basilica of St. Adalbert and the Assumption of the Blessed Virgin Mary		16 September 1994
Gostyń – Głogówko	Basilica on the Holy Mountain		27 March 2008
Gościkowo-Paradyż	Former Cistercian Abbey		6 December 2017
Grudziądz	The complex of historical granaries		8 December 2017
Grunwald	Grunwald Battlefield (1410)		4 October 2010
Jabłeczna	Saint Onuphrius Monastery		2 February 2022
Jawor	Church of Peace		30 March 2017
Kalwaria Zebrzydowska	Mannerist architectural and park complex		17 November 2000
Kamieniec Ząbkowicki	Architectural and landscape complex with the abbey and palace		6 March 2024
Kamień Pomorski	The Co-Cathedral of St. John the Baptist		1 September 2005
Katowice	Workers' housing at Nikiszowiec		28 January 2011
Katowice	Silesia Province parliament building		22 October 2012
Kazimierz Dolny	Historic-preservation area		16 September 1994
Kielce	Palace of the Kraków Bishops in Kielce		8 December 2017
Klępsk	Church of the Visitation of the Holy Virgin Mary		1 April 2017
Kołbacz	Cistercian Abbey		21 July 2014
Koszuty	Koszuty Manor House		24 May 2018
Kozłówka	Palace and Park Complex		16 May 2007
Kórnik	Castle and park complex with All Saints' Church, where the owners are buried		11 July 2011
Kraków	Kraków historical city complex		8 September 1994
Kraków	Kościuszko Mound and its surroundings		8 December 2017
Kraków	Cistercian Abbey in Mogiła		13 September 2023
Kraków-Tyniec	Benedictine Abbey in Tyniec		30 March 2017
Kraków-Nowa Huta	The architectural and urban complex of the Nowa Huta district		30 January 2023
Krasiczyn	Krasiczyn Castle		24 May 2018
Krzeszów	Former Cistercian abbey complex		1 May 2004
Kwidzyn	Kwidzyn Castle and Cathedral		18 May 2018
Ląd	Former Cistercian abbey complex		1 July 2009
Lednogóra	Ostrów Lednicki Island in Lake Lednica		16 September 1994
Legnickie Pole	Legnickie Pole Benedictine Abbey		1 May 2004
Leżajsk	Bernardine monastery complex		20 April 2005
Lidzbark Warmiński	Castle of Warmian Bishops		19 May 2018
Lubiń	Lubiń Benedictine Abbey		16 December 2009
Lublin	Historic architectural and urban ensemble		16 May 2007
Lubostroń	Palace and park ensemble		21 November 2023
Łańcut	Castle and park complex		1 September 2005
Łęknica	Muskau Park		1 May 2004
Łowicz	Cathedral Basilica (former Collegiate Primate) of the Assumption of the Blessed Virgin Mary		13 November 2012
Łódź	The multicultural landscape of the industrial city of Łódź		7 March 2015
Łysa Góra (Święty Krzyż)	Benedictine Abbey at Święty Krzyż		29 March 2017
Malbork	Teutonic castle complex		16 September 1994
Małujowice	Saint James the Greater church		23 November 2022
Międzyrzecz	Piast Castle and manor and park ensemble		19 November 2024
Nysa	Parish church complex of St. James the Apostle and St. Agnes the Virgin and the Martyr		28 February 2011
Oblęgorek	Henryk Sienkiewicz Palace in Oblęgorek		19 May 2019
Olesno	Saint Anne church in Olesno		28 December 2018
Olsztyn	Castle of Warmian Cathedral Chapter		8 September 2023
Opatów	St. Martin's Collegiate Church		2 February 2023
Orawka	Saint John the Baptist church		8 April 2021
Ozimek	Ozimek Suspension Bridge		30 March 2017
Paczków	Old Town ensemble with its medieval fortification system		13 November 2012
Pelplin	Pelplin Abbey		15 May 2014
Płock	Tumskie Hill		25 May 2018
Poznań	Historic town ensemble of Ostrów Tumski, Zagórze, Chwaliszewo and the left bank Old Town with its medieval villages, suburban and urban architecture designed by Josef Stübben in the early 20th century, as well as Fort Winiary, now Park Cytadela		28 November 2008
Przemyśl	Przemyśl Old Town		28 December 2018
Pszczyna	Castle and park complex		18 April 2021
Puławy	Czartoryski Palace		31 May 2021
Pułtusk	Basilica of the Annunciation of the Holy Virgin Mary		30 December 2018
Racławice	Historic battlefield of the Battle of Racławice		1 May 2004
Radom	Bernardine monastery complex		15 March 2022
Radruż	Church complex		7 December 2017
Rogalin	Rogalin Palace and Park		18 May 2018
Rokitno	Sanctuary of Our Lady of Rokitno		27 November 2024
Rydzyna	Rydzyna Castle and Old Town		29 March 2017
Rytwiany	Former Camaldolese Golden Forest Hermitage monastery complex		28 December 2018
Sandomierz	Sandomierz Old Town		8 December 2017
Srebrna Góra	Fort Srebrna Góra, modern mountain stronghold of the 18th century		1 May 2004
Staniątki	Benedictine nunnery		13 May 2020
Stargard	Ensemble of the Church of the Blessed Virgin Mary, Queen of the World and the medieval city walls		4 October 2010
Stary Sącz	Old Town with the Poor Clare Nuns monastery		28 December 2018
Stoczek Klasztorny	Sanctuary and Basilica of the Visitation		19 December 2022
Strzegom	Saints Peter and Paul Basilica		22 October 2012
Strzelno	Former Norbertine Abbey complex		24 May 2018
Sudół	Krzemionki – flint mines from the Neolithic Age		16 October 1994
Sulejów	Cistercian abbey complex		22 October 2012
Sulejówek	Museum of Józef Piłsudski		13 August 2020
Supraśl	Monastery of the Annunciation and St. John the Theologian		2 February 2023
Szalowa	Parish Church of St. Michael Archangel		6 December 2017
Świdnica	Cathedral of St. Stanislaus and St. Wenceslaus		29 March 2017
Świdnica	Holy Trinity Church of Peace		30 March 2017
Święta Lipka	Święta Lipka Sanctuary		23 May 2018
Tarnowskie Góry	Historic Silver Mine and the Black Trout Adit		1 May 2004
Toruń	Old Town ensemble (Old Town, New Town and ruins of the Teutonic castle)		16 September 1994
Trzebiechów	Former sanatorium		31 July 2025
Trzebnica	Saint Hedwig's Basilica		22 July 2014
Tum	Collegiate Church of St. Mary and St. Alexius		12 April 2022
Tykocin	Historic town ensemble		19 April 2021
Ujazd	Krzyżtopór Castle		19 May 2018
Wałbrzych	Książ Castle		31 July 2025
Warsaw	Historic town ensemble with the Royal Route and Wilanów Palace		16 September 1994
Warsaw	William Lindley's water filter stations ensemble		18 January 2012
Wąchock	Cistercian Abbey		30 March 2017
Wieliczka	Salt mine		16 September 1994
Wiślica	Collegiate Basilica of the Birth of the Blessed Virgin Mary		28 December 2018
Włocławek	Cathedral Basilica of the Assumption of St. Mary		28 December 2018
Wrocław	Historic centre ensemble (Ostrów Tumski, Old Town, New Town and nearby islands)		16 September 1994
Wrocław	Centennial Hall and the architectural ensemble including the Four Domes Pavilion, the Pergola, and the Iglica		20 April 2005
Wygoda	Janów Podlaski stud farm		6 December 2017
Zabrze	Historic coal mine complex – Królowa Luiza Adit, Guido Mine, Main Key Hereditary Adit		14 July 2020
Zamość	Historic town ensemble within its 19th-century fortifications		16 September 1994
Ziębice	Parish church of Saint George		19 February 2024
Żagań	Post-Augustinian Monastery complex		11 March 2011
Żórawina	Holy Trinity church		21 March 2024
Żyrardów	19th-century factory settlement		17 January 2012
Entries covering multiple locations
–	Bohoniki and Kruszyniany – mosques and mizars		20 November 2012
–	Augustów Canal		16 May 2007
–	Elbląg Canal		28 January 2011
–	Cultural and natural landscape of Góra Świętej Anny		1 May 2004
–	Palaces and landscape parks of Jelenia Góra valley		20 September 2011
–	Przemyśl Fortress		29 January 2019
