= Jakob Ernst von Liechtenstein-Kastelkorn =

Saxon bishop

His Grace Jakob Ernst von Liechtenstein-Kastelkorn
- Prince-Archbishop of Salzburg
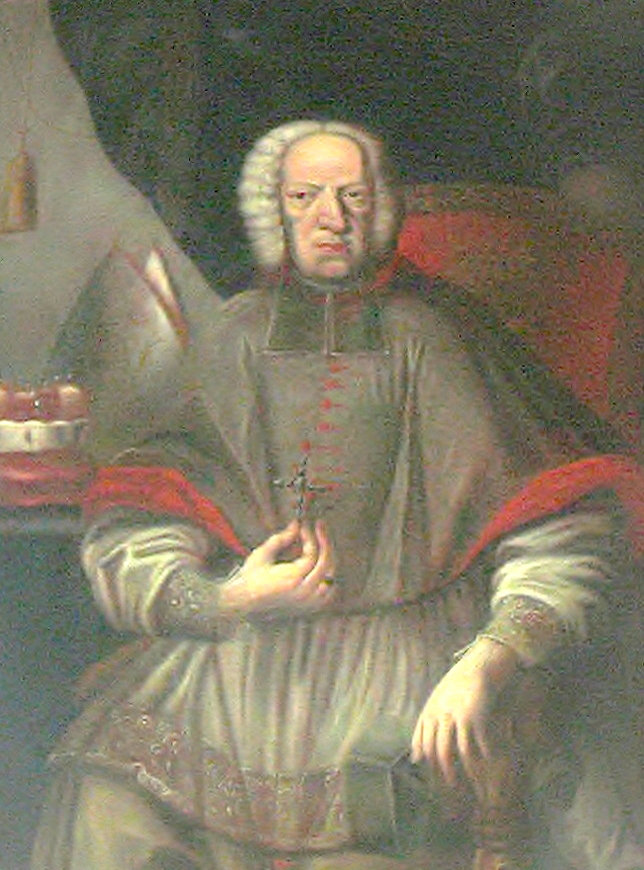
- Church: Roman Catholic Church
- Archdiocese: Salzburg
- See: Cathedral of Saints Rupert and Vergilius
- Installed: 13 September 1745
- Term ended: 12 June 1747
- Predecessor: Leopold Anton von Firmian
- Successor: Andreas Jakob von Dietrichstein
- Other posts: Bishop of Olomouc; Bishop of Seckau

Personal details
- Born: 14 February 1690 Hertwigswalde, Saxony, Holy Roman Empire
- Died: 12 June 1747 (aged 57) Salzburg, Holy Roman Empire
- Education: Collegium Germanicum (ThD)

Jakob Ernst von Liechtenstein-Kastelkorn (14 February 1690 in Hertwigswalde – 12 June 1747 in Salzburg) was Bishop of Seckau, Bishop of Olomouc and Prince-Archbishop of Salzburg.

== Biography ==
Jakob Ernst von Liechtenstein-Kastelkorn came from the South Tyrol noble family Liechtenstein-Kastelkorn. His parents were Franz von Liechtenstein-Kastelkorn, Imperial Privy Councillor, and Katharina b. Freiin Pavlovská. He studied philosophy and law in Brno and Olomouc. After he had decided on a spiritual career, he received in 1709 a canon in Olomouc and studied from 1709 to 1712 at the Collegium Germanicum in Rome, where he acquired a theological doctorate. After being ordained a priest in Rome in 1713, he worked for several years in the episcopal chancery in Olomouc and was at the same time an archdeacon in Troppau. In 1717 he was, after the renunciation of his brother, canon in Salzburg, where he soon rose to consistory president.

=== Bishop of Seckau ===
On 17 January 1728, Pope Benedict XIII appointed Jakob Ernst von Liechtenstein-Kastelkorn as Bishop of the Salzburg Diocese of Graz-Seckau (Eigenbistum); he succeeded Leopold Anton von Firmian, who became archbishop of Salzburg. The episcopal ordination took place on 14 March 1728. At the same time he became Salzburg Vicar General for Styria and the Neustädter district.

=== Bishop of Olomouc ===
After the death of Wolfgang Hannibal von Schrattenbach, Bishop of Olomouc, the cathedral chapter chose Jakob Ernst von Liechtenstein-Kastelkorn as his successor on 11 October 1738. The papal confirmation of the election took place on 26 January 1739.

During his tenure, he donated to the college in Weißwasser. In order to procure work for the craftsmen, he arranged extensive work after the Prussian occupation of Olomouc in 1742 at the cathedral and at the prince-bishop's residence. On 12 May 1743, he crowned Maria Theresa in Prague's St. Vitus Cathedral as Queen of Bohemia. The pontifical garment he wore at this ceremony is now in the treasury of Saint Wenceslas Cathedral in Olomouc.

=== Archbishop of Salzburg ===
After the death of Salzburg's Prince-Bishop Leopold Anton von Firmian, the cathedral chapter there chose Jakob Ernst von Liechtenstein-Kastelkorn as his successor on 13 January 1745. Due to the high debts of the archbishopric, his short reign was overshadowed by disputes with the cathedral chapter. After his death he was buried in the crypt of the Salzburg Cathedral.

== Bibliography ==
- Erwin Gatz: Die Bischöfe des Heiligen Römischen Reiches. Bd. 3, S. 275–276, ISBN 3-428-06763-0
- Joachim Bahlcke u. a.: Handbuch der historischen Stätten Böhmen und Mähren. Stuttgart 1998, ISBN 3-520-32901-8
- Biographisches Lexikon zur Geschichte der böhmischen Länder. Bd. 2, S. 446–447, ISBN 3-486-52551-4
