= Genowefa Wiśniowska =

Polish politician (born 1949)

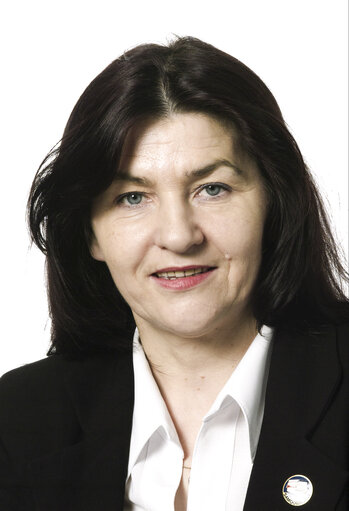

Deputy Marshal of Sejm
- In office 25 September 2005 – 9 July 2007

Personal details
- Born: 1949 (age 76–77)
- Party: Samoobrona

Genowefa Wiśniowska (born 4 March 1949 in Ożary, Poland) is a Polish politician.

She was elected to the Sejm on 25 September 2005, getting 10,670 votes in 24 Białystok district as a candidate from the Samoobrona Rzeczpospolitej Polskiej list. She was Vice Marshal of the Sejm from 2005 to 2007. She was also a member of Sejm 2001-2005, and served as a Member of the European Parliament in 2004.

== See also ==
- Members of Polish Sejm 2005-2007
