= Suszka =

Suszka may refer to the following places in Poland:

- Suszka, Lower Silesian Voivodeship (south-west Poland)
- Suszka, Lublin Voivodeship (east Poland)
- Suszka, Pomeranian Voivodeship (north Poland)
- Suszka, West Pomeranian Voivodeship (north-west Poland)

== See also ==
- Sushka
