= Gmina Kamieniec Ząbkowicki =

Gmina Kamieniec Ząbkowicki Kamieniec Ząbkowicki Commune
- Gmina
- Flag Coat of arms
- Interactive map of Gmina Kamieniec Ząbkowicki
- Coordinates (Kamieniec Ząbkowicki): 50°31′35″N 16°52′41″E
- Country: Poland
- Voivodeship: Lower Silesian
- County: Ząbkowice
- Seat: Kamieniec Ząbkowicki
- Sołectwos: Byczeń, Chałupki, Doboszowice, Kamieniec Ząbkowicki, Mrokocin, Ożary, Pomianów Górny, Sławęcin, Sosnowa, Śrem, Starczów, Suszka, Topola

Area
  - Total: 96.24 km^{2} (37.16 sq mi)

Population (2019-06-30)
  - Total: 8,137
  - Density: 84.55/km^{2} (219.0/sq mi)
- Website: https://kamienieczabkowicki.eu

Gmina Kamieniec Ząbkowicki is a rural gmina (administrative district) in Ząbkowice County, Lower Silesian Voivodeship, in south-western Poland. Its seat is the village of Kamieniec Ząbkowicki, which lies approximately 8 kilometres (5 mi) south-east of Ząbkowice Śląskie, and 68 kilometres (42 mi) south of the regional capital Wrocław.

The gmina covers an area of 96.24 square kilometres (37.2 sq mi), and as of 2019 its total population is 8,137.

== Neighbouring gminas ==
Gmina Kamieniec Ząbkowicki is bordered by the gminas of Bardo, Paczków, Ząbkowice Śląskie, Ziębice and Złoty Stok.

== Villages ==
The gmina contains the villages of Byczeń, Chałupki, Doboszowice, Kamieniec Ząbkowicki, Mrokocin, Ożary, Pomianów Górny, Sławęcin, Sosnowa, Śrem, Starczów, Suszka and Topola.

== Twin towns – sister cities ==
Gmina Kamieniec Ząbkowicki is twinned with:

- Bílá Voda, Czech Republic
- Ellzee, Germany
