= Gmina Złoty Stok =

Gmina Złoty Stok Złoty Stok Commune
- Gmina
- Coat of arms
- Interactive map of Gmina Złoty Stok
- Coordinates (Złoty Stok): 50°26′47″N 16°52′59″E
- Country: Poland
- Voivodeship: Lower Silesian
- County: Ząbkowice
- Seat: Złoty Stok
- Sołectwos: Błotnica, Chwalisław, Laski, Mąkolno, Płonica

Area
  - Total: 75.63 km^{2} (29.20 sq mi)

Population (2019-06-30)
  - Total: 4,476
  - Density: 59.18/km^{2} (153.3/sq mi)
  - Urban: 2,758
  - Rural: 1,718
- Website: http://www.zlotystok.pl

Gmina Złoty Stok is an urban-rural gmina (administrative district) in Ząbkowice County, Lower Silesian Voivodeship, in south-western Poland, on the Czech border. Its seat is the town of Złoty Stok, which lies approximately 16 kilometres (10 mi) south of Ząbkowice Śląskie, and 77 kilometres (48 mi) south of the regional capital Wrocław.

The gmina covers an area of 75.63 square kilometres (29.2 sq mi), and as of 2019 its total population is 4,476.

== Neighbouring gminas ==
Gmina Złoty Stok is bordered by the gminas of Bardo, Kamieniec Ząbkowicki, Kłodzko, Lądek-Zdrój and Paczków. It also borders the Czech Republic.

== Villages ==
Apart from the town of Złoty Stok, the gmina contains the villages of Błotnica, Chwalisław, Laski, Mąkolno and Płonica.

== Twin towns – sister cities ==
Gmina Złoty Stok is twinned with:

- Javorník, Czech Republic
- Szamocin, Poland
