= Sosnowa =

- Village
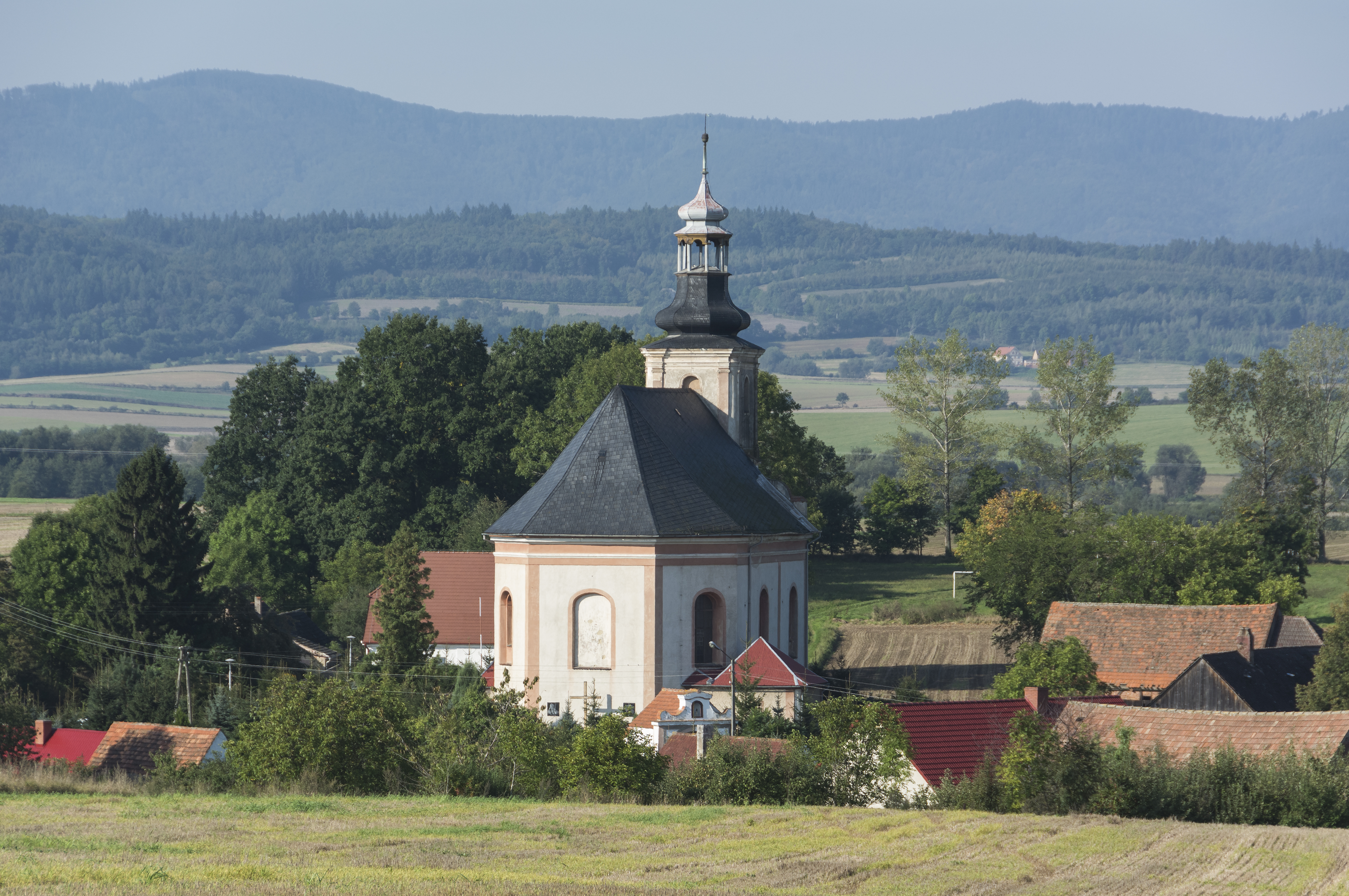

- Location within Poland
- Coordinates: 50°29′32″N 16°52′23″E
- Country: Poland
- Voivodeship: Lower Silesian
- County: Ząbkowice
- Gmina: Kamieniec Ząbkowicki
- First mentioned: 1260
- Time zone: UTC+1 (CET)
  - Summer (DST): UTC+2 (CEST)
- Vehicle registration: DZA

Sosnowa [sɔsˈnɔva] is a village in the administrative district of Gmina Kamieniec Ząbkowicki, within Ząbkowice County, Lower Silesian Voivodeship, in south-western Poland.

The name of the village is of Polish origin and comes from the word sosna which means "pine". It was first mentioned as Sosnova in 1260, when it was part of Piast-ruled Poland.
