= Śrem, Ząbkowice County =

Śrem
- Village
- Location within Poland
- Coordinates: 50°30′N 16°54′E
- Country: Poland
- Voivodeship: Lower Silesian
- County: Ząbkowice
- Gmina: Kamieniec Ząbkowicki

Śrem [ɕrɛm] is a village in the administrative district of Gmina Kamieniec Ząbkowicki, within Ząbkowice County, Lower Silesian Voivodeship, in south-western Poland.
