= Sławęcin, Lower Silesian Voivodeship =

Polish human settlement

Sławęcin
- Village
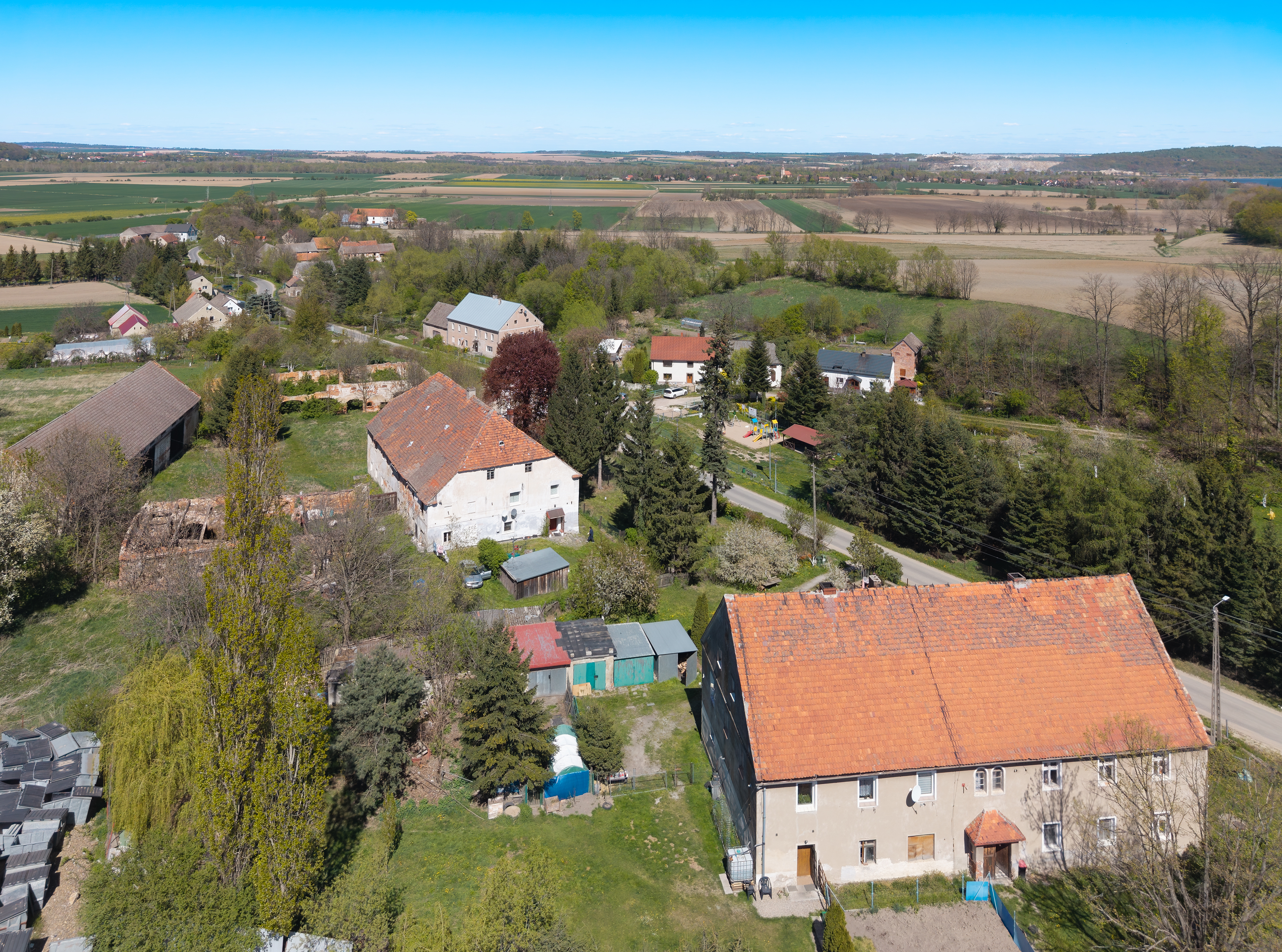

- Location within Poland
- Coordinates: 50°29′N 16°54′E
- Country: Poland
- Voivodeship: Lower Silesian
- County: Ząbkowice
- Gmina: Kamieniec Ząbkowicki
- Time zone: UTC+1 (CET)
  - Summer (DST): UTC+2 (CEST)
- Vehicle registration: DZA

Sławęcin [swaˈvɛnt͡ɕin] is a village in the administrative district of Gmina Kamieniec Ząbkowicki, within Ząbkowice County, Lower Silesian Voivodeship, in south-western Poland.

Throughout history the village formed part of Poland, Bohemia, Hungary, Austria, Prussia and Germany. Following Nazi Germany's defeat in World War II, the village became again part of Poland. In 1975–1998, Sławęcin formed part of the Wałbrzych Voivodeship of Poland.
