= Topola, Lower Silesian Voivodeship =

Topola
- Village
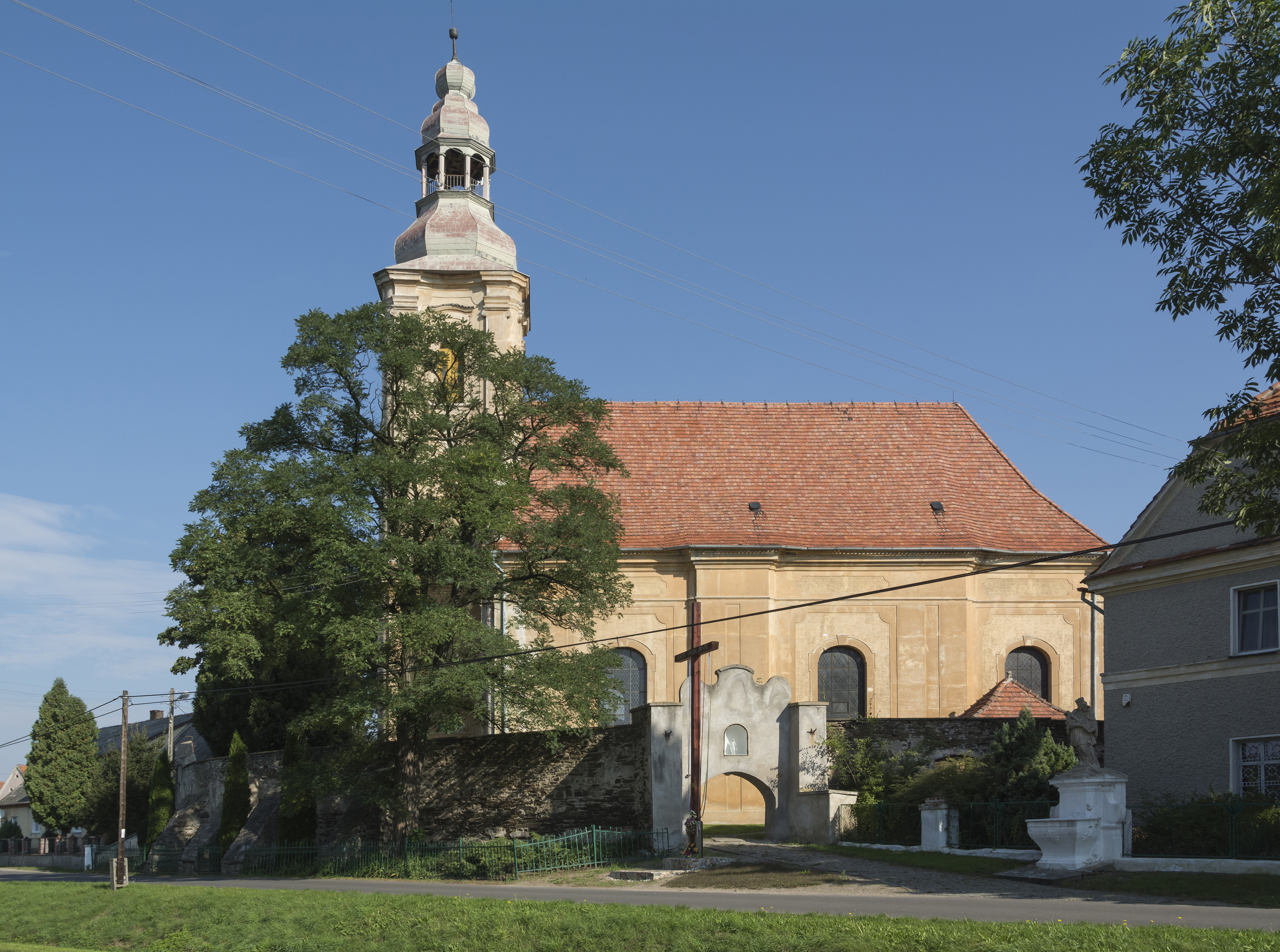
- Church of Saint Bartholomew

- Location within Poland
- Coordinates: 50°30′0″N 16°55′25″E
- Country: Poland
- Voivodeship: Lower Silesian
- County: Ząbkowice
- Gmina: Kamieniec Ząbkowicki

Topola [tɔˈpɔla] is a village in the administrative district of Gmina Kamieniec Ząbkowicki, within Ząbkowice County, Lower Silesian Voivodeship, in south-western Poland.
