= Chałupki, Lower Silesian Voivodeship =

Chałupki
- Village
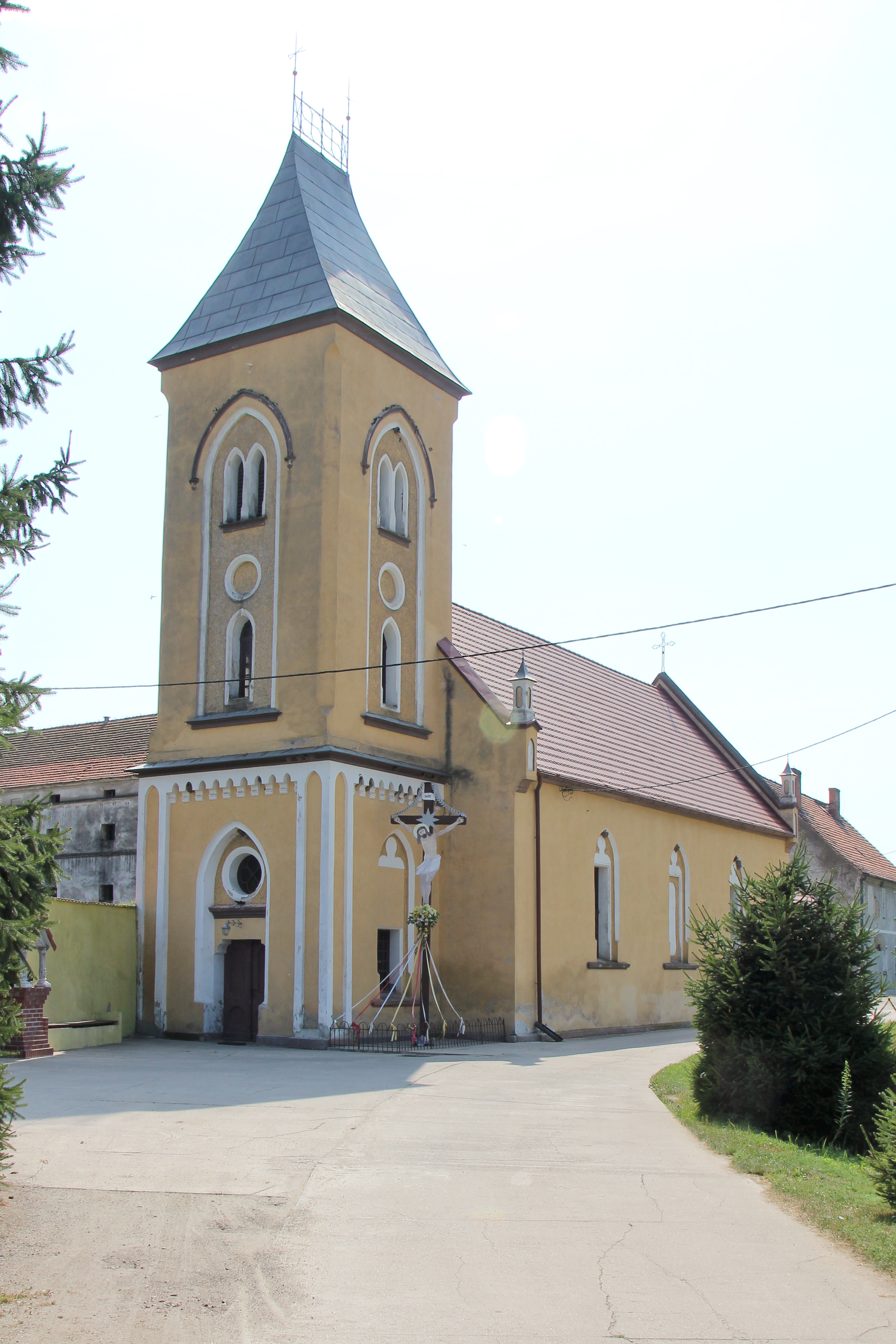
- Church of Saint John of Nepomuk

- Location within Poland
- Coordinates: 50°29′19″N 16°59′42″E
- Country: Poland
- Voivodeship: Lower Silesian
- County: Ząbkowice
- Gmina: Kamieniec Ząbkowicki

Chałupki [xaˈwupki] is a village in the administrative district of Gmina Kamieniec Ząbkowicki, within Ząbkowice County, Lower Silesian Voivodeship, in south-western Poland.
