= Byczeń =

- Village
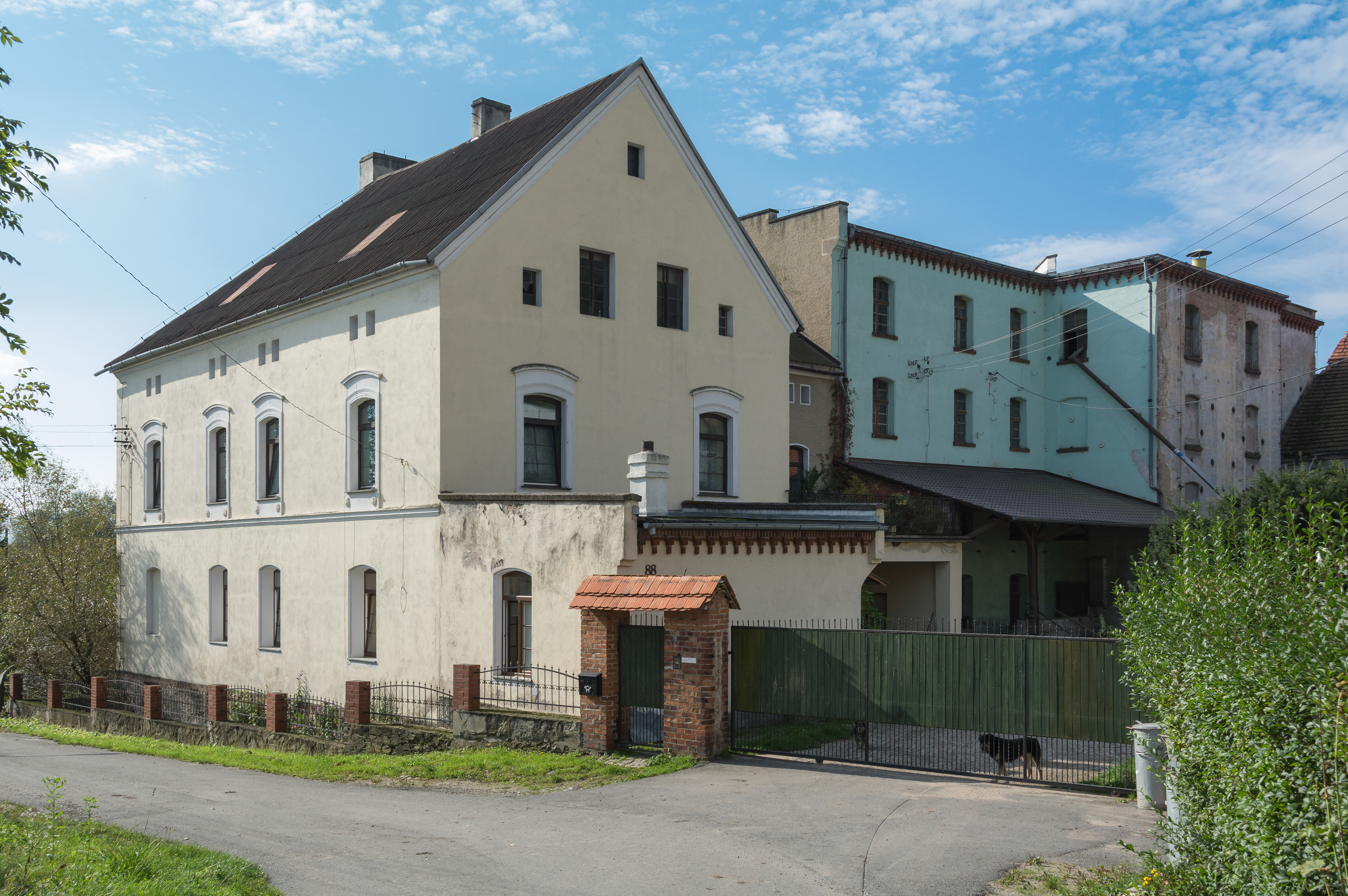

- Location within Poland
- Coordinates: 50°31′07″N 16°53′52″E
- Country: Poland
- Voivodeship: Lower Silesian
- County: Ząbkowice
- Gmina: Kamieniec Ząbkowicki

Byczeń [ˈbɨt͡ʂɛɲ] is a village in the administrative district of Gmina Kamieniec Ząbkowicki, within Ząbkowice County, Lower Silesian Voivodeship, in south-western Poland.
