= Złoty Stok =

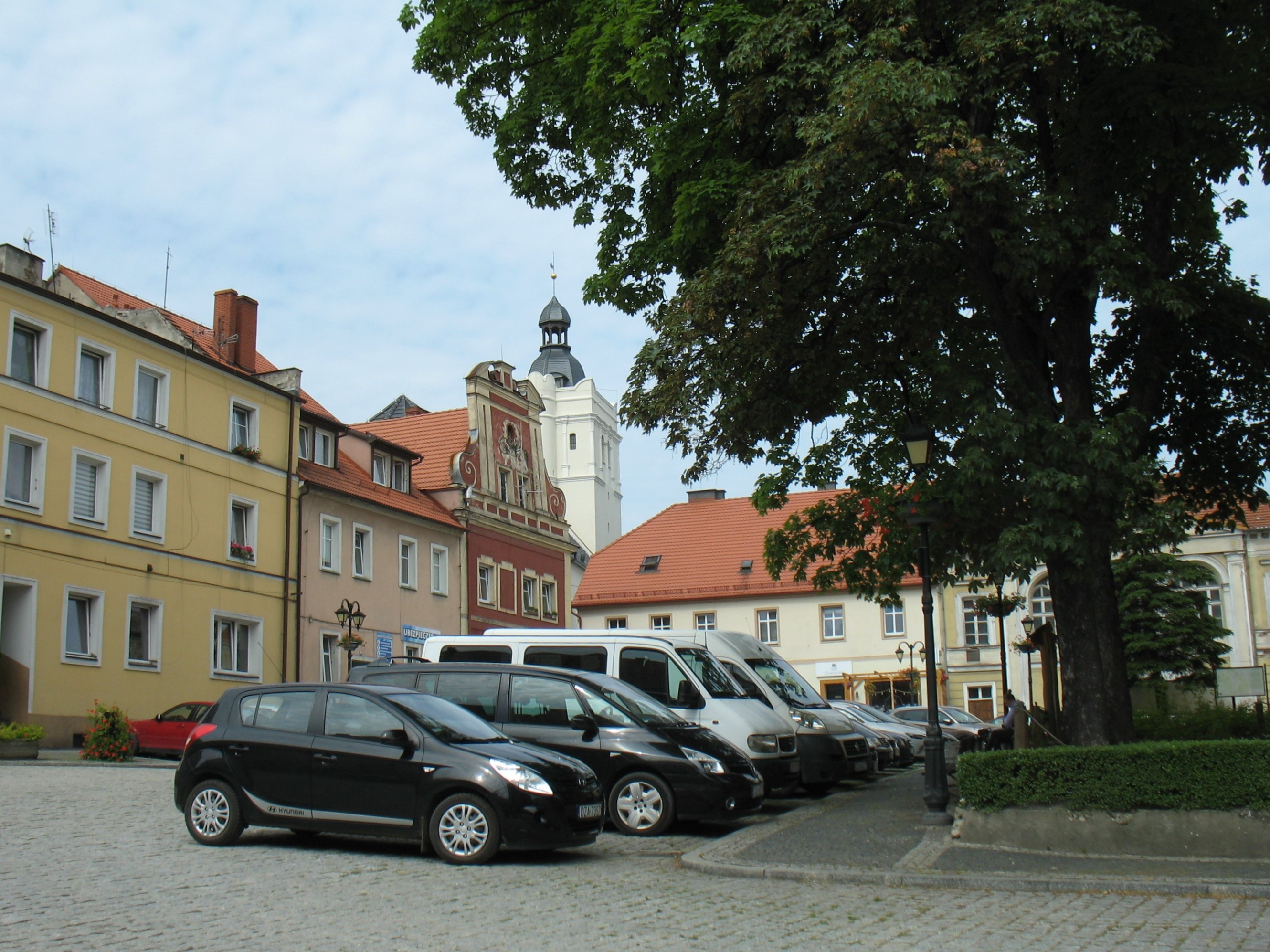
- Market square (2023)

- Coat of arms

- Location within Poland
- Coordinates: 50°26′47″N 16°52′59″E
- Country: Poland
- Voivodeship: Lower Silesian
- County: Ząbkowice
- Gmina: Złoty Stok
- Town rights: before 1334

Government
  - Mayor: Grażyna Orczyk

Area
  - Total: 7.73 km^{2} (2.98 sq mi)

Population (2019-06-30)
  - Total: 2,758
  - Density: 357/km^{2} (924/sq mi)
- Time zone: UTC+1 (CET)
  - Summer (DST): UTC+2 (CEST)
- Postal code: 57-250
- Area code: +48 74
- Vehicle registration: DZA
- Website: http://www.zlotystok.pl

Złoty Stok [ˈzwɔtɨ ˈstɔk] (Czech: Rychleby, German: Reichenstein, "Richstone") is a town in Ząbkowice County, Lower Silesian Voivodeship, in south-western Poland. It is the seat of the administrative district (gmina) called Gmina Złoty Stok. It is situated on the border with the Czech Republic, adjoining the Czech village of Bílá Voda.

== History ==
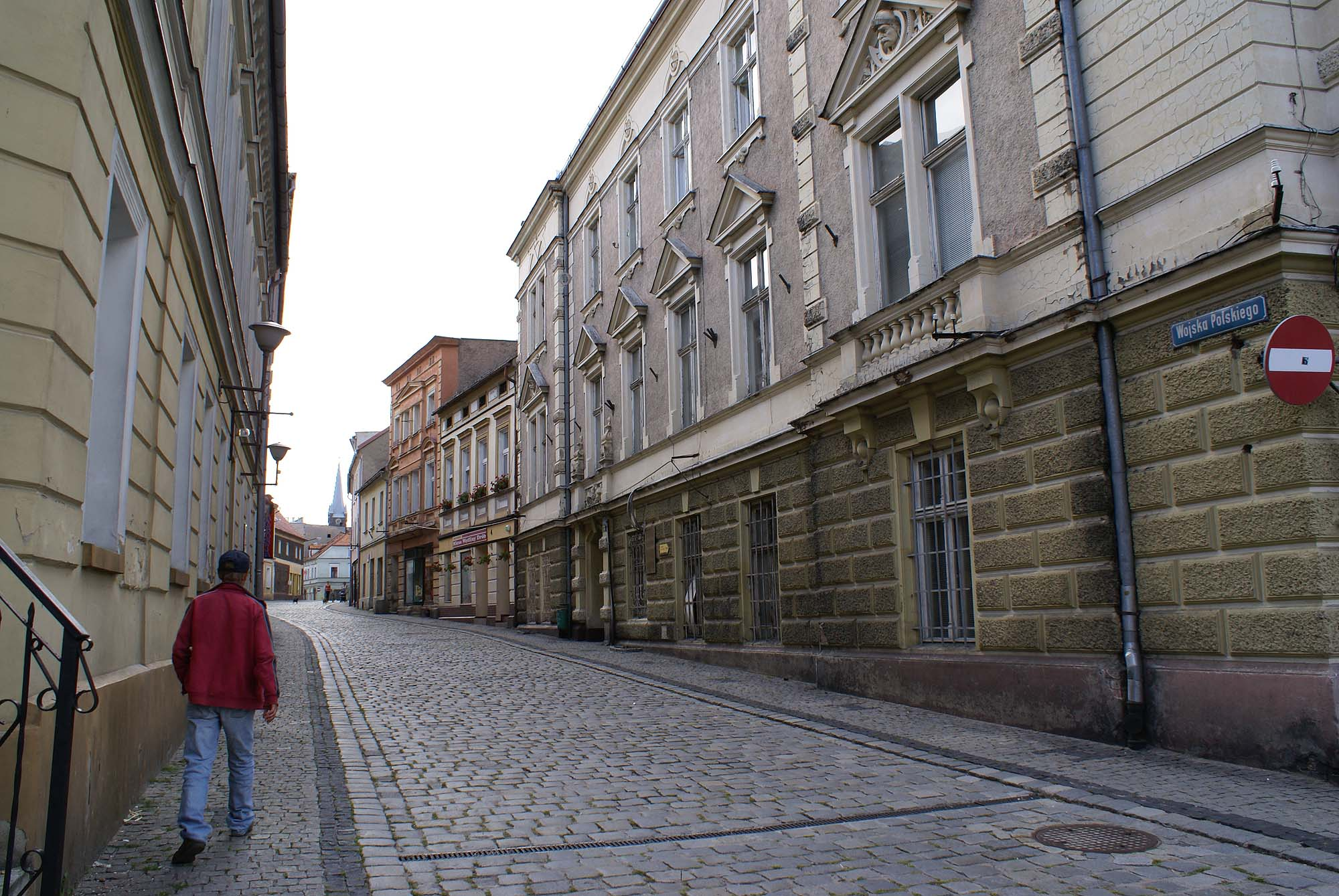
One of the streets of the historic city center, filled with old townhouses

The name Złoty Stok means "golden hillside" in Polish and is a reference to the fact that a gold deposit was mined here in the Middle Ages. Its Czech name is applied to the neighbouring mountain range, the Rychleby Mountains (Czech: Rychlebské hory). The corresponding Polish name is Góry Złote (Golden Mountains). This range is part of the eastern Sudetes.

The area became part of the emerging Polish state in the 10th century under first historic ruler Mieszko I of Poland of the Piast dynasty, and after the fragmentation of Poland it was located in the duchies of Silesia, Świdnica-Jawor, Ziębice and Świdnica-Jawor again, still ruled by the Piasts, until 1368. During this period, the settlement was first mentioned and town rights were granted. Afterwards it came under the suzerainty of the Bohemian Kingdom. In 1428 it was destroyed by the Hussites. From 1469 to 1490 it was under Hungarian suzerainty and afterwards it was under Bohemian suzerainty again.

The first evidence of mining in Złoty Stok dates from the first millennium AD. In 1491, Duke Henry I of the Czech Podiebrad family granted the town the coat of arms, banner and status of a "free mining town". Many German and Czech miners settled there. At the beginning of the 16th century the town, called Reichenstein (literally "Richstone") by the Germans and Rychleby by the Czechs, began to flourish thanks to the mining and working of gold. The search for this precious ore continued until the closing of the mine in the late 1960s, even though it had not fully rendered all its wealth.

In 1742 the town was annexed by Prussia. Reichenstein, was, for many prisoners of war, a stopping place on 'The Long March' during the final months of the Second World War in Europe. About 30,000 Allied PoWs were force-marched westward across Poland, Czechoslovakia and Germany in appalling winter conditions, lasting about four months from January to April 1945. After World War II it became part of the Polish Recovered Territories.

== Sights ==
There are a number of historical monuments in the town, including a museum of gold mining and metallurgy (Muzeum Górnictwa i Hutnictwa Złota w Złotym Stoku).

== Twin towns – sister cities ==
See twin towns of Gmina Złoty Stok.

== Gallery ==
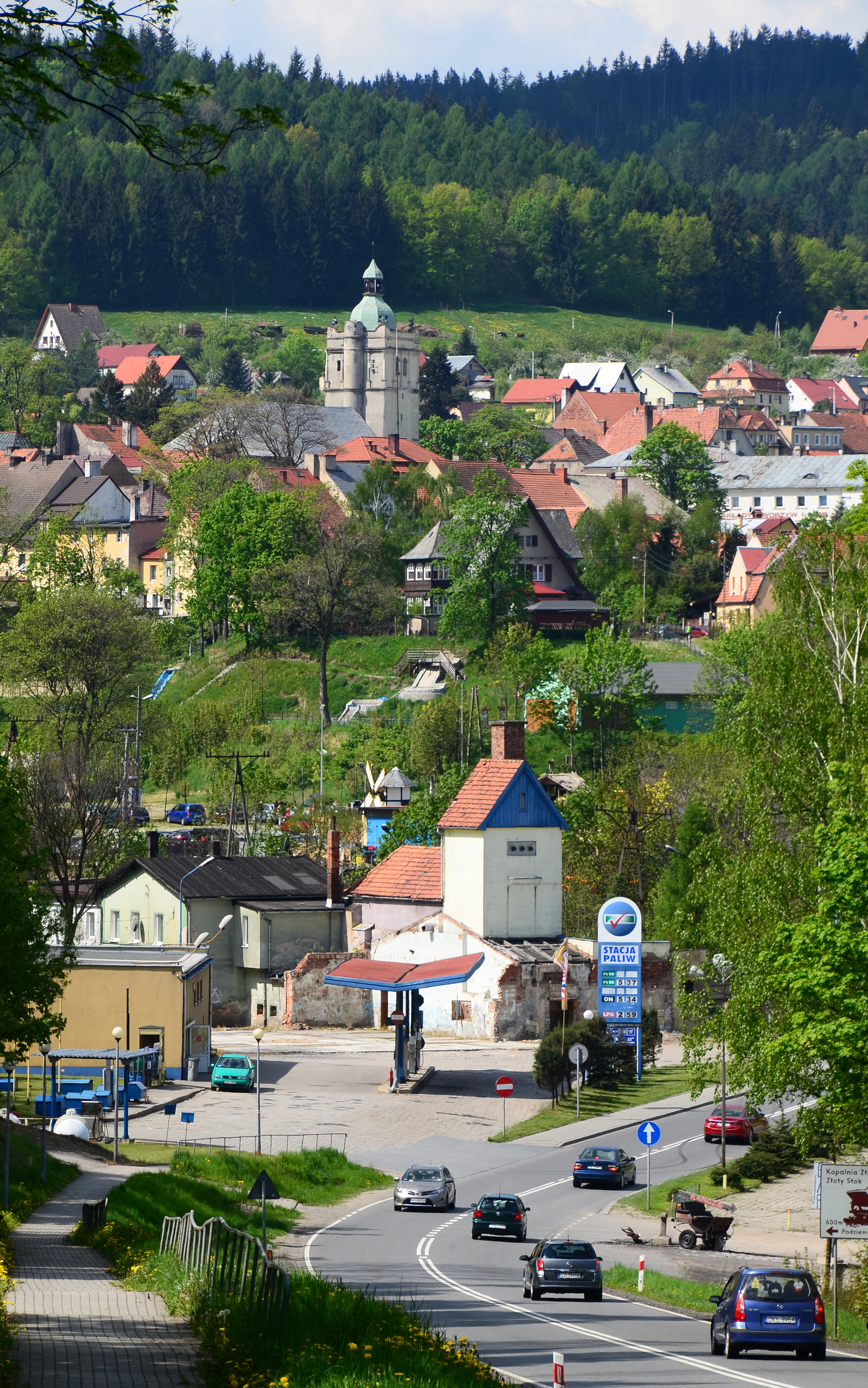
Town centre

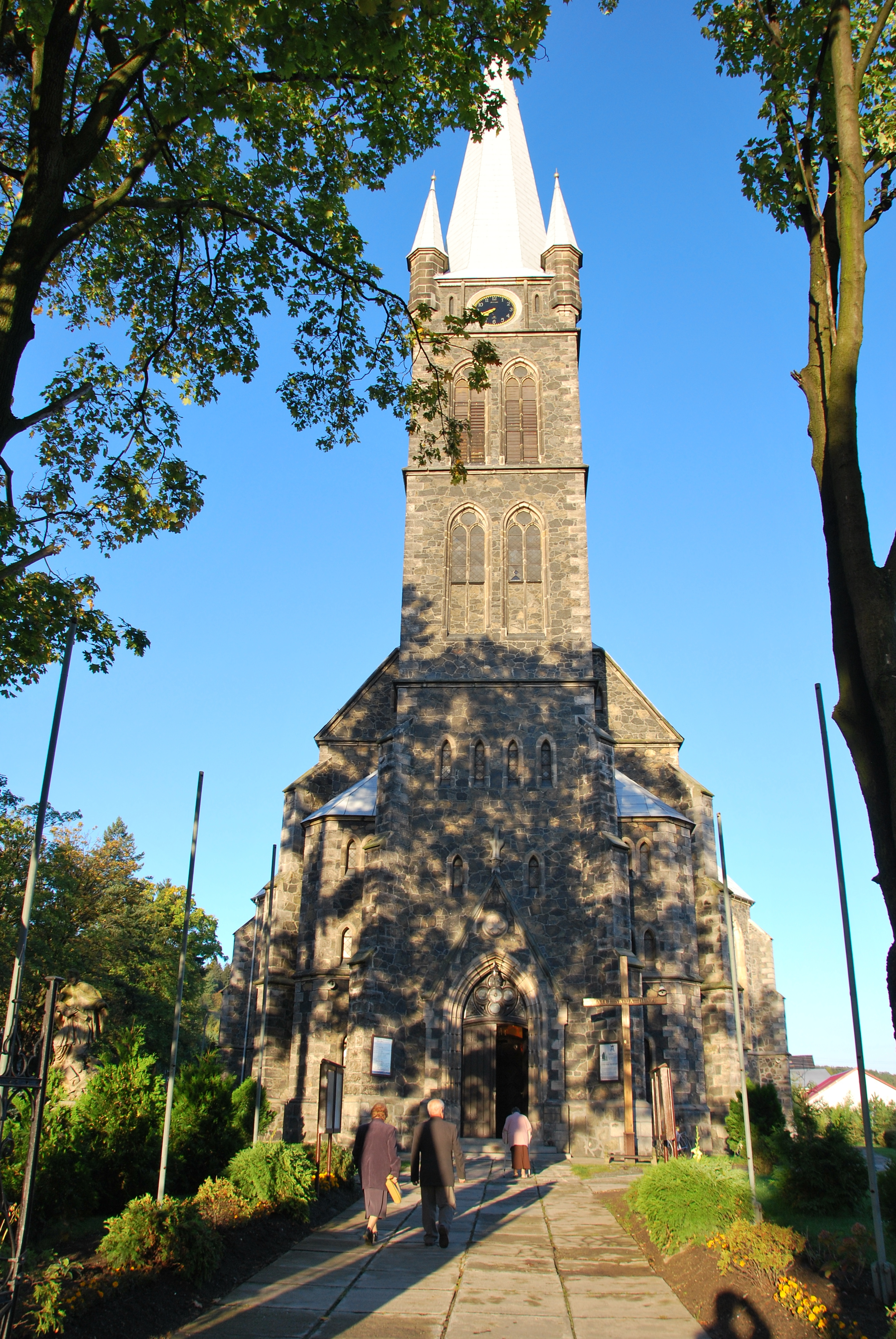
The Immaculate Conception Church

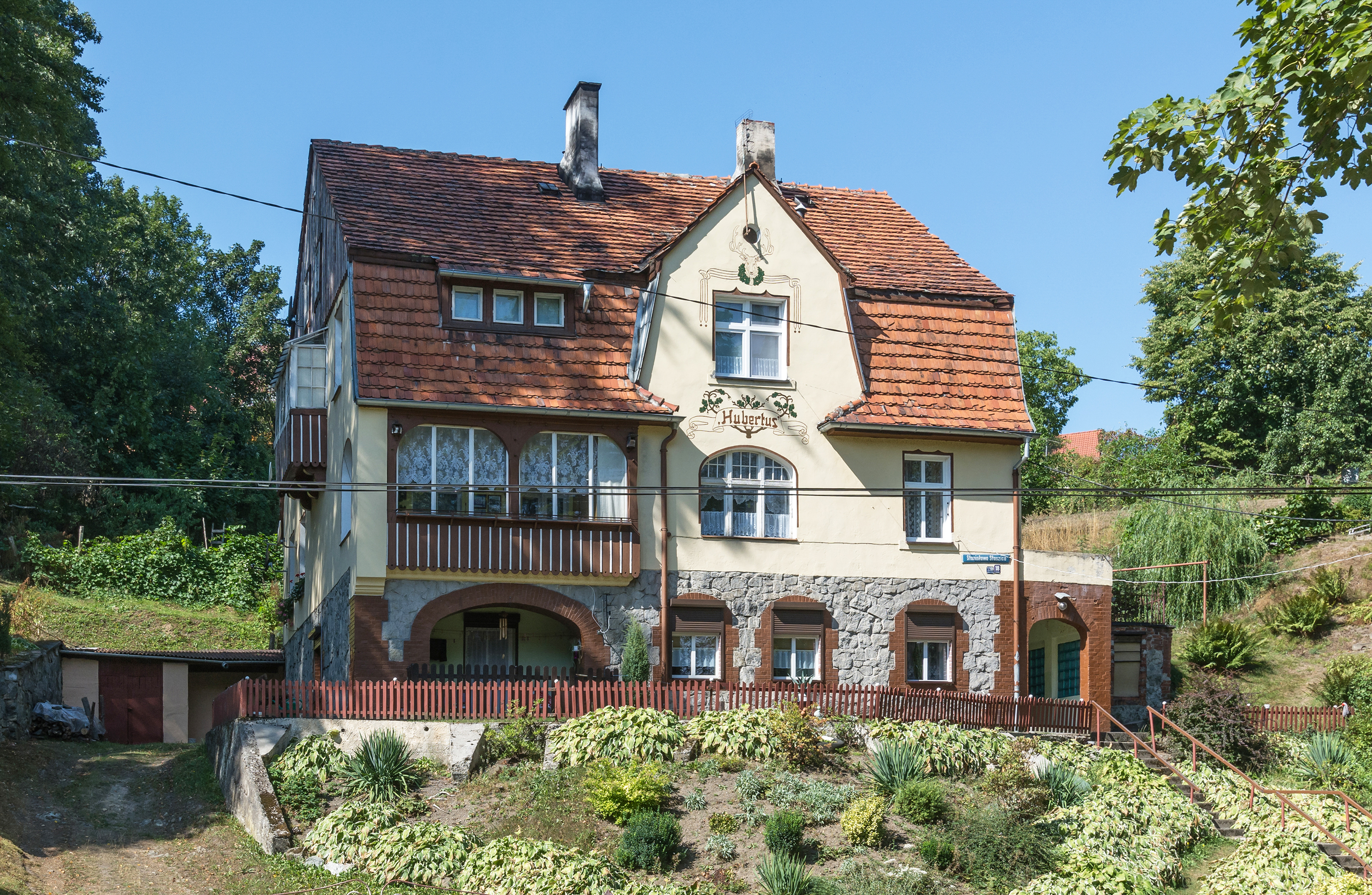
Hubertus Villa

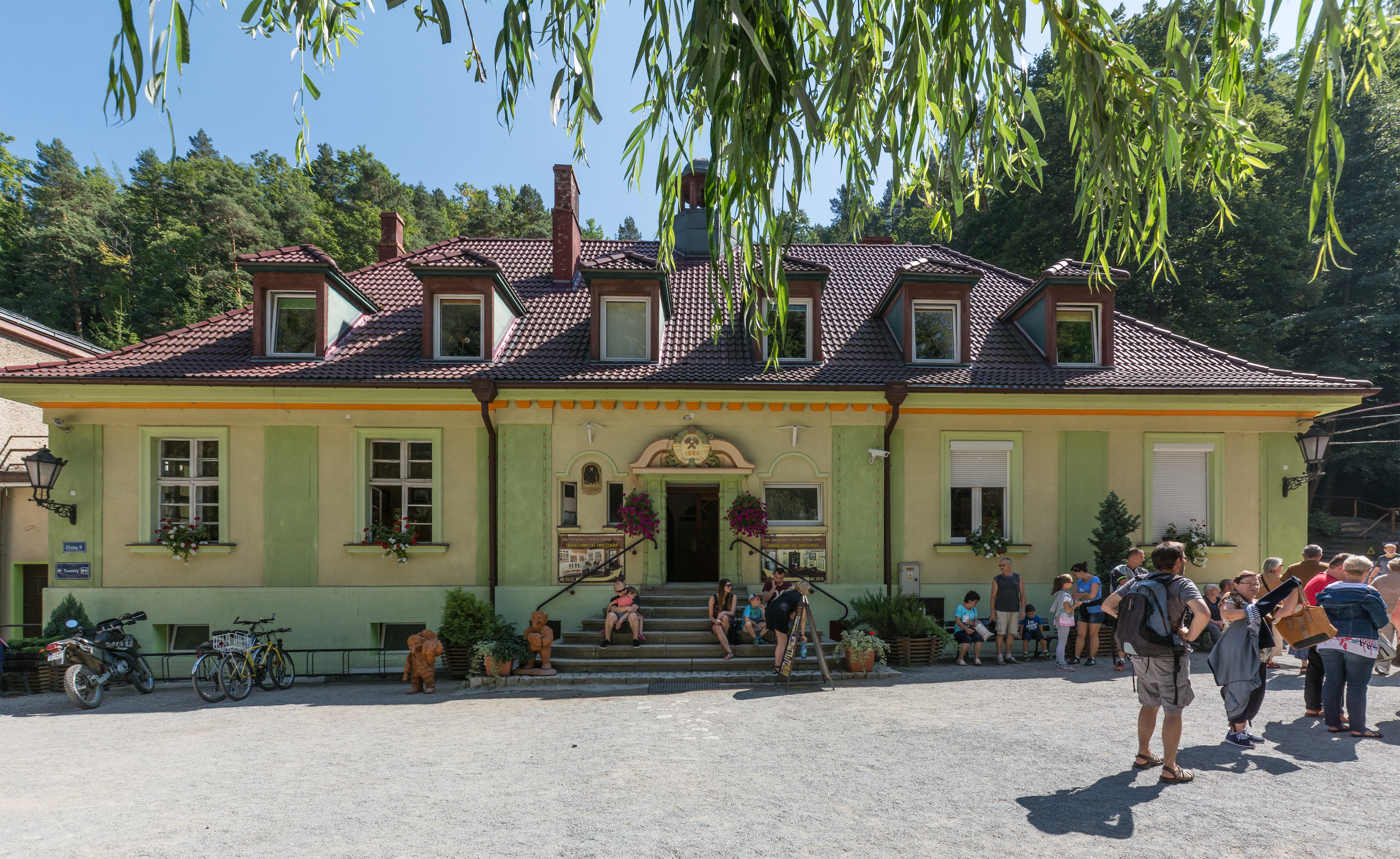
Gold mining museum

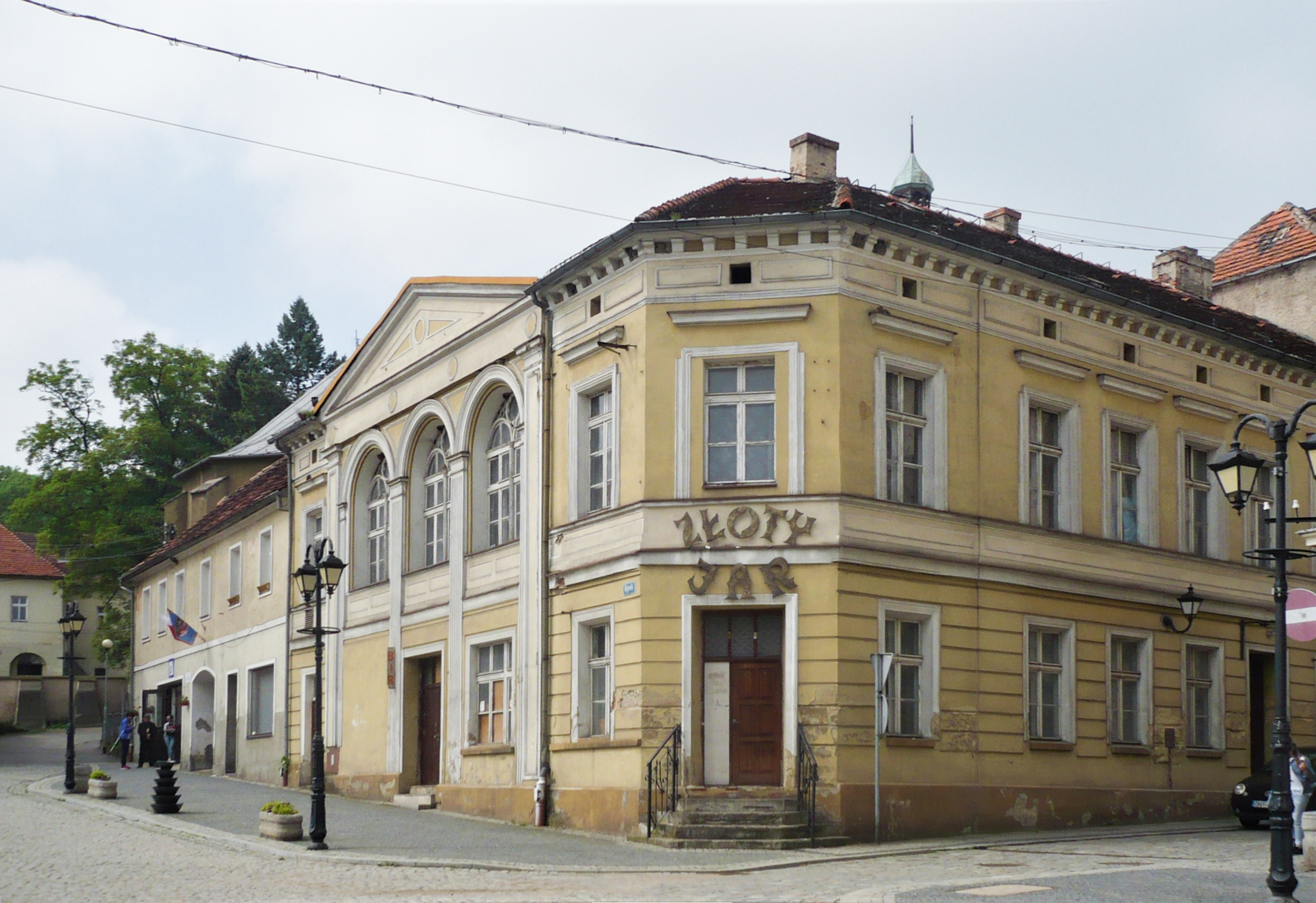
Market square

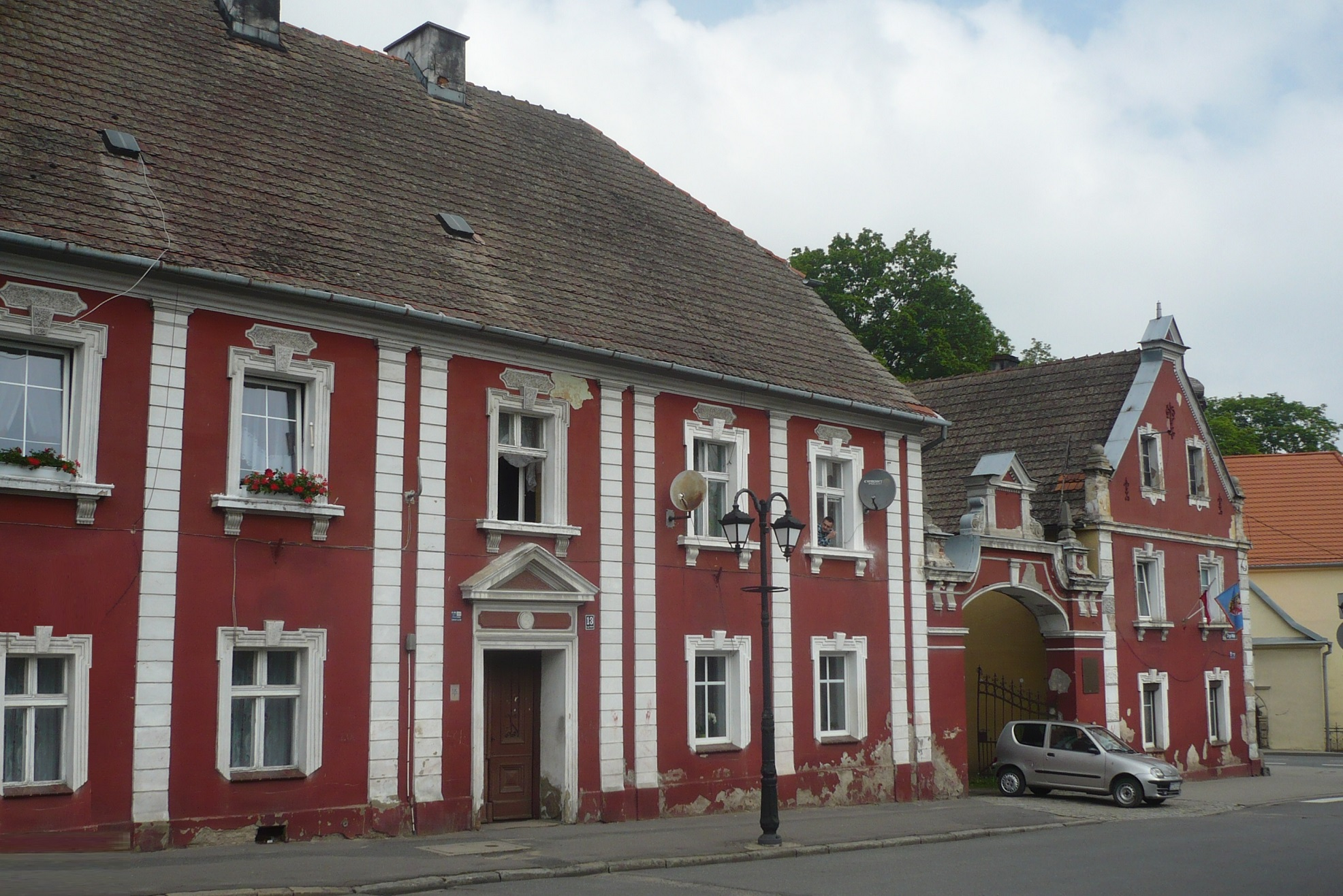
Historic townhouses
