= Mąkolno, Lower Silesian Voivodeship =

Mąkolno
- Village
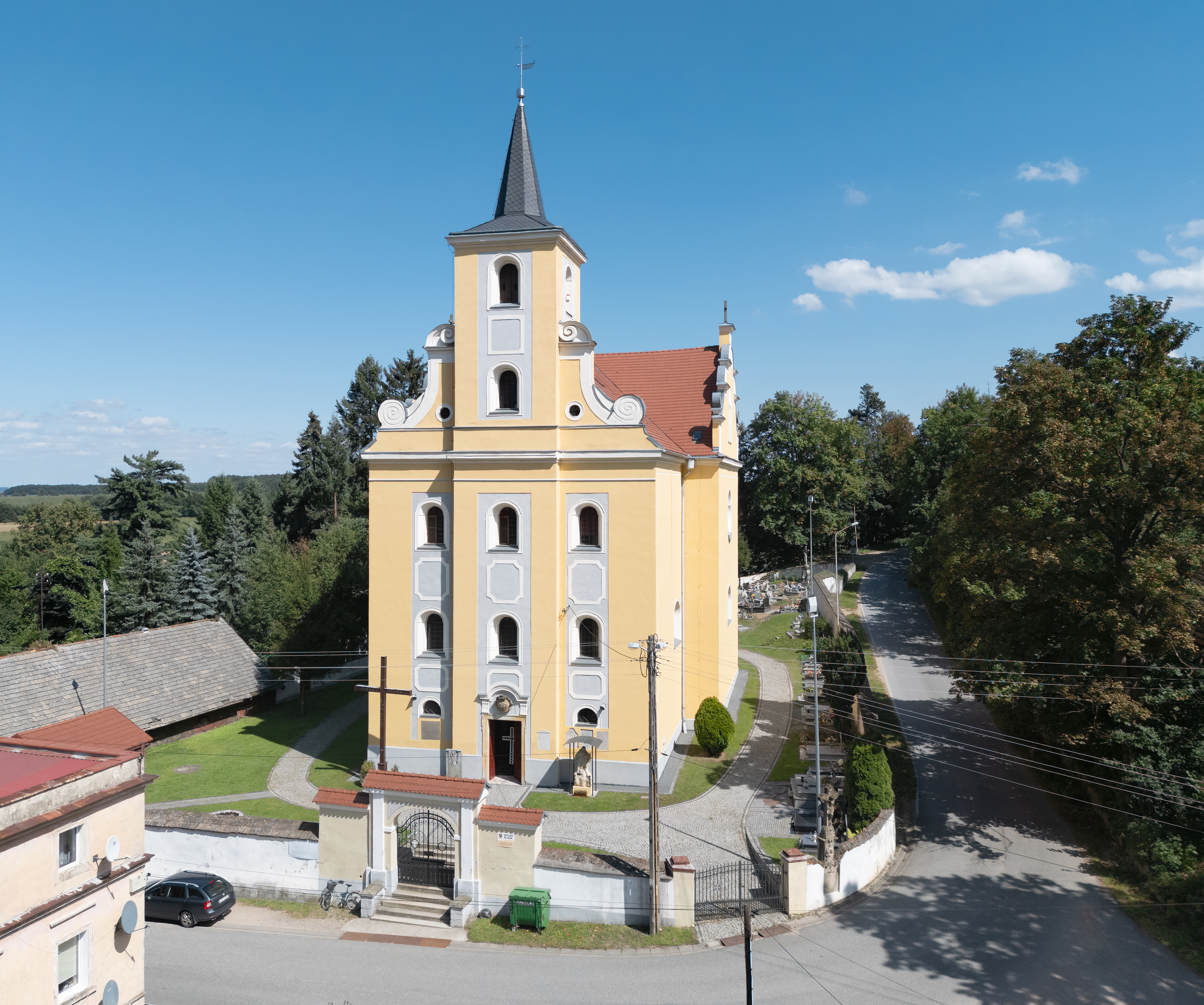

- Location within Poland
- Coordinates: 50°27′50″N 16°50′48″E
- Country: Poland
- Voivodeship: Lower Silesian
- County: Ząbkowice
- Gmina: Złoty Stok
- Population: 590

Mąkolno [mɔŋˈkɔlnɔ] is a village in the administrative district of Gmina Złoty Stok, within Ząbkowice County, Lower Silesian Voivodeship, in south-western Poland, close to the Czech border.
