= Błotnica, Ząbkowice County =

Błotnica
- Village
- Location within Poland
- Coordinates: 50°28′29″N 16°56′00″E
- Country: Poland
- Voivodeship: Lower Silesian
- County: Ząbkowice
- Gmina: Złoty Stok

Błotnica [bwɔtˈnit͡sa] is a village in the administrative district of Gmina Złoty Stok, within Ząbkowice County, Lower Silesian Voivodeship, in south-western Poland, close to the Czech border.
