= Starczów =

- Village
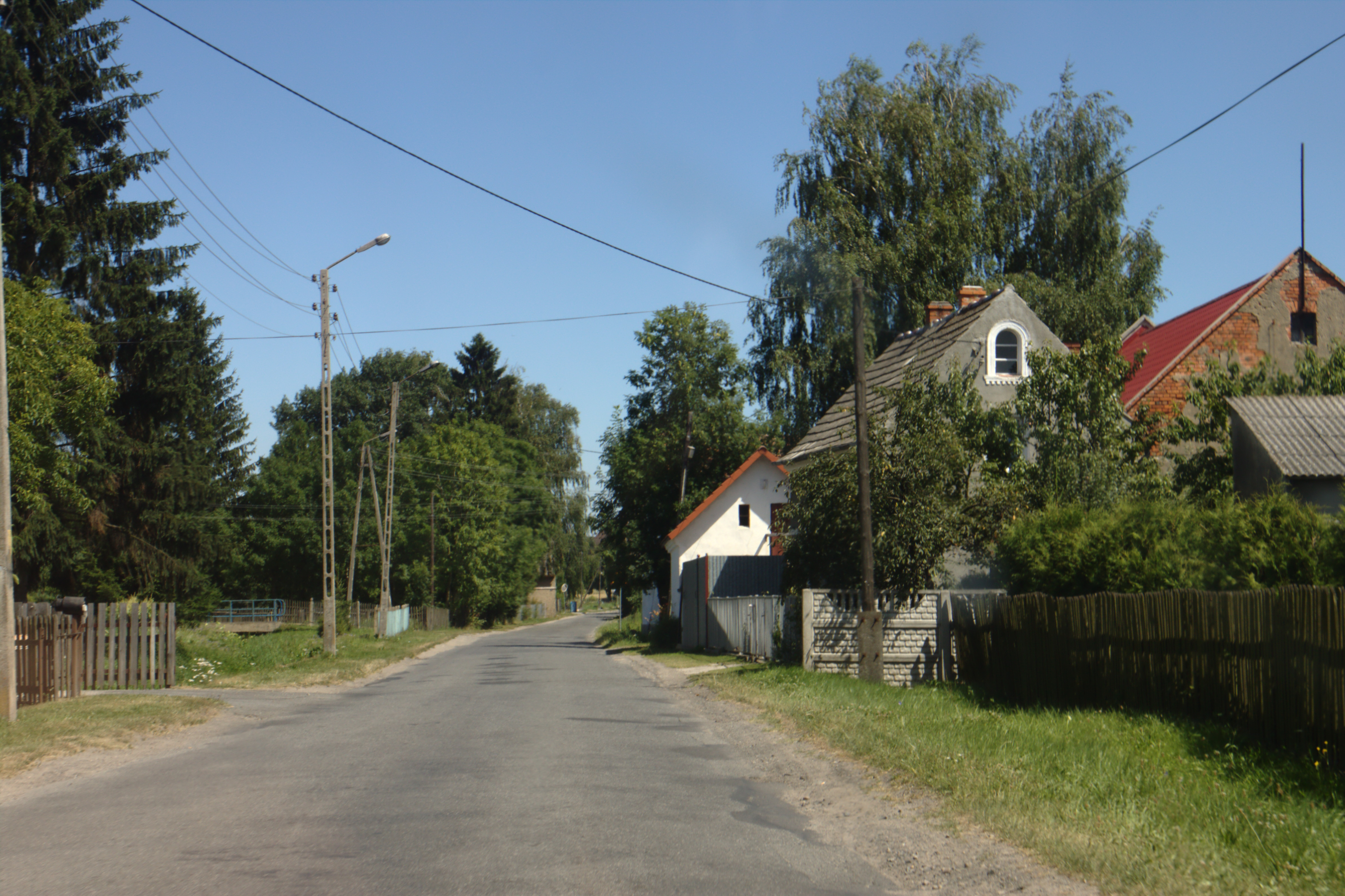
- Starczów, domy

- Location within Poland
- Coordinates: 50°33′N 16°56′E
- Country: Poland
- Voivodeship: Lower Silesian
- County: Ząbkowice
- Gmina: Kamieniec Ząbkowicki

Starczów [ˈstart͡ʂuf] (German: Alt Altmannsdorf) is a village in the administrative district of Gmina Kamieniec Ząbkowicki, within Ząbkowice County, Lower Silesian Voivodeship, in south-western Poland.
