= Laski, Lower Silesian Voivodeship =

Laski
- Village
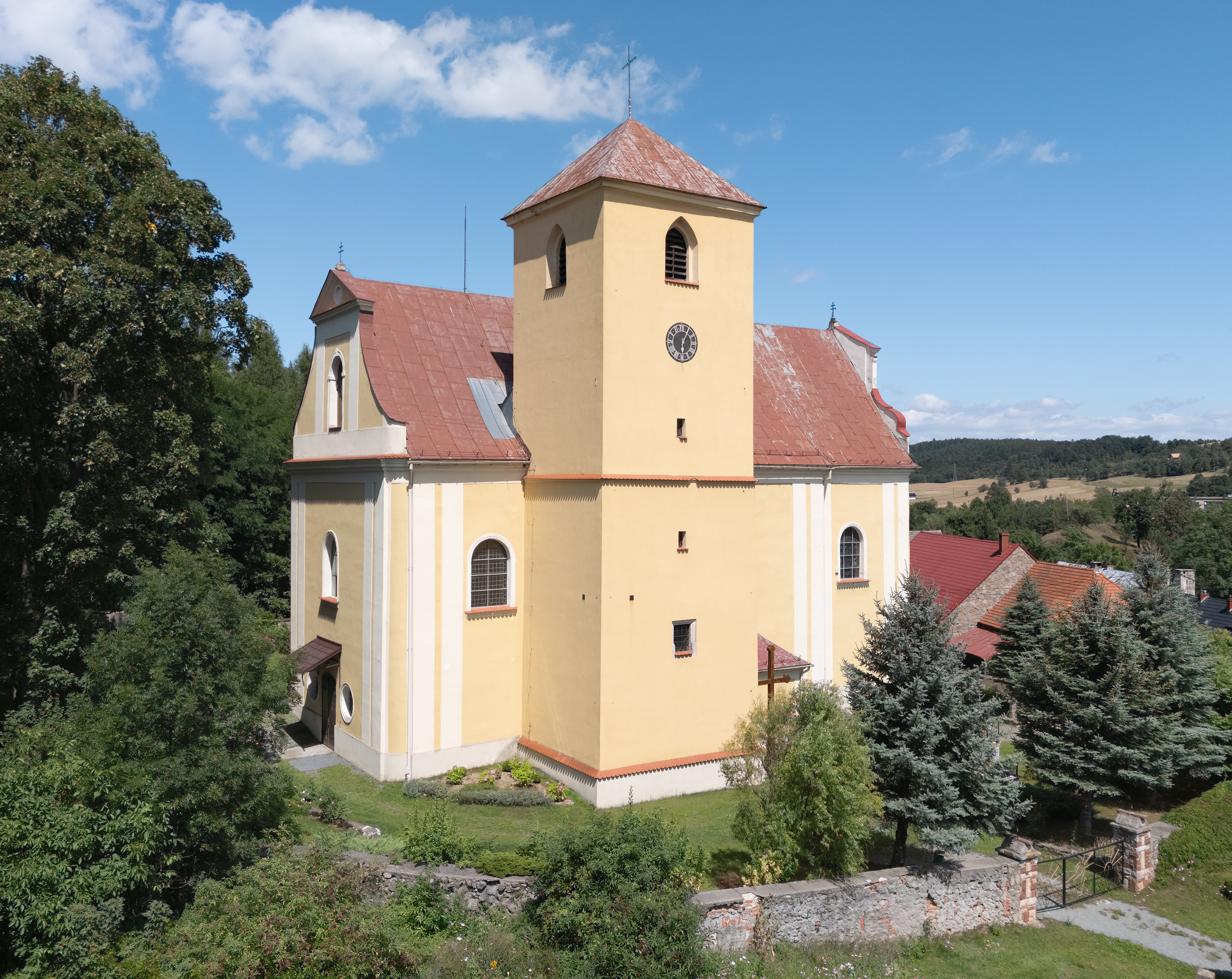
- Church of the Assumption

- Location within Poland
- Coordinates: 50°26′52″N 16°47′41″E
- Country: Poland
- Voivodeship: Lower Silesian
- County: Ząbkowice
- Gmina: Złoty Stok

Laski (Polish pronunciation: [ˈlaskʲi]) is a village in the administrative district of Gmina Złoty Stok, within Ząbkowice County, Lower Silesian Voivodeship, in south-western Poland, close to the Czech border.
