= Płonica, Lower Silesian Voivodeship =

Płonica
- Village
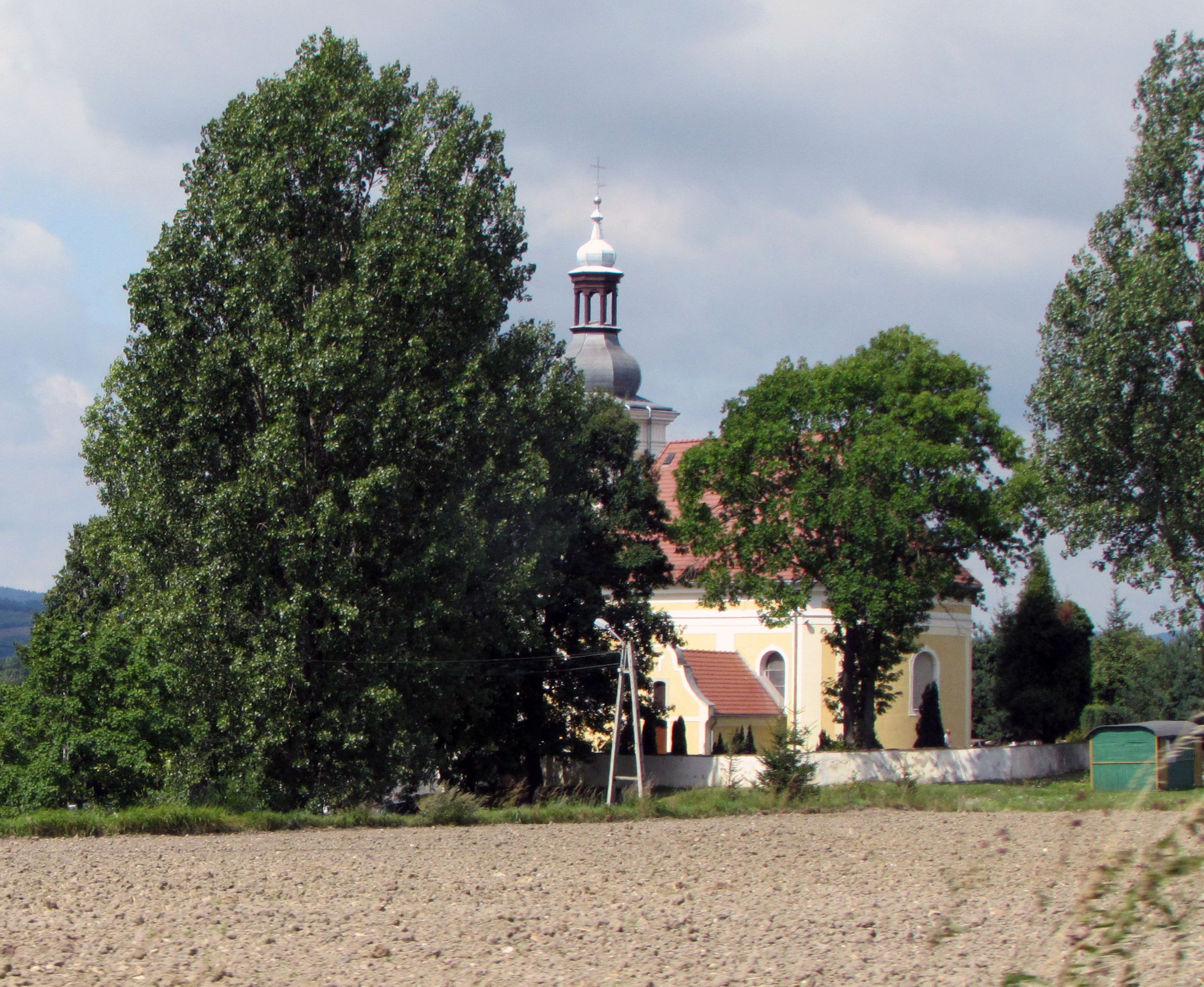
- Church of Saint Nicholas

- Location within Poland
- Coordinates: 50°29′N 16°51′E
- Country: Poland
- Voivodeship: Lower Silesian
- County: Ząbkowice
- Gmina: Złoty Stok
- Time zone: UTC+1 (CET)
  - Summer (DST): UTC+2 (CEST)
- Vehicle registration: DZA

Płonica [pwɔˈnit͡sa] is a village in the administrative district of Gmina Złoty Stok, within Ząbkowice County, Lower Silesian Voivodeship, in south-western Poland, close to the Czech border.
