= Pomianów Górny =

- Village
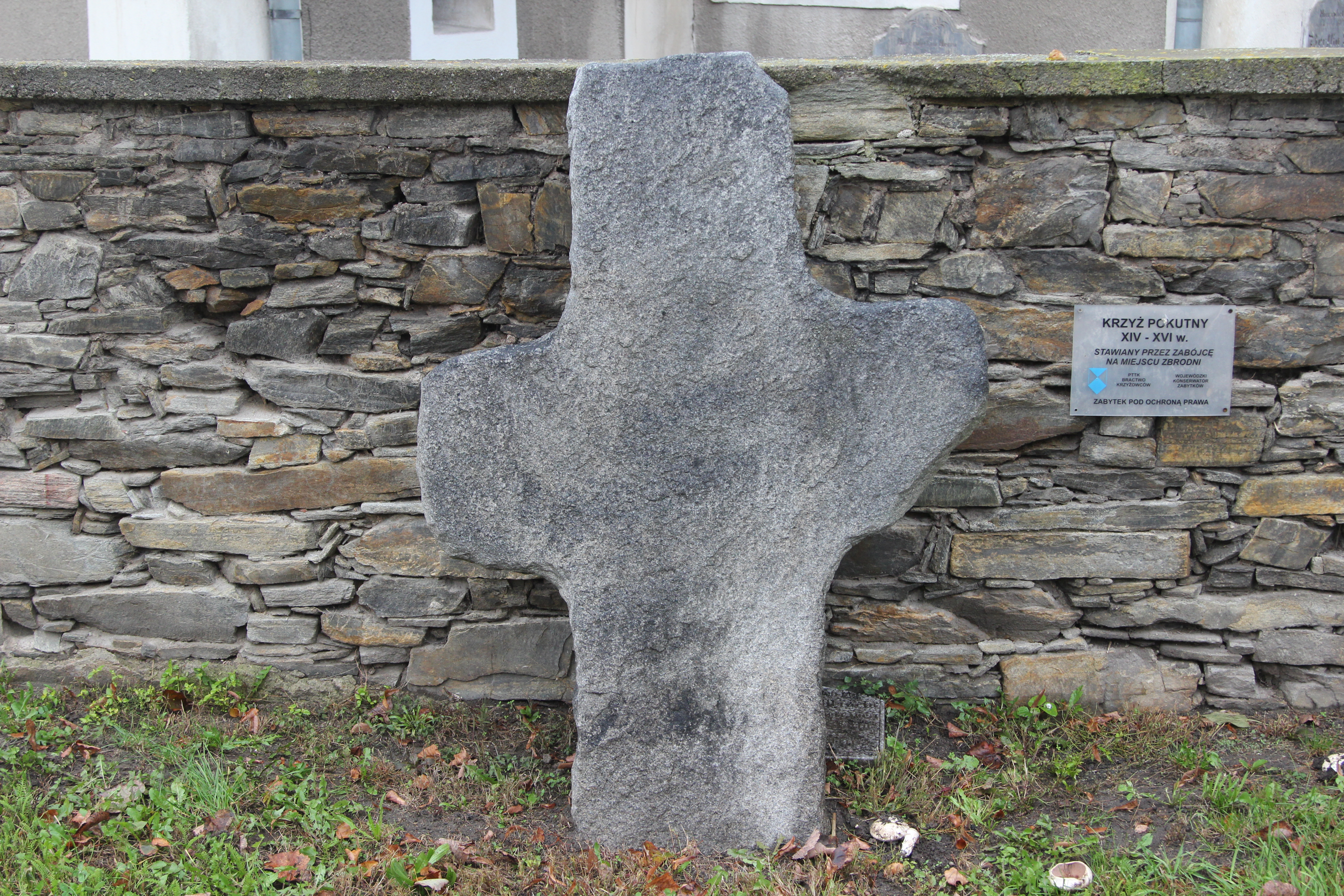
- Stone cross

- Location within Poland
- Coordinates: 50°30′04″N 16°57′16″E
- Country: Poland
- Voivodeship: Lower Silesian
- County: Ząbkowice
- Gmina: Kamieniec Ząbkowicki

Pomianów Górny [pɔˈmjanuf ˈɡurnɨ] is a village in the administrative district of Gmina Kamieniec Ząbkowicki, within Ząbkowice County, Lower Silesian Voivodeship, in south-western Poland.
