= Chwalisław =

- Village
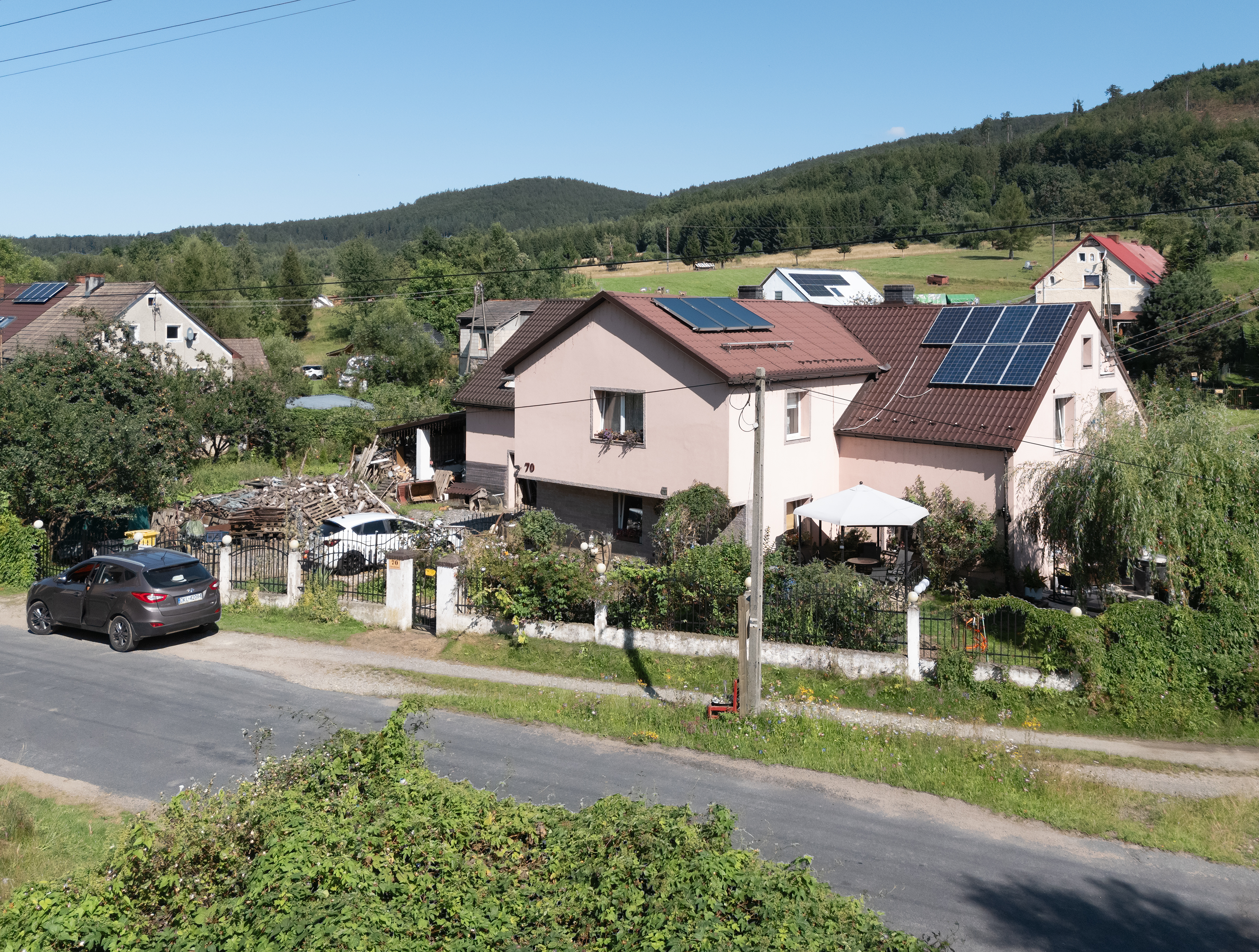

- Location within Poland
- Coordinates: 50°25′39″N 16°49′43″E
- Country: Poland
- Voivodeship: Lower Silesian
- County: Ząbkowice
- Gmina: Złoty Stok

Chwalisław [xfaˈliswaf] is a village in the administrative district of Gmina Złoty Stok, within Ząbkowice County, Lower Silesian Voivodeship, in south-western Poland, close to the Czech border.
