= Mrokocin =

- Village
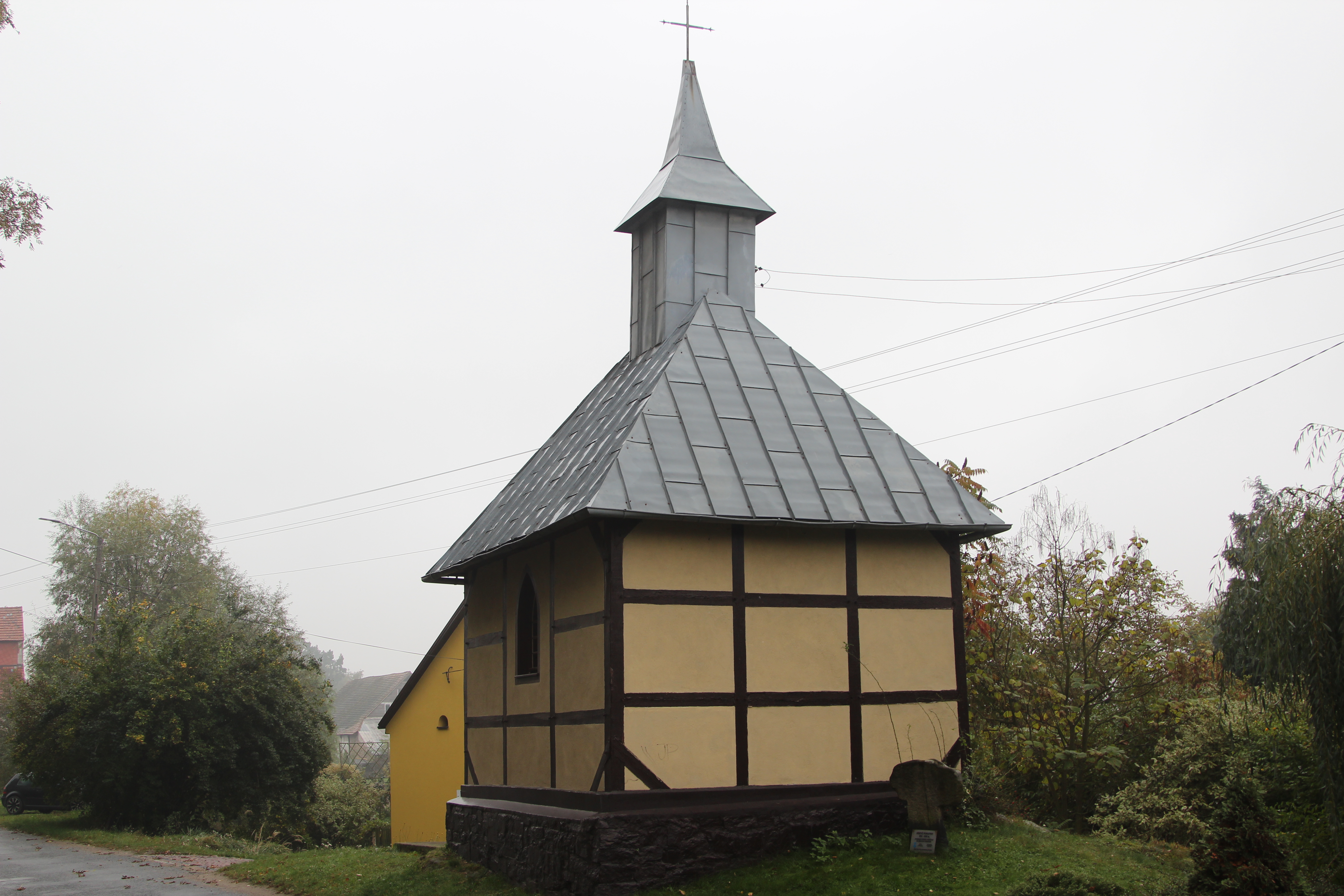

- Location within Poland
- Coordinates: 50°29′24″N 16°58′43″E
- Country: Poland
- Voivodeship: Lower Silesian
- County: Ząbkowice
- Gmina: Kamieniec Ząbkowicki

Mrokocin [mrɔˈkɔt͡ɕin] is a village in the administrative district of Gmina Kamieniec Ząbkowicki, within Ząbkowice County, Lower Silesian Voivodeship, in south-western Poland.
