= Ożary =

- Village
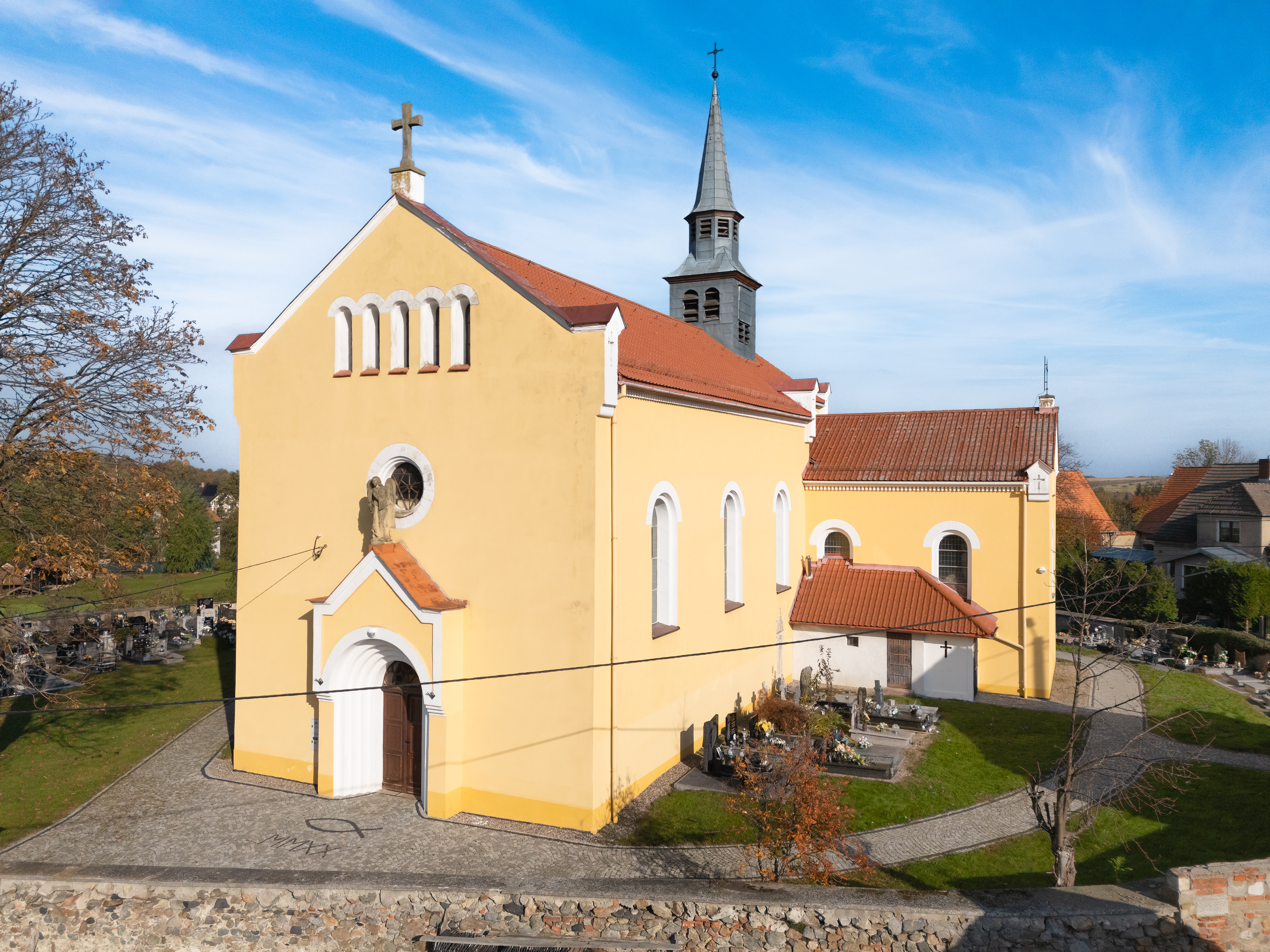
- Church of St. Catherine in Ożary

- Location within Poland
- Coordinates: 50°29′22″N 16°49′23″E
- Country: Poland
- Voivodeship: Lower Silesian
- County: Ząbkowice
- Gmina: Kamieniec Ząbkowicki
- Highest elevation: 296 m (971 ft)
- Lowest elevation: 267 m (876 ft)
- Population (approx.): 600

Ożary [ɔˈʐarɨ] is a village in the administrative district of Gmina Kamieniec Ząbkowicki, within Ząbkowice County, Lower Silesian Voivodeship, in south-western Poland.
