= Suszka, Lower Silesian Voivodeship =

Suszka
- Village
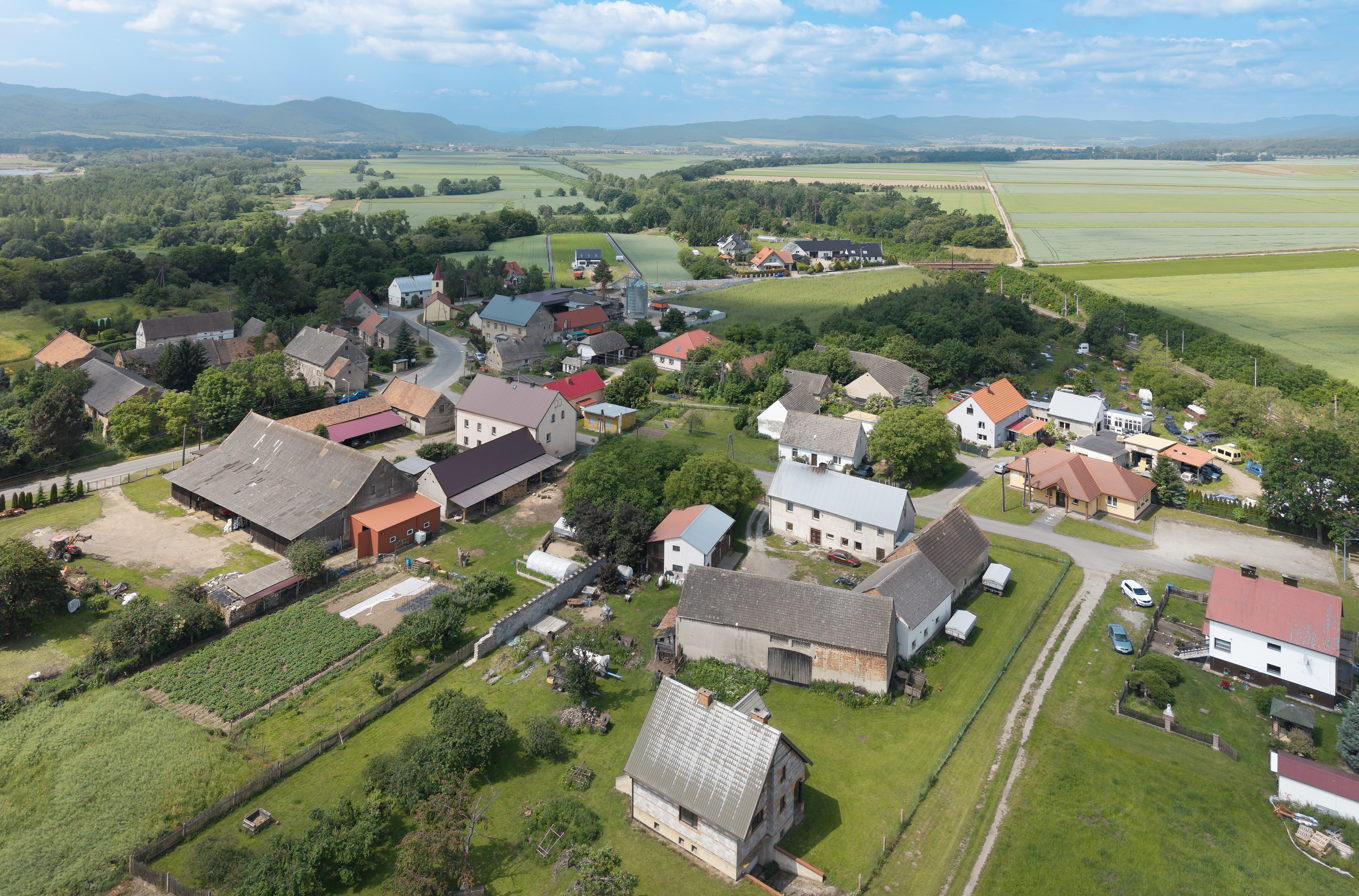

- Location within Poland
- Coordinates: 50°31′47″N 16°49′33″E
- Country: Poland
- Voivodeship: Lower Silesian
- County: Ząbkowice
- Gmina: Kamieniec Ząbkowicki
- Population: 80

Suszka [ˈsuʂka] is a village in the administrative district of Gmina Kamieniec Ząbkowicki, within Ząbkowice County, Lower Silesian Voivodeship, in south-western Poland.
