= Bílá Voda =

- Municipality
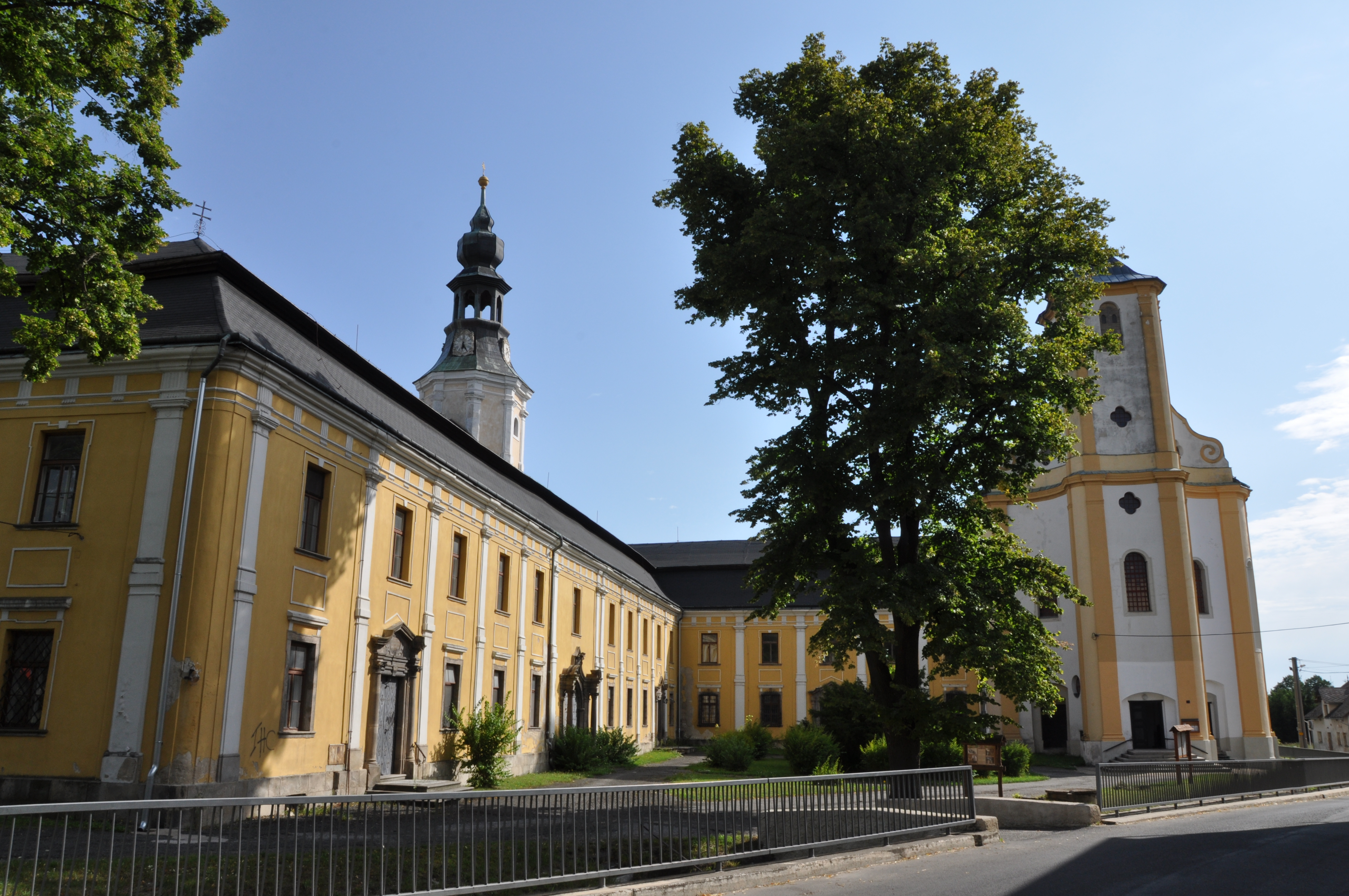
- Former Piarist college and Church of the Visitation of Our Lady

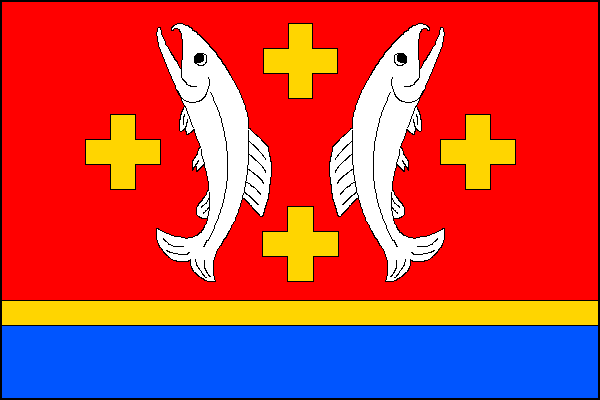
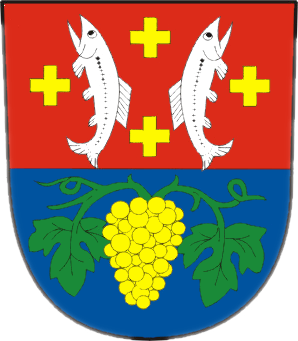
- Flag Coat of arms

- Location in the Czech Republic
- Coordinates: 50°26′31″N 16°54′57″E
- Country: Czech Republic
- Region: Olomouc
- District: Jeseník
- First mentioned: 1532

Area
  - Total: 14.99 km^{2} (5.79 sq mi)
- Elevation: 305 m (1,001 ft)

Population (2026-01-01)
  - Total: 336
  - Density: 22.4/km^{2} (58.1/sq mi)
- Time zone: UTC+1 (CET)
  - Summer (DST): UTC+2 (CEST)
- Postal code: 790 69
- Website: www.bilavoda.cz

Bílá Voda (German: Weißwasser, Polish: Biała Woda) is a municipality and village in Jeseník District in the Olomouc Region of the Czech Republic. It has about 300 inhabitants.

== Administrative division ==
Bílá Voda consists of three municipal parts (in brackets population according to the 2021 census):

- Městys Bílá Voda (214)
- Ves Bílá Voda (62)
- Kamenička (94)

== Etymology ==
Bílá Voda is named after the eponymous stream in the village. The name literally means 'white water' in Czech.

== Geography ==
Bílá Voda is located about 31 kilometres (19 mi) northwest of Jeseník and 98 km (61 mi) north of Olomouc, on the border with Poland. It is located at the westernmost point of the historical region of Czech Silesia.

Bílá Voda lies in the northern part of the Golden Mountains. The highest point is the mountain Javorník at 768 m (2,520 ft) above sea level. The built-up area is situated in the valley of the stream Bílá voda, a tributary of the Eastern Neisse. About two thirds of the municipal territory are covered with forests.

== History ==
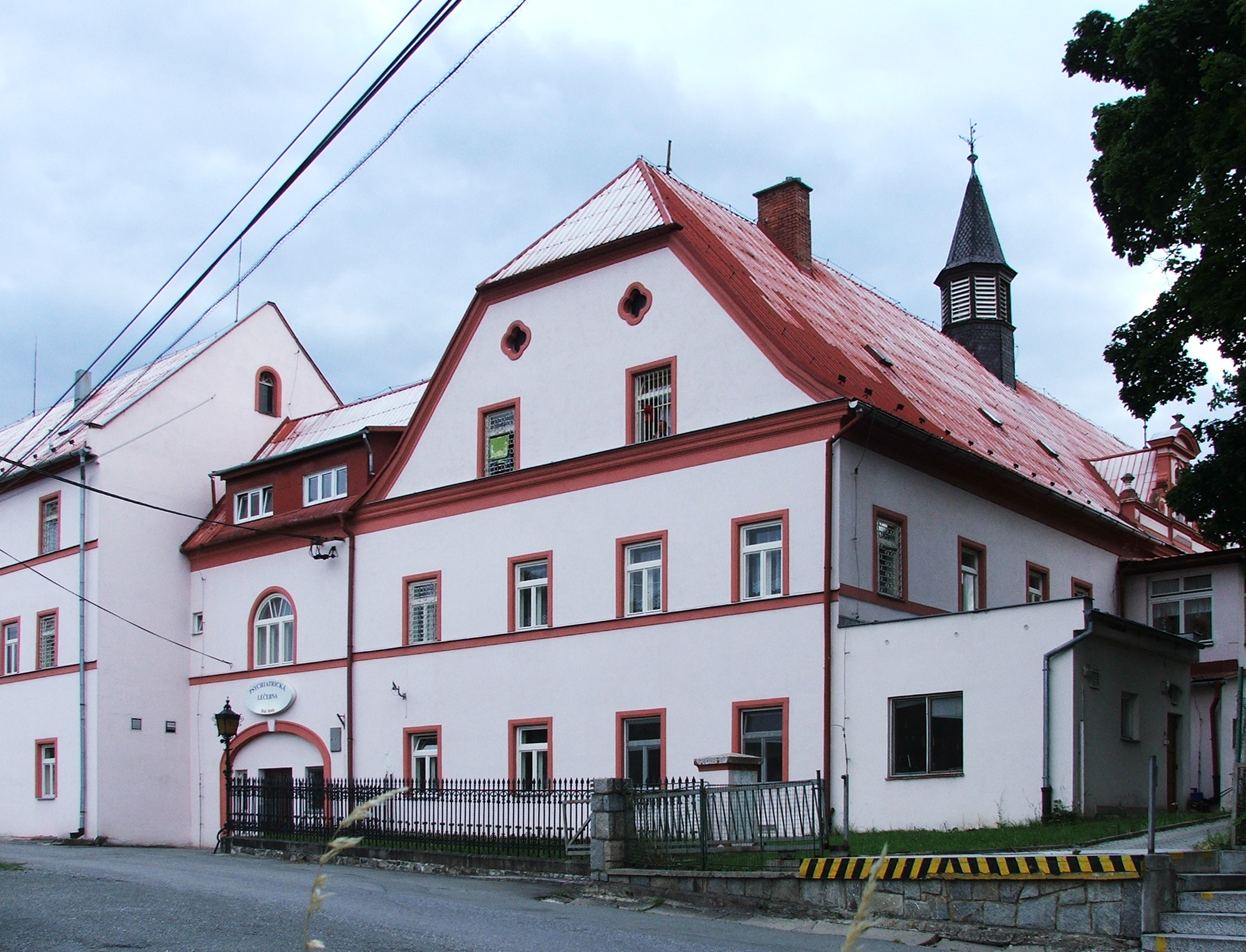
Bílá Voda Castle, today a psychiatric hospital

A village named Wyssoka was documented in the area in 1267–1271, however, it was later abandoned. The village of Bílá Voda was founded probably by the Schaffgotsch family on its site in around 1532. During the Thirty Years' War, Bílá Voda was desolated. It was inherited by the Kłodzko branch of the Liechtenstein family in 1687.

Jakob Ernst von Liechtenstein-Kastelkorn, the later Bishop of Olomouc, established here a Piarist college in 1723. As a result of the War of the Austrian Succession, in 1742 most of Silesia was separated from the Habsburg monarchy. Although Bílá Voda became the place of signing the protocol on the division of Silesia, it turned into a border village of the Bohemian Kingdom within Austrian Silesia, limited on almost all sides by state borders. The Piarist college was abolished in 1829.

In 1850, Bílá Voda was incorporated directly into the Kingdom of Bohemia, and after World War I it became part of the newly established state of Czechoslovakia.

Upon the 1938 Munich Agreement the area was annexed by Nazi Germany and incorporated into the Reichsgau Sudetenland. During World War II, the German administration operated the E200 forced labour subcamp of the Stalag VIII-B/344 prisoner-of-war camp for Allied POWs, and a subcamp of the Gross-Rosen concentration camp for Jewish women in the village. In 1945, following Germany's defeat in the war, the municipality was restored to Czechoslovakia. After 1945, the German-speaking population was expelled according to the Beneš decrees and Potsdam Agreement.

Due to the remote location of the municipality, resettling of Bílá Voda after the war was difficult. From 1951 to 1989, the municipality was used for the internment of nuns from all over the country. Gradually, perhaps the largest ecclesial community in Europe gathered here, numbering up to 450 nuns at a time; gradually about 1,000 nuns lived here. The gradual departure of the nuns after 1989 caused a further decline of the population of Bílá Voda.

== Demographics ==
Historical population

Year	Pop.	±%
1869	1,475	—
1880	1,470	−0.3%
1890	1,330	−9.5%
1900	1,277	−4.0%
1910	1,166	−8.7%

Year	Pop.	±%
1921	1,182	+1.4%
1930	1,104	−6.6%
1950	465	−57.9%
1961	673	+44.7%
1970	539	−19.9%

Year	Pop.	±%
1980	588	+9.1%
1991	546	−7.1%
2001	316	−42.1%
2011	460	+45.6%
2021	370	−19.6%

Source: Censuses

== Transport ==
The Czech–Polish road border crossing Bílá Voda / Złoty Stok is located in the municipality.

== Sights ==
The most important historical monuments is the former Piarist college and its Church of the Visitation of Our Lady. The church was originally built in 1602–1604 and rebuilt in the Baroque style in 1777.

The knight's residence, which was completed by Jakob Ernst von Liechtenstein-Kastelkorn in the 18th century, houses today a psychiatric hospital.
