= Doboszowice =

- Village
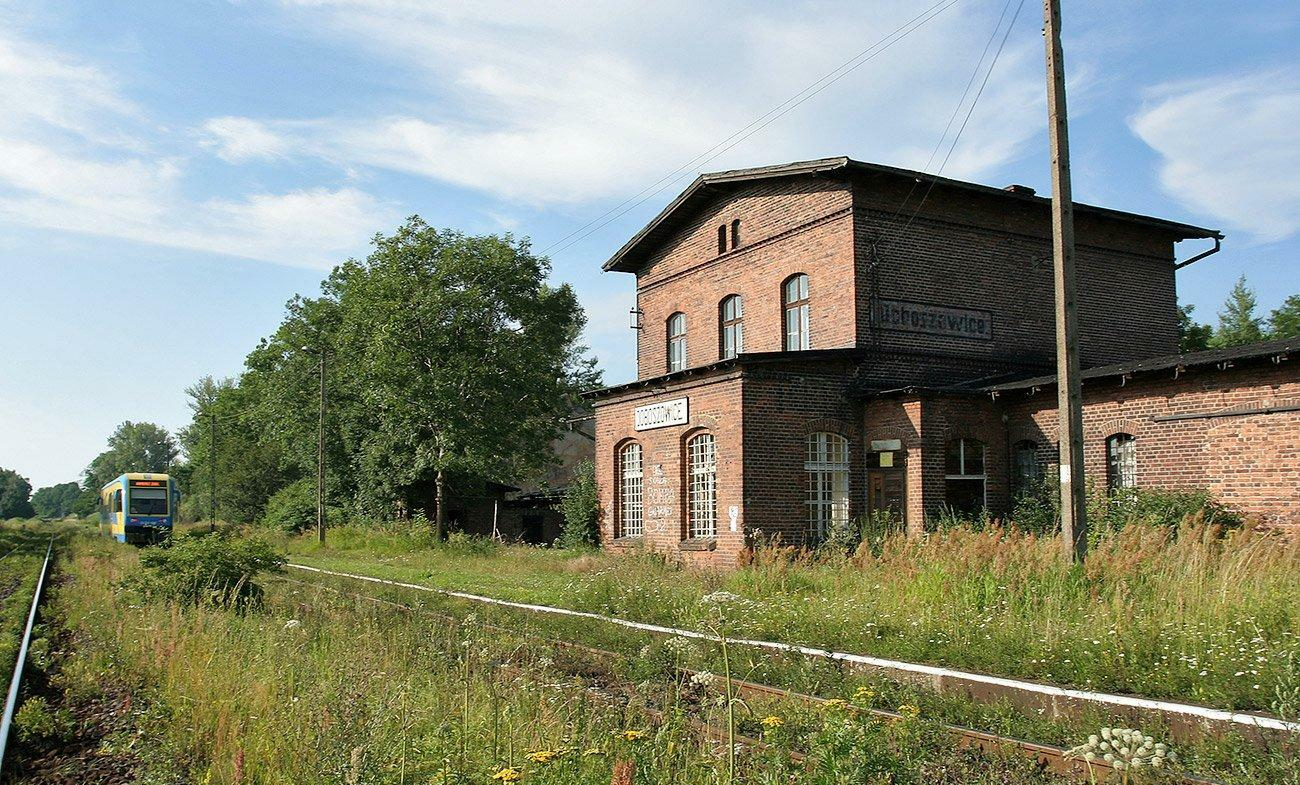
- Railway station

- Location within Poland
- Coordinates: 50°31′N 16°57′E
- Country: Poland
- Voivodeship: Lower Silesian
- County: Ząbkowice
- Gmina: Kamieniec Ząbkowicki

Doboszowice [dɔbɔʂɔˈvit͡sɛ] is a village in the administrative district of Gmina Kamieniec Ząbkowicki, within Ząbkowice County, Lower Silesian Voivodeship, in south-western Poland.
