= Joanna Kołaczkowska =

Polish actress (1966–2025)

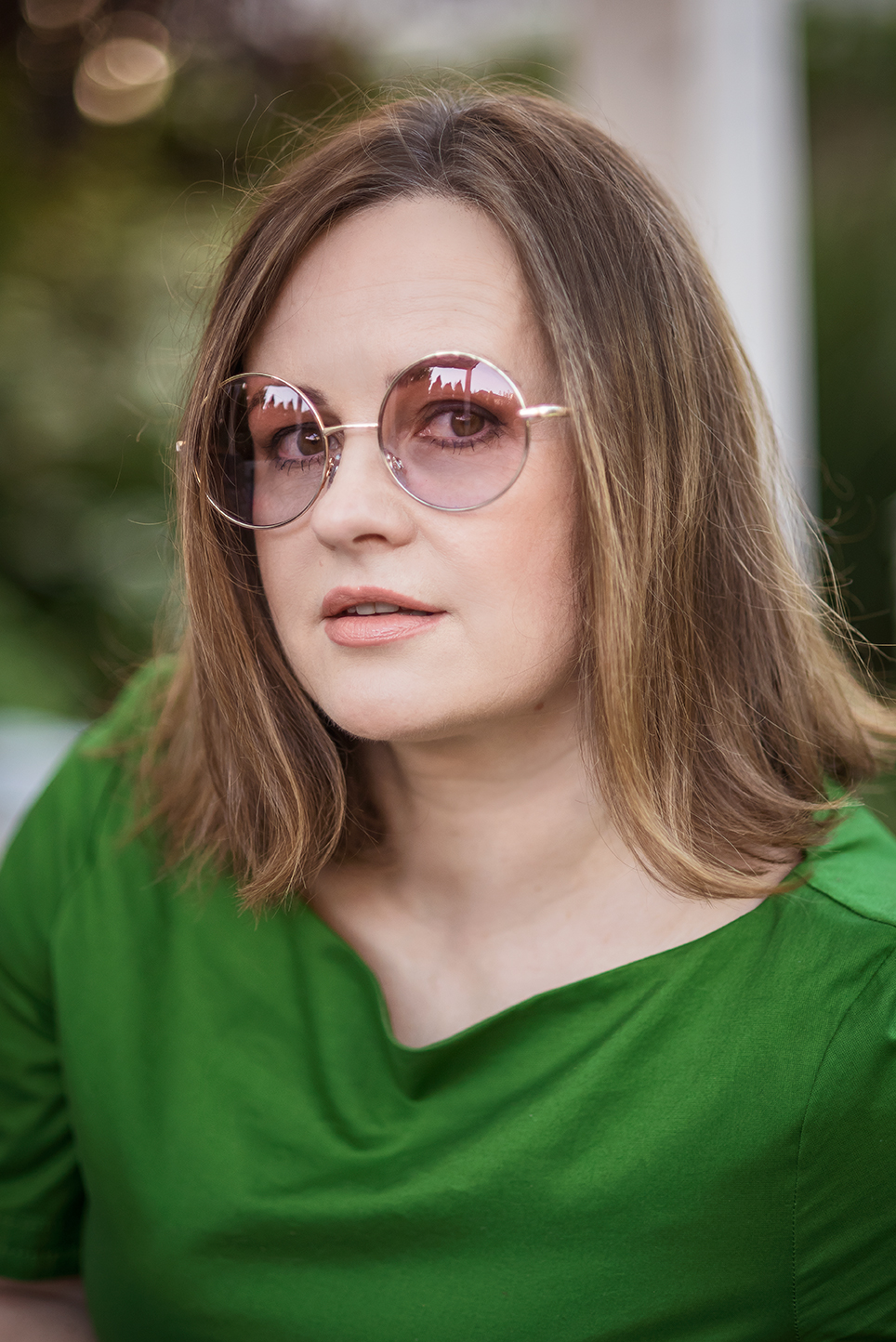
- Kołaczkowska in 2021
- Born: Joanna Dorota Chuda; 22 June 1966; Polkowice, Poland
- Died: 17 July 2025 (aged 59); Konstancin-Jeziorna, Poland
- Resting place: Powązki Military Cemetery
- Education: University of Zielona Góra
- Known for: Cabaret performance, theatre
- Notable work: Hrabi Cabaret troupe
- Style: Comedy, satire
- Honours: Ribbon

Joanna Dorota Kołaczkowska (de domo Chuda, primo voto Matysik, 22 June 1966 – 17 July 2025) was a Polish cabaret performer, theatre actress, songwriter and radio presenter. She was widely recognized as one of the most prominent figures in Polish cabaret in the early 21st century, particularly through her long-standing involvement with the Hrabi Cabaret troupe, with which she performed from 2002 until 2025.

== Life and career ==
Kołaczkowska was born Joanna Dorota Chuda on 22 June 1966 in Polkowice. Her mother was an accountant at the Mining Works Company in Lubin, while her father died when she was five. She had an older sister, Agnieszka, who married Dariusz Kamys. In her early years, she was part of a folk dance group and trained in both figure skating and speed skating. She graduated in cultural and educational pedagogy from the Pedagogical University in Zielona Góra, now integrated into the University of Zielona Góra.

While studying at university, she met Adam Nowak, who in 1987 encouraged her to audition for the cabaret troupe Drugi Garnitur. She remained with the ensemble until 1989, after which she joined Potem Cabaret as a performer and contributed as a writer to several of its sketches. Between 1991 and 1993, she appeared with Potem as a supporting act for Stanisław Tym’s productions at the Rampa Theatre. The group formally disbanded in 1999.

Since 2002 she had been a standing member of the Hrabi Cabaret troupe. In 2005, she received an individual award at the 1st Cabaret Festival in Zielona Góra.

Throughout her career, she acted in a number of films, including Robin Hood – The Fourth Arrow (1997), Dr. Jekyll and Mr. Hyde by A'Yoy (1999), and was also the Polish dubbing actress for Donna Noble on Doctor Who in 2023.

Between 2009 and 2010, she appeared on the stage of Teatr Polonia in Warsaw in theatrical productions directed by Stanisław Tym, including Dżdżownice wychodzą na asfalt (2009, lit. 'Earthworms come out onto the asphalt') and Kobieta z widokiem na taras (2010, lit. 'Woman with a view of the terrace'). In 2011, she portrayed Mrs. Zerżniewska in Smuteczek, czyli ostatni naiwni (lit. 'Little sadness, that is the last naïve ones'), directed by Maciej Stuhr and staged at the Teatr Dramatyczny in Warsaw. In 2017, she joined the cast of Dzień świra (lit. 'Day of the madman'), directed by Marcin Kołaczkowski and presented at Teatr Kamienica. On 30 July 2019, she gave the premiere performance of her solo recital entitled Pączek w Maśle (lit. 'Doughnut in butter').

In April 2025 the Hrabi Cabaret troupe publicly disclosed that Kołaczkowska was undergoing cancer treatment and therefore placed her public appearances on hold. During May, five benefit shows in Warsaw, Gdańsk and Zabrze—staged under the Potemowe piosenki (lit. 'Potem’s songs') tour—were expressly dedicated to her support. In June, Hrabi joined forces with Radio Nowy Świat and the Teatr Współczesny in Warsaw to mount a further charity performance, Dla Ciebie mógłbym zrobić wszystko (lit. 'I Could Do Anything for You'), likewise devoted to Kołaczkowska.

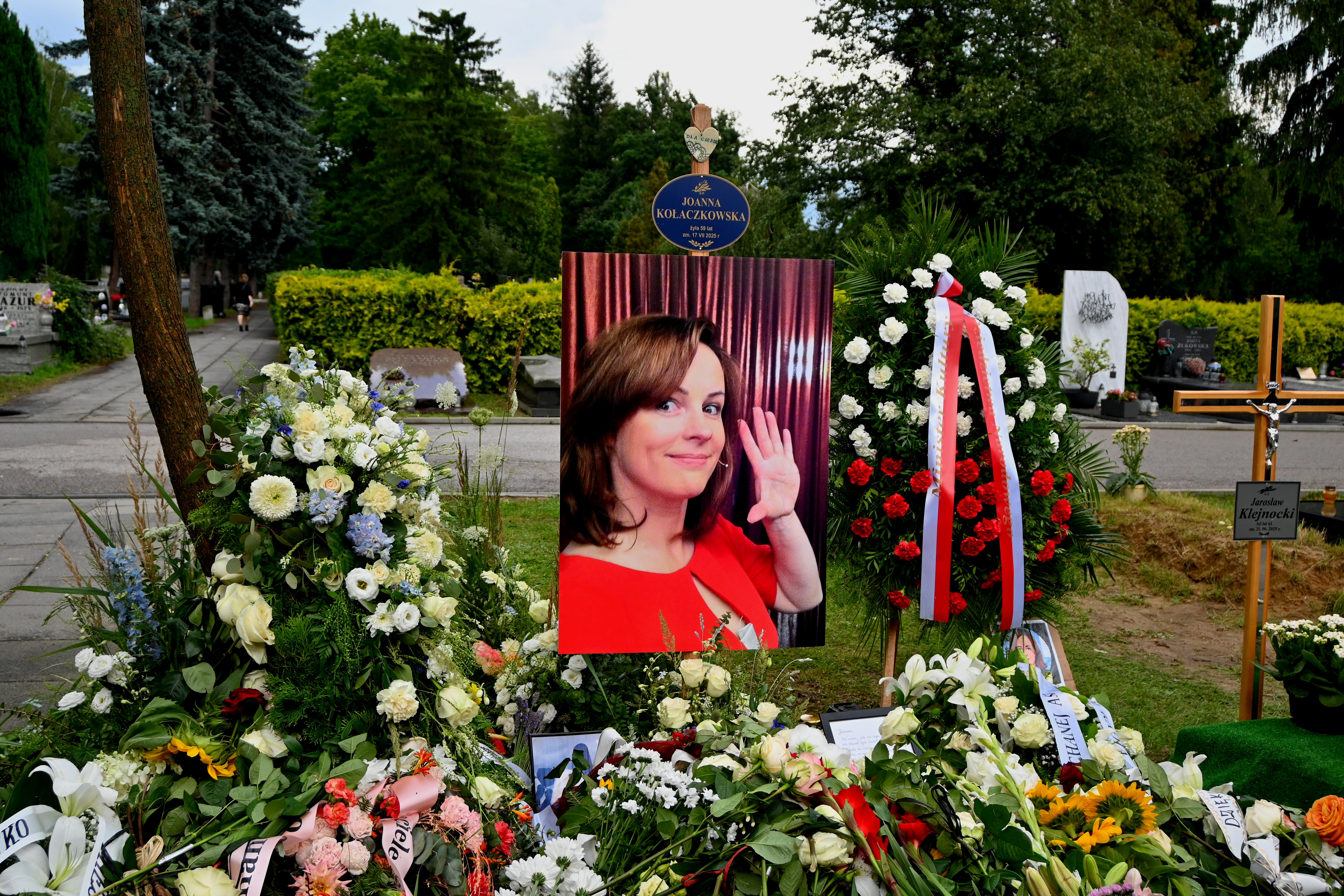
Joanna Kołaczkowska's grave in the Avenue of the Meritorious at Powązki Military Cemetery, on the day of the funeral

She died during the night of 16–17 July 2025. The certified cause of death was a brain tumour. She was buried on 28 July 2025 at the Powązki Military Cemetery in Warsaw. The funeral drew large crowds, including fellow artists, friends, and fans. A Catholic mass was held at St. Charles Borromeo Church, followed by a secular ceremony in accordance with her wishes.

== Awards ==
- Knight's Cross of the Order of Polonia Restituta (2025, posthumously)
