= Jerzy Baksalary =

Polish mathematician (1944–2005)

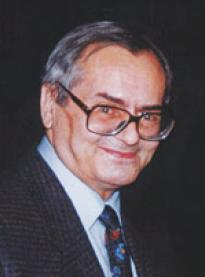
- Baksalary in 1993
- Born: 25 June 1944; Poznań, Poland
- Died: 8 March 2005 (aged 60); Poznań, Poland

Academic background
- Education: Adam Mickiewicz University

Academic work
- Discipline: Mathematics
- Sub-discipline: Linear algebra Mathematical statistics
- Institutions: University of Tampere; University of Zielona Góra

Jerzy Kazimierz Baksalary (25 June 1944 – 8 March 2005) was a Polish mathematician who specialized in mathematical statistics and linear algebra. In 1990 he was appointed professor of mathematical sciences. He authored over 170 academic papers published and won one of the Ministry of National Education awards.

== Biography ==
=== Early life and education (1944 – 1988) ===
Baksalary was born in Poznań, Poland on 25 June 1944. From 1969 to 1988, he worked at the Agricultural University of Poznań.

In 1975, Baksalary received a PhD degree from Adam Mickiewicz University in Poznań; his thesis on linear statistical models was supervised by Tadeusz Caliński. He received a Habilitation in 1984, also from Adam Mickiewicz University, where his Habilitationsschrift was also on linear statistical models.

=== Career (1988 – 2005) ===
In 1988, Baksalary joined the Tadeusz Kotarbiński Pedagogical University in Zielona Góra, Poland, being the university's rector from 1990 to 1996. In 1990, he became a "Professor of Mathematical Sciences", a title received from the President of Poland. For the 1989–1990 academic year, he moved to the University of Tampere in Finland. Later on, he joined the University of Zielona Góra.

=== 2005 death and legacy ===
Baksalary died in Poznań on 8 March 2005. His funeral was held there on 15 March 2005. There, Caliński praised Baksalary for his "contributions to the Poznań school of mathematical statistics and biometry".

Memorial events in honor of Baksalary were also held at two conferences after his death:

- The 14th International Workshop on Matrices and Statistics, held at Massey University in New Zealand from 29 March to 1 April 2005.
- The Southern Ontario Matrices and Statistics Days, held at the University of Windsor in Canada from 9 to 10 June 2005.

== Research ==
In 1979, Baksalary and Radosław Kala proved that the matrix equation $AX - YB = C$ has a solution for some matrices X and Y if and only if $(I - A^-A)C(I - B^-B) = 0$. (Here, $A^-$ denotes some g-inverse of the matrix A.) This is equivalent to a 1952 result by W. E. Roth on the same equation, which states that the equation has a solution iff the ranks of the block matrices
$$\begin{bmatrix}
A & C\\
0 & B\\
\end{bmatrix}$$
and
$$\begin{bmatrix}
A & 0\\
0 & B\\
\end{bmatrix}$$
are equal.

In 1980, he and Kala extended this result to the matrix equation $AXB + CYD = E$, proving that it can be solved if and only if $K_GK_AE = 0, K_AER_D = 0, K_CER_B = 0, ER_BR_H = 0$, where $G := K_AC$ and $H := DR_B$. (Here, the notation $K_M := I - MM^-$, $R_M := I - M^-M$ is adopted for any matrix M.)

In 1981, Baksalary and Kala proved that for a Gauss-Markov model $\{y, X\beta, V\}$, where the vector-valued variable has expectation $X\beta$ and variance V (a dispersion matrix), then for any function F, a best linear unbiased estimator of $X\beta$ which is a function of $Fy$ exists iff $C(X)\subset C(TF')$. The condition is equivalent to stating that $r(X\vdots TF') = r(X)$, where $r(\cdot)$ denotes the rank of the respective matrix.

In 1995, Baksalary and Sujit Kumar Mitra introduced the "left-star" and "right-star" partial orderings on the set of complex matrices, which are defined as follows. The matrix A is below the matrix B in the left-star ordering, written $A ~*< B$, iff $A^*A = A^*B$ and $\mathcal{M}(A)\subseteq \mathcal{M}(B)$, where $\mathcal{M}(\cdot)$ denotes the column span and $A^*$ denotes the conjugate transpose. Similarly, A is below B in the right-star ordering, written $A <*~ B$, iff $AA^* = BA^*$ and $\mathcal{M}(A^*) \subseteq \mathcal{M}(B^*)$.

In 2000, Jerzy Baksalary and Oskar Maria Baksalary characterized all situations when a linear combination $P = c_1P_1 + c_2P_2$ of two idempotent matrices can itself be idempotent. These include three previously known cases $P = P_1 + P_2$, $P = P_1 - P_2$, or $P = P_2 - P_1$, previously found by Rao and Mitra (1971); and one additional case where $c_2 = 1 - c_1$ and $(P_1 - P_2)^2 = 0$.
