= Mirosław Kowalik =

Mirosław Kowalik may refer to:

- Mirosław Kowalik (speedway rider) (born 1969), former motorcycle speedway rider and current coach
- Mirosław Kowalik (born 1965), Polish musician with Raz, Dwa, Trzy
