= Krzysztof Szwagrzyk =

Polish historian, publicist and writer

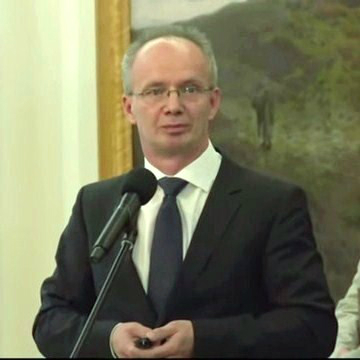
- Born: 15 February 1964 (age 62); Strzegom
- Education: University of Wrocław; University of Zielona Góra
- Occupations: historian, author ISBN 83-86788-46-1
- Writing career
- Notable awards: Order of Polonia Restituta; Cross of Merit; Medal of the Centenary of Regained Independence; Medal "For Merit to Polish Science Sapientia et Veritas"

Krzysztof Szwagrzyk (born 15 February 1964 in Strzegom) is a Polish historian, publicist and writer, since 1979 living and working in Wrocław, Poland. Szwagrzyk received his doctoral degree in 20th-century history from the University of Wrocław in 1996. He serves as president of the Public Information Bureau of the Institute of National Remembrance regional chapter in Wrocław, and is the author of numerous scientific papers and several monographs about contemporary Polish history, with special focus on the system of political repressions during the period of Stalinism in Poland, and the anti-communist structures in Lower Silesia in the years of 1945–1956. He's the author of screenplay Golgota Wrocławska.

== Murders in the majesty of the law ==
In his monograph Zbrodnie w majestacie prawa 1944-1955 (Murders in the majesty of the law 1944-1955) Szwagrzyk focuses on the lesser known aspects of the entry into Poland by the advancing Soviet forces in 1944, resulting in the violent takeover of power by the communists. The presence of the vast number of officers and soldiers of the Red Army across Poland allowed for the creation of state apparatus the likes of which have never been seen before. A number of laws and regulations were introduced between 1944 and 1946 mirroring the Soviet model, which allowed for the arrest and persecution of military and civilian representatives of the Polish Underground State with indiscriminate use of death penalty. In the following decade over 5 thousand civilian Poles received death sentence from the army in the majesty of the law. In total, some 50,000 people perished in Poland during the communist takeover.

== Works ==
- Krzysztof Szwagrzyk, Zbrodnie w majestacie prawa 1944-1955, Wydawn. ABC, Warszawa, 2000; 389 pages, ISBN 83-86788-46-1.
- Krzysztof Szwagrzyk, Jaworzno: historia więzienia dla młodocianych więźniów politycznych 1951-1955, Wydawn. "Klio", 1999; 431 pages. ISBN 83-86833-20-3.
- Krzysztof Szwagrzyk, Winni? – niewinni? Dolnośląskie podziemie niepodległościowe (1945-1956) w świetle dokumentów sądowych, Fundacja PL "Niezawislosc", 1999; 430 pages. ISBN 83-902803-3-7.
- Krzysztof Szwagrzyk, Prawnicy czasu bezprawia: sędziowie i prokuratorzy wojskowi w Polsce, 1944-1956, "Societas Vistulana", 2005 - Instytut Pamięci Narodowej Komisja Ścigania Zbrodni przeciwko Narodowi Polskiemu - 2005 - 551 pages. ISBN 83-88385-65-8.
- Krzysztof Szwagrzyk, Golgota Wrocławska: 1945-1956, - 1996 - Klio
- Krzysztof Szwagrzyk, Straceni na Dolnym Śląsku 1945-1956, Instytut Europejskich Studiów Społecznych, 2002; 193 pages. ISBN 83-88120-91-3.
- Krzysztof Szwagrzyk with R. Czaplińska Z archiwum pamięci...: 3653 więzienne dni, - 2003
- Krzysztof Szwagrzyk, Historia przygotowań do amerykańskiego desantu pod Wrocławiem (1949-1952), - Pamięć i Sprawiedliwość, 2003
- Krzysztof Szwagrzyk, Listy do Bieruta: prośby o ułaskawienie z lat 1946-1956, - 1995 - Wydawn. "Klio"
- Krzysztof Szwagrzyk, Aparat bezpieczeństwa w Polsce: 1944-1956, Volume 1, Instytut Pamięci Narodowej, 2005; 603 pages. ISBN 83-89078-94-5.
- Krzysztof Szwagrzyk, Skazani na karę śmierci przez Wojskowy Sąd Rejonowy we Wrocławiu, 1946-1955, - 2002 - Instytut Pamięci Narodowej
- Krzysztof Szwagrzyk, Sędzia-śmierć. Działalność sędziego Włodzimierza Ostapowicza na Białostocczyźnie (1946–1947), - Biuletyn Instytutu Pamięci Narodowej, 2005
