= Polkowice =

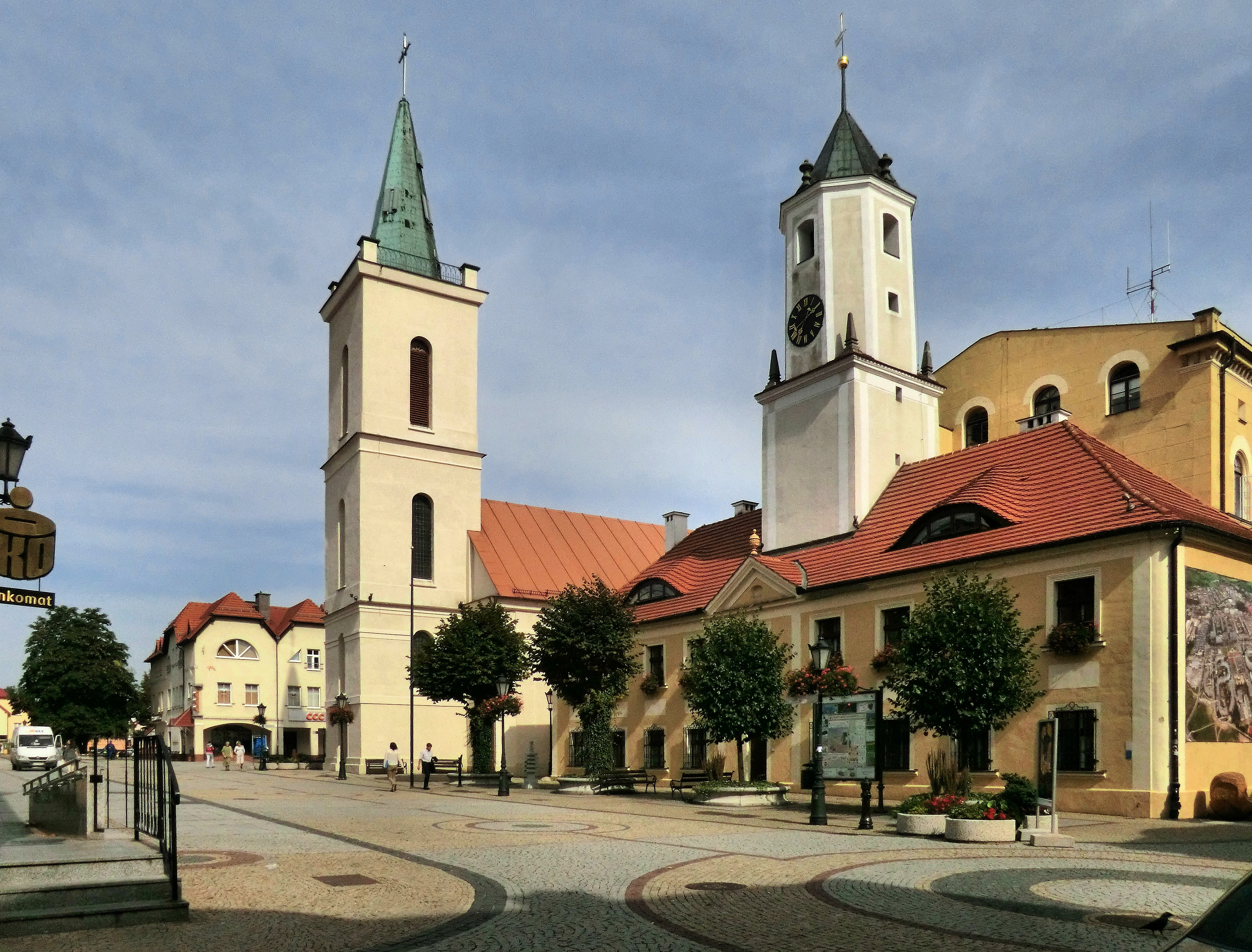
- Market Square with the town hall and St. Barbara Church

- Flag Coat of arms

- Location within Poland
- Coordinates: 51°30′N 16°04′E
- Country: Poland
- Voivodeship: Lower Silesian
- County: Polkowice
- Gmina: Polkowice
- Town rights: 13th century

Government
  - Mayor: Wiesław Wabik

Area
  - Total: 23.75 km^{2} (9.17 sq mi)

Population (2019-06-30)
  - Total: 22,480
  - Density: 946.5/km^{2} (2,451/sq mi)
- Time zone: UTC+1 (CET)
  - Summer (DST): UTC+2 (CEST)
- Postal code: 59-100, 59-101
- Area code: +48 76
- Car plates: DPL
- Climate: Dfb
- Website: http://www.polkowice.pl

Polkowice [pɔlkɔˈvʲit͡sɛ] (German: Polkwitz) is a town in south-western Poland. It is situated in the Lower Silesian Voivodeship. The town is the seat of Polkowice County and of Gmina Polkowice.

== Geography ==
Polkowice is located in the historic Lower Silesia, about 15 km (9 mi) northwest of Lubin. The nearest airport serving international destinations is Wrocław Airport, located 72 km (45 mi) from Polkowice.

Situated in a historic mining region, the town is part of the largest industrial copper-extraction area in Poland, with a copper-processing plant operating nearby. Nearby Polkowice Dolne is the site of a former State Agricultural Farm (PGR) and, since 1998, of a Volkswagen diesel engine plant, another major employer in the region.

Designated as an urban-type settlement from 1945, Polkowice regained town status in 1967. In 1975–1998 it was in the former Legnica Voivodeship.

== History ==
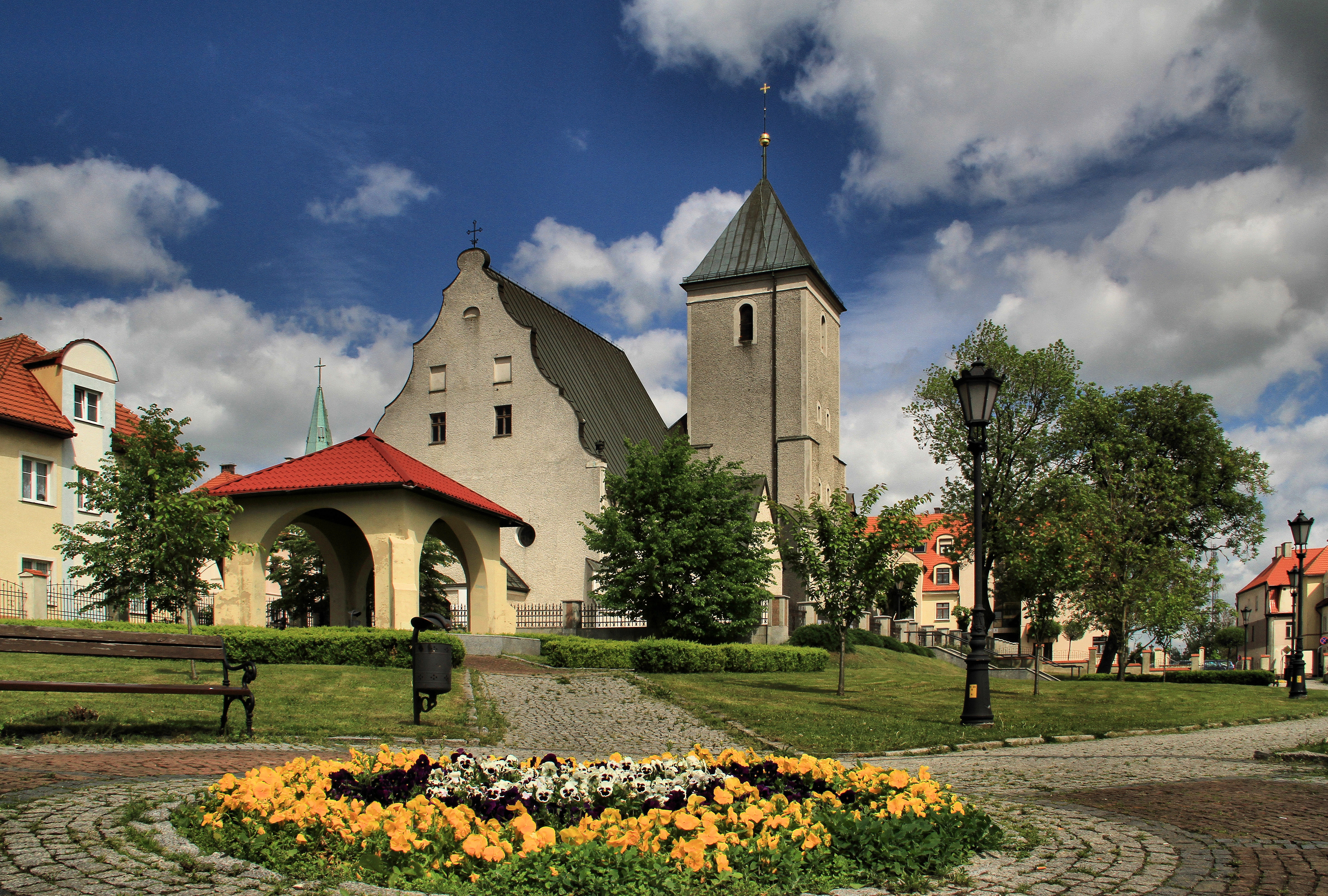
St Michael Archangel Church

The name of the town is probably derived from Slavic (Old Polish) Boleslaw, meaning "great glory", a favoured dynastic name in the Polish royal House of Piast. According to legend, The Silesian duke Bolesław I the Tall (1127–1201) had a hunting lodge erected near the later town, later called Bolkewice or, adjusted to the German pronunciation, Polkovicz (1333). In the Statuta synodalia episcoporum Wratislaviensium from 1475 the town is named Polkewicze and Polkowice. As a result of the fragmentation of Poland into smaller duchies, it became part of the Duchy of Silesia, and later on the Duchy of Głogów. Polkowice was mentioned as a town (civitas) in a 1276 deed. It remained part of the Duchy of Głogów, ruled by the Polish houses of Piast and Jagiellon, including future Polish kings John I Albert and Sigismund I the Old, until the duchy's dissolution in 1506, when it was incorporated into the Bohemian (Czech) Kingdom under the Holy Roman Empire.

Parts of the medieval town wwere destroyed by a blaze in 1457, it suffered further damage during the Thirty Years' War and by a plague epidemic in 1680. After the First Silesian War in 1742, it was annexed by Prussia and later incorporated into the Province of Silesia. During the Napoleonic Wars, the town was visited by Napoleon twice, in 1807 and 1812. The town was renamed Heerwegen in 1937 by German Nazi authorities during a campaign of erasing place names of Polish origin. During World War II, a German forced labour subcamp of the prison in Jawor operated in the present-day district of Polkowice Dolne. On January 11, 1945, the German administration evacuated the population, leaving only the army in the town. On February 9, 1945, the town was captured by the Red Army. Afterwards the abandoned town became part of Poland, in accordance with the preliminary border regulations of the Potsdam Agreement. The town was repopulated by Poles, many displaced from former eastern Poland annexed by the Soviet Union.

In 2005 the neighbouring village of Polkowice Dolne was included within the town limits.

== Education ==
- Lower Silesian College of Enterprise and Technology (Dolnośląska Wyższa Szkoła Przedsiębiorczości i Techniki)

== Sport ==
- Górnik Polkowice – football team, playing in the Polish third division. The team played in the country's top flight in season 2003-2004
- MKS Polkowice – women's basketball team, 3rd place in Sharp Torell Basket Liga in 2004/2005 season
- CCC Polsat Polkowice – Road Cycling Team UCI Professional Continental team

== Twin towns – sister cities ==
See twin towns of Gmina Polkowice

== Notable residents ==
- Fritz Thiel (1916–1943), German resistance fighter
- Joanna Kołaczkowska (1966–2025), Polish cabaret performer
- Hans Kratzert (1940–2023), German screenwriter and film director

== Gallery ==
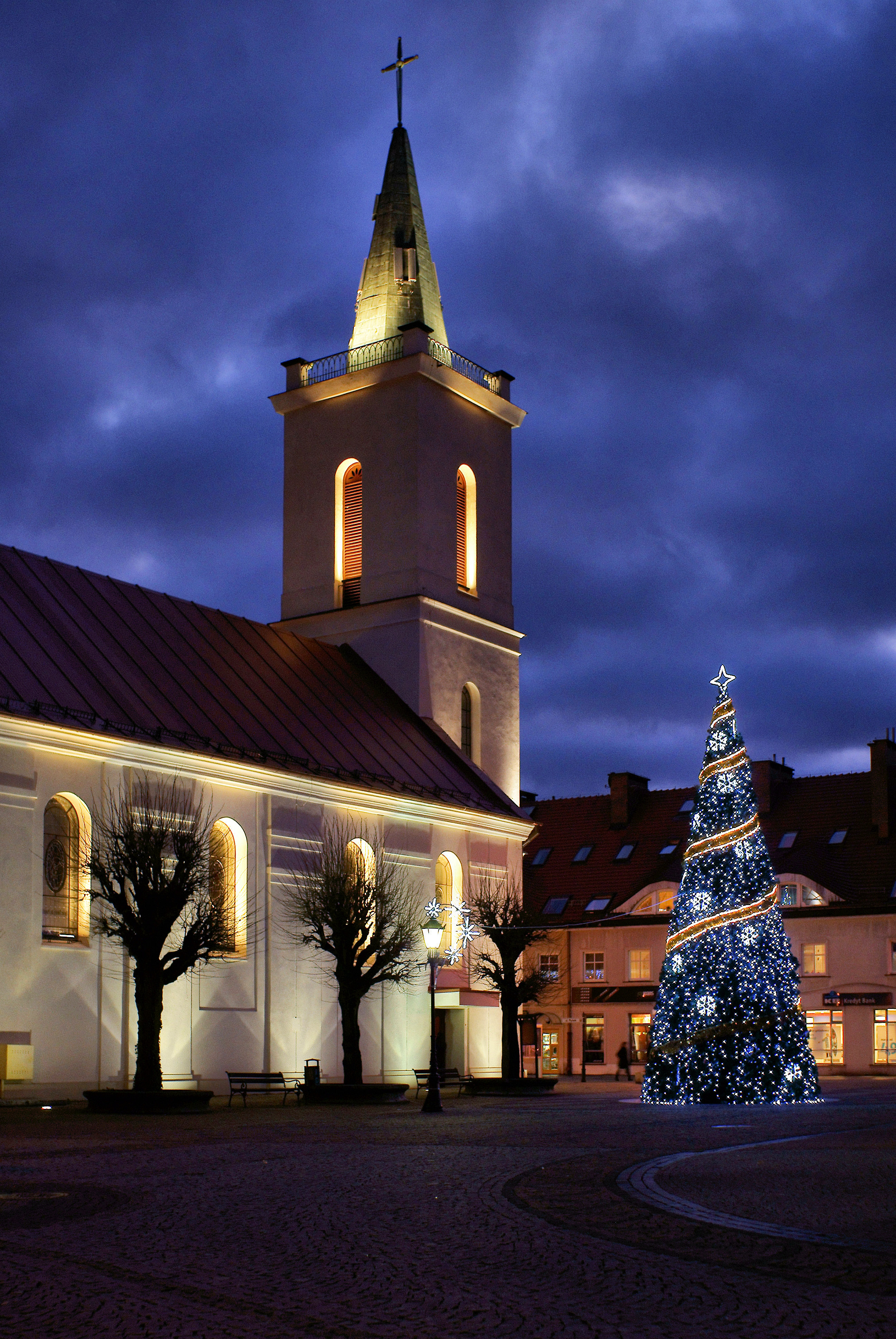
Saint Barbara church at night

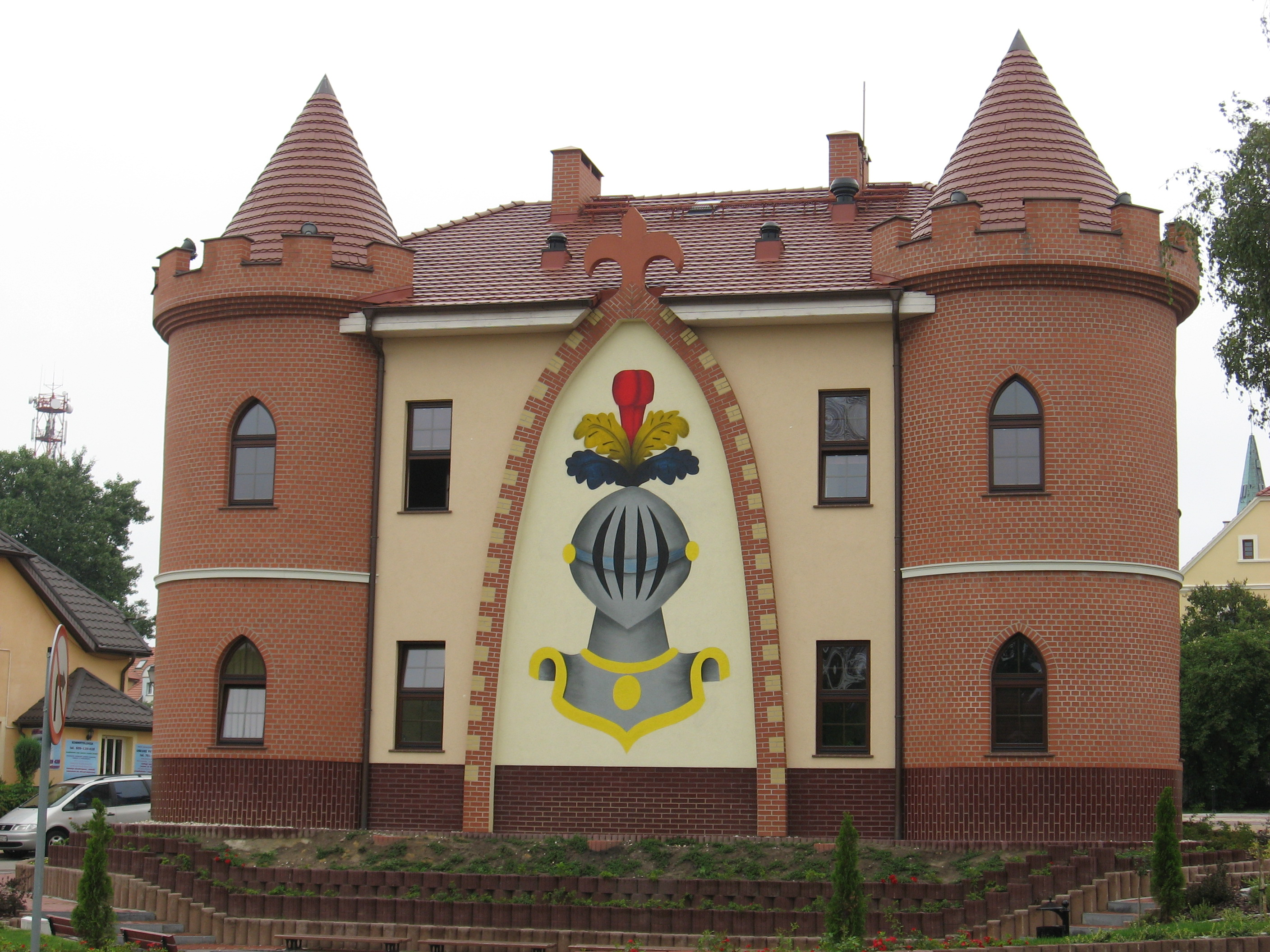
ZGZM (Copper Basin Gminas Association) Office

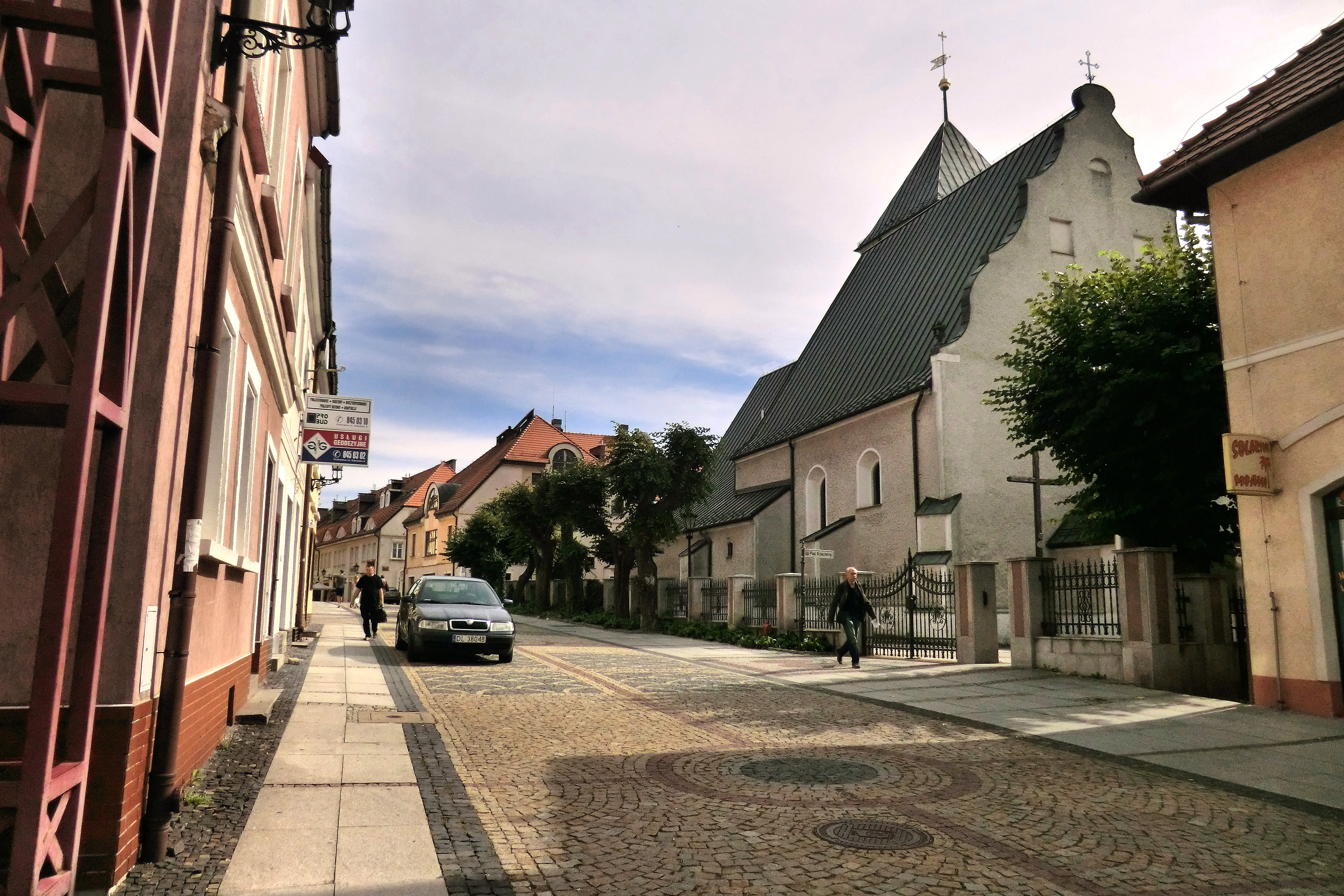
Gdańska street

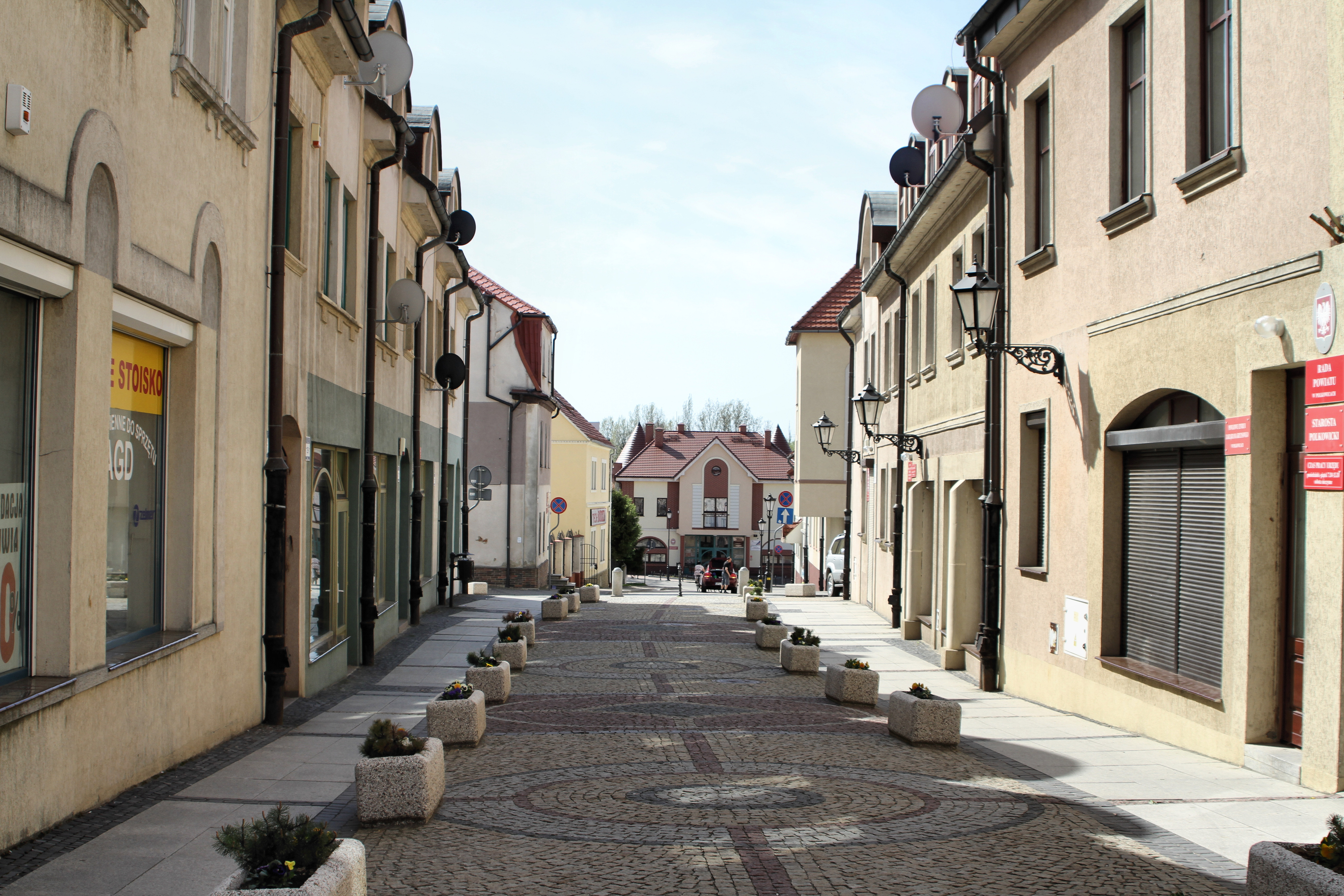
Town center

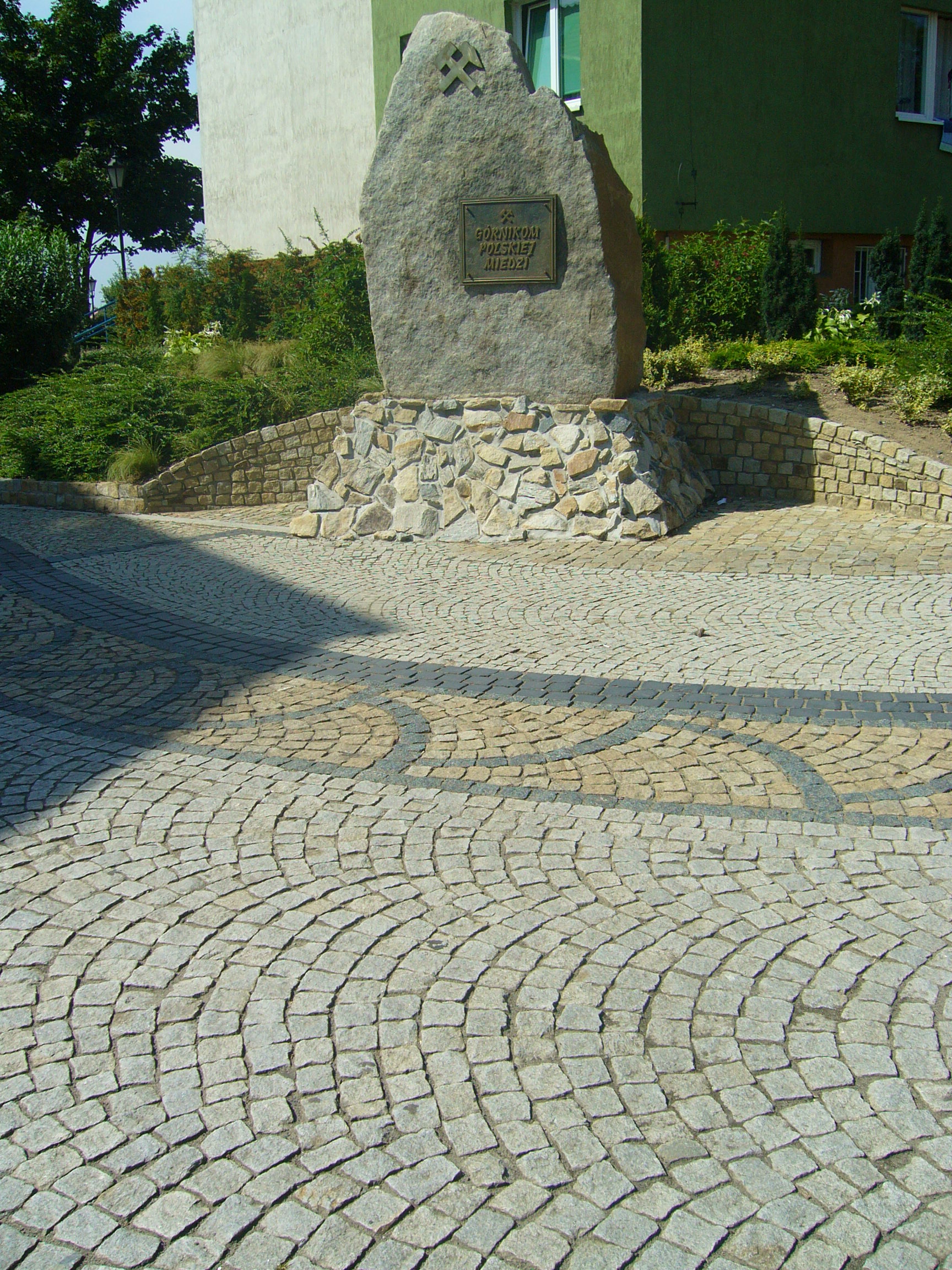
Memorial stone dedicated to Polish copper miners
