= Strzegom =

Town in Lower Silesian Voivodeship, Poland

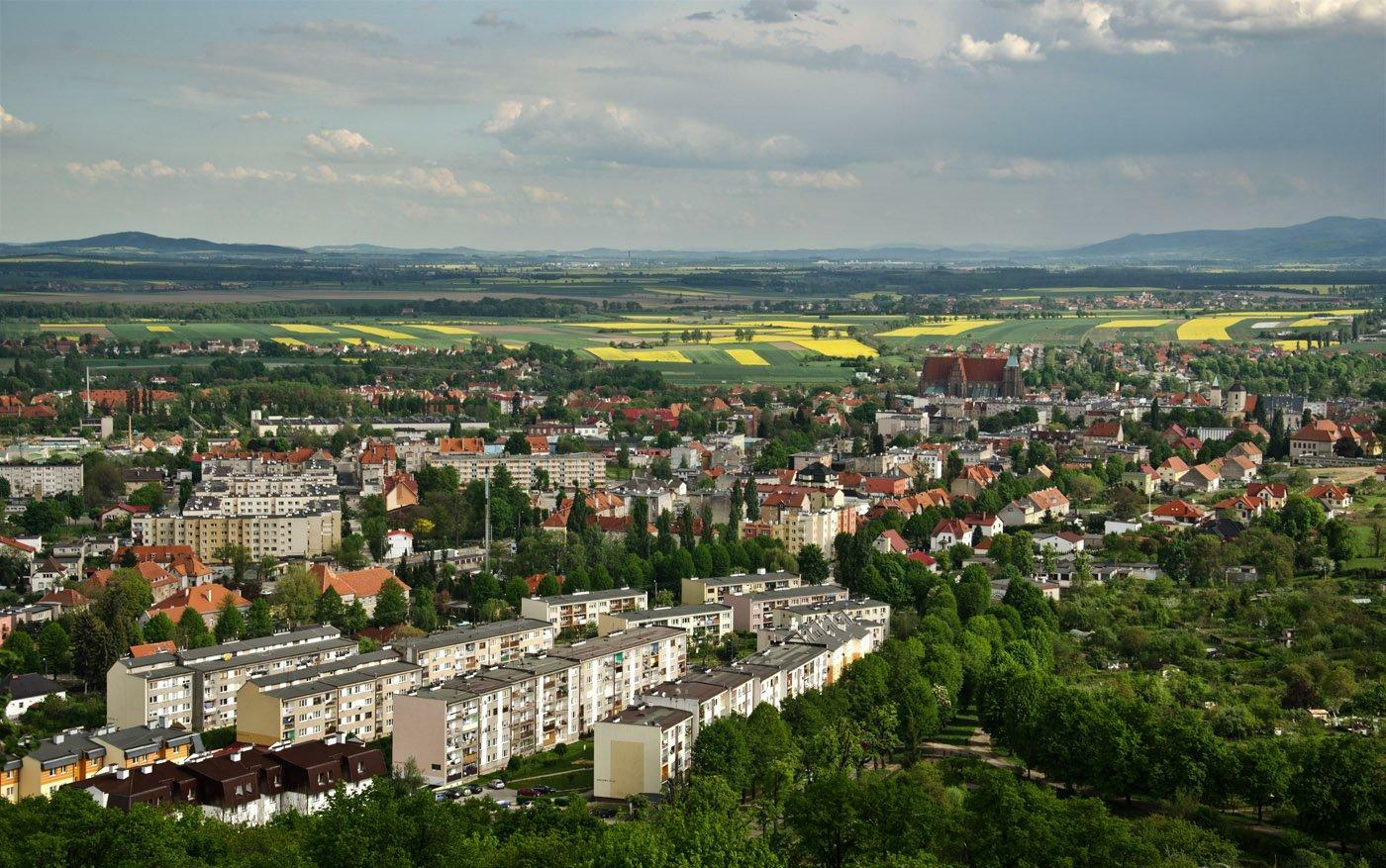
- Panorama of Strzegom

- Coat of arms
- Nickname: Capital of Polish granite
- Location within Poland
- Coordinates: 50°57′40″N 16°20′40″E
- Country: Poland
- Voivodeship: Lower Silesian
- County: Świdnica
- Gmina: Strzegom
- Founded: 10th century
- Town rights: 1242

Government
  - Mayor: Krzysztof Kalinowski

Area
  - Total: 20.49 km^{2} (7.91 sq mi)
- Elevation: 230 m (750 ft)

Population (2019-06-30)
  - Total: 16,106
  - Density: 786.0/km^{2} (2,036/sq mi)
- Time zone: UTC+1 (CET)
  - Summer (DST): UTC+2 (CEST)
- Postal code: 58-150
- Vehicle registration: DSW
- Website: https://strzegom.pl/

Strzegom [ˈstʂɛɡɔm] (German: Striegau) is a town in Świdnica County, Lower Silesian Voivodeship, in south-western Poland. It is the seat of the Gmina Strzegom administrative district (gmina).

Strzegom is one of the oldest towns in Lower Silesia, with a settlement dating back to Antiquity. In the Middle Ages Strzegom became the seat of a castellan and a centre for clothmaking, linen-making and brewing, and since the early modern period it became known for granite mining, to which it owes the title of the "capital of Polish granite". The town has a number of precious heritage sites, most notably the Basilica of Saints Peter and Paul, one of the most outstanding examples of Gothic architecture in Poland, listed as a Historic Monument of Poland.

== History ==
=== Middle Ages ===
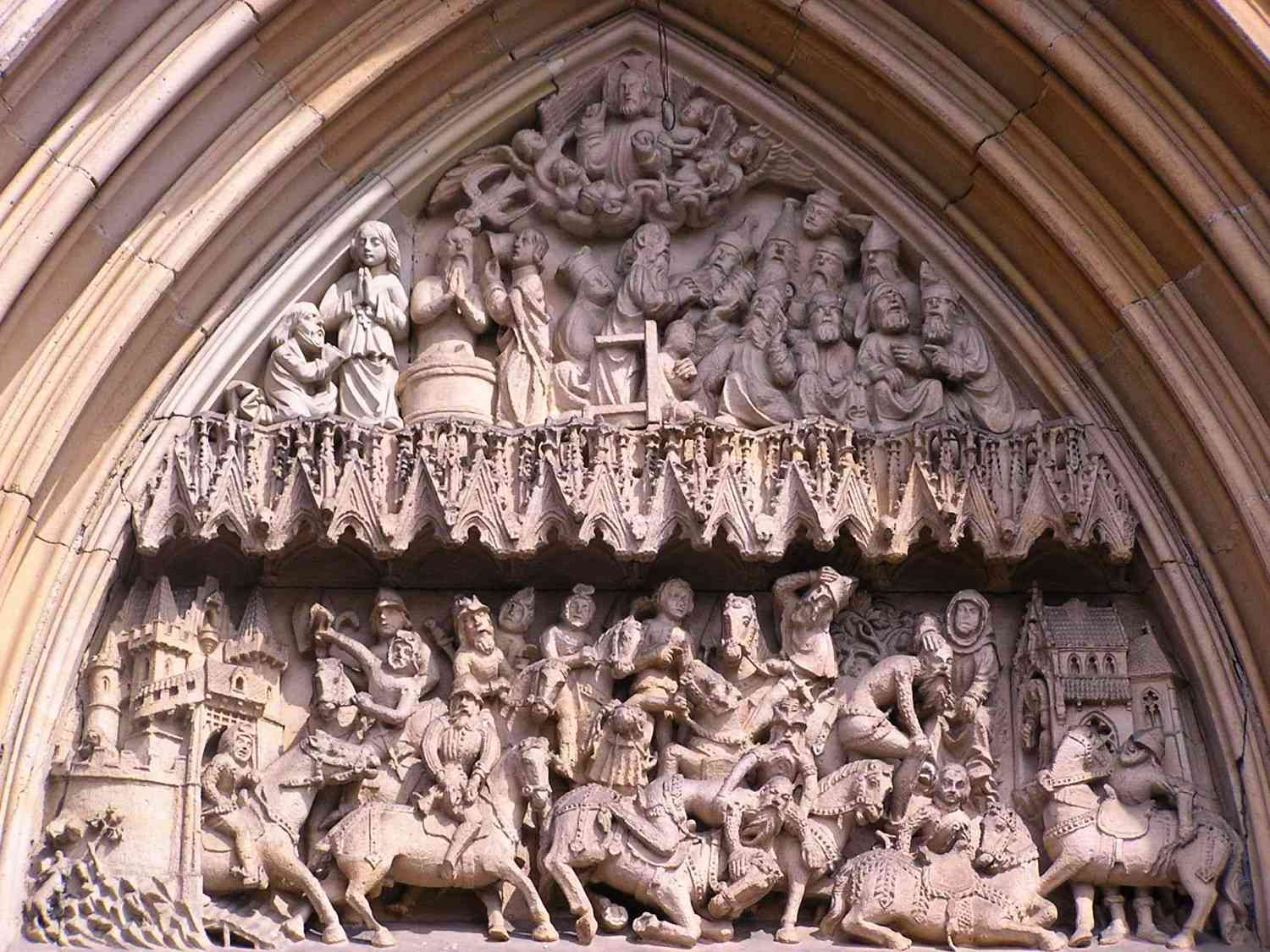
Tympanum of the Saints Peter and Paul Basilica

Traces of settlement on the site during the Roman Empire period have been found. In the Middle Ages it was a fortified settlement under the rule of a castellan, founded in the 10th century, as part of Piast Poland, first mentioned in a deed issued by Pope Hadrian IV in 1155, confirming the boundaries of the Wrocław diocese. Its name is of Polish origin and comes either from the words strzec ("guard"), strzyc głowy ("cut hair") or trzy góry ("three mountains").

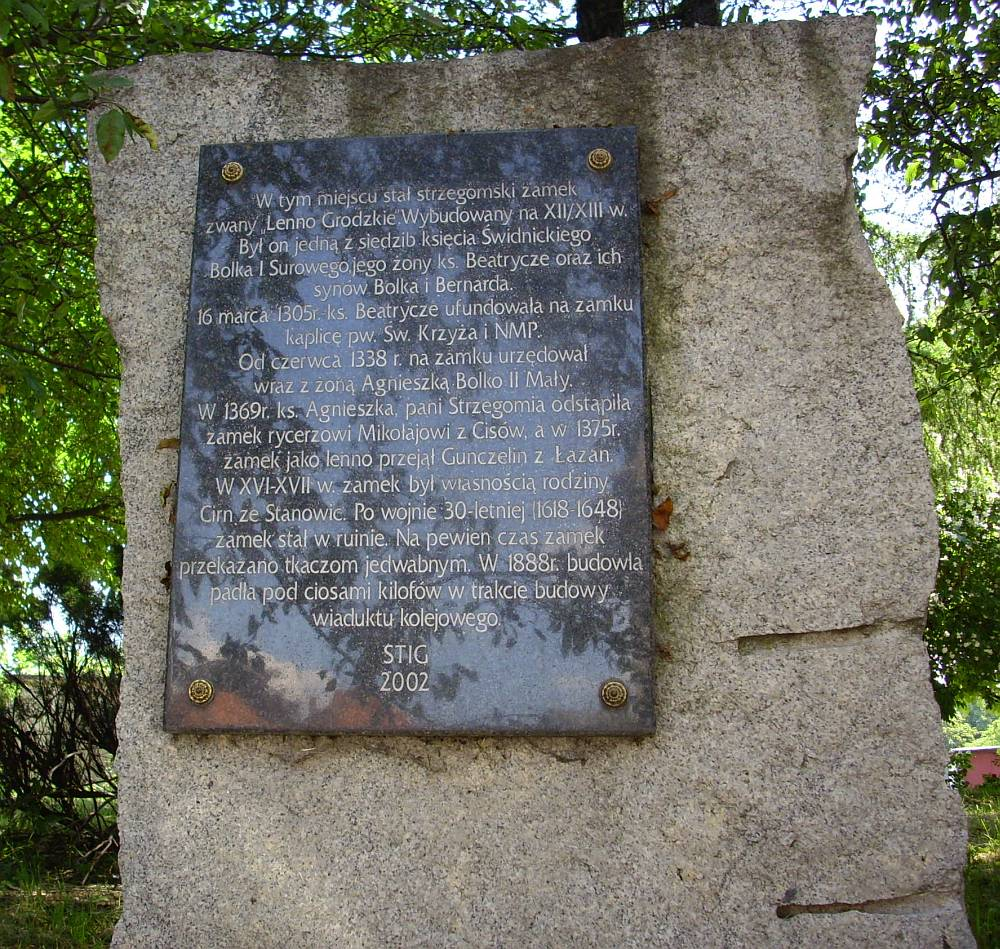
Memorial plaque at the site of the medieval Piast Castle

As a result of the fragmentation of Poland into smaller duchies, Strzegom became part of the Duchy of Silesia in the 12th century. The Piast Castle was built at that time. At the same time the building of the St. Peter and Paul parish church began, from 1203 under the patronage of the Order of Saint John. To help rebuild the devastated region after the first Mongol invasion of Poland (1241), Strzegom town granted town privileges by Anne of Bohemia, widow of Polish monarch Henry II the Pious. In 1248 it passed to the Silesian Duchy of Legnica under Henry's son Bolesław II the Bald, contested by his nephew Henryk IV Probus, who, imprisoned by his uncle at Jelcz, finally had to renounce Strzegom in 1277. Since the 13th century Strzegom was a center of clothmaking. In the 1290s the defensive walls were erected. In 1307 a Benedictine monastery was established. In 1318 a bell was placed in the Church of Saints Peter and Paul, it remains the oldest bell still operating in Poland.

From the late 13th century the town of Strzegom belonged to the Duchy of Jawor and Świdnica under Bolko I the Strict, and until 1392 was ruled by his descendants of the Silesian Piasts. Though they initially withstood the vassalisation attempts by King John of Bohemia, Strzegom subsequently shared the political fortunes of Silesia, and passed from Polish to Bohemian rule, Hungarian in 1469, again Bohemian in 1490, then under the Jagiellonian dynasty until 1526 and within under Austrian Habsburg sovereignty afterwards.

=== Modern era ===
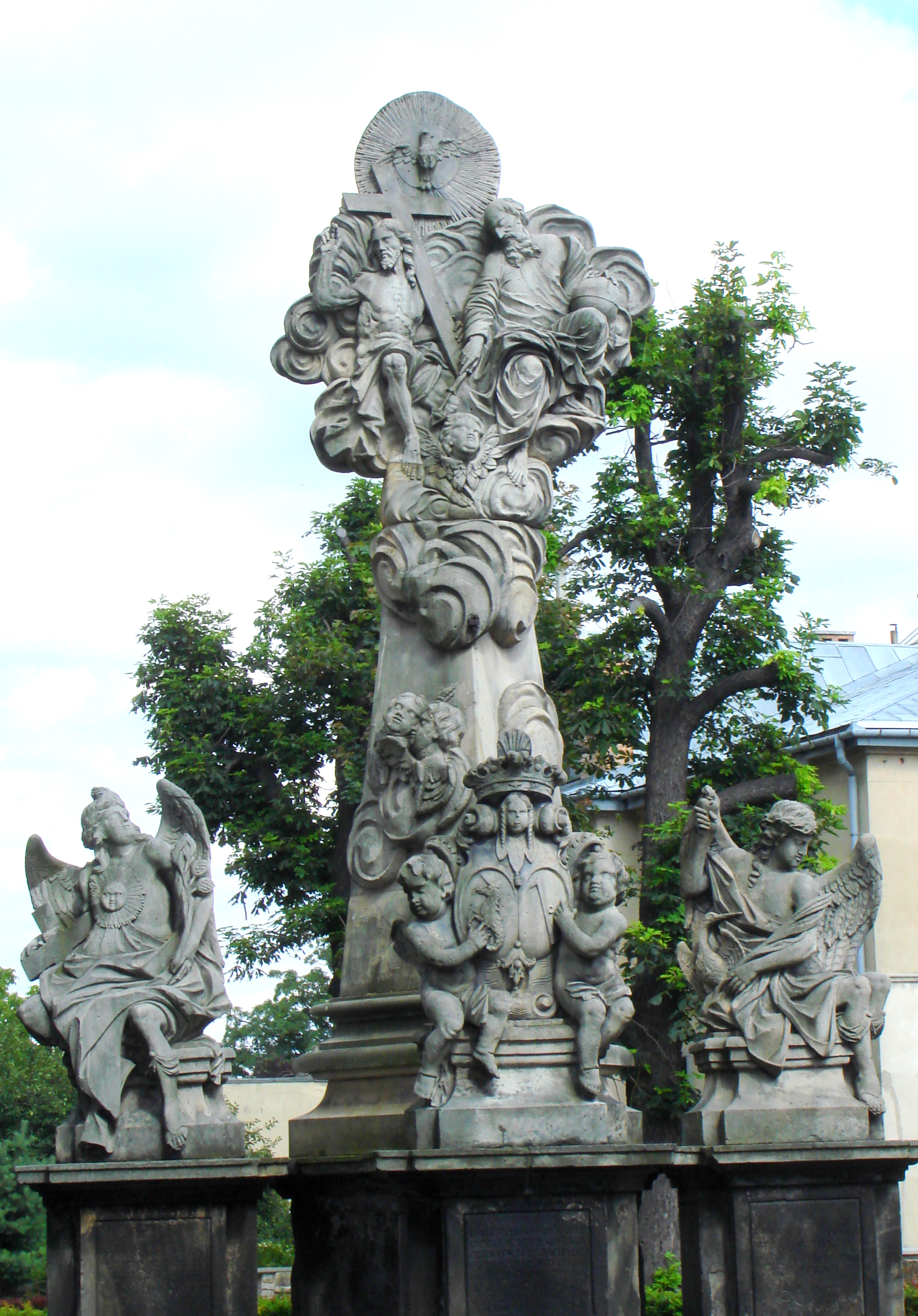
Baroque Holy Trinity statue

During the Thirty Years' War the city suffered almost complete destruction, also the medieval Piast Castle was ruined, and in 1718 and 1719 fires struck the city.

In 1742 the town, under the Germanized name Striegau, became part of Prussia. On 4 June 1745 the Battle of Hohenfriedberg, an important victory for King Frederick II against joint Austrian-Saxon-Polish forces during the War of the Austrian Succession, took place near the town. During the Seven Years' War, Austrian and Russian troops occupied the city from 1760 to 1762, causing great suffering to the civilian population. During the Napoleonic Wars and Polish national liberation fights, Napoleonic troops occupied the town on 23 December 1806. In the ensuing three years, the city was forced to make total contributions of 100,000 talers. Polish troops were stationed in the town in 1807, and later also Prussian and Russian troops. During the German Campaign of 1813, Striegau suffered further financial losses and had to feed 5400 officers and 92,400 soldiers from both the Prussian and the French army.

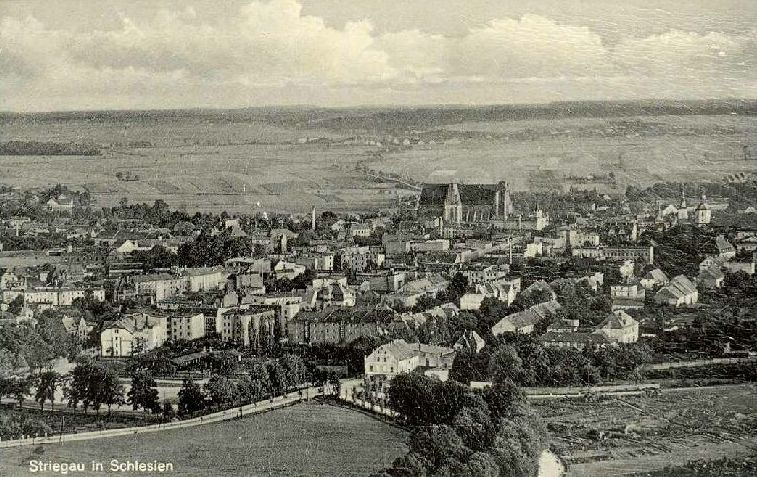
View of the town in the interbellum

The industrialization of Striegau began around 1860. Small factories produced steam boilers, steam engines, and agricultural machines. Five quarries produced granite, which became the most important source of revenue and employment for the city. The first rail link to the town was opened in 1856. In 1861, a gasworks opened. From 1871 the town part of Germany. The remains of the medieval Piast Castle were dismantled in 1888. In 1905 the town of Striegau had 13,427 inhabitants. The majority was Lutheran, with 4,783 Catholics and 100 Jews. By 1939, the population increased to 15,155. Despite Germanisation policies, the Polish newspaper Dla Wszystkich was published in the town from 1901 to 1918. During World War I, the German administration operated a forced labour camp for Allied prisoners of war at a local quarry. After the war ended in 1918, the Treaty of Versailles left the town within Germany. The economic crisis of the following years has led to an increase in unemployment, inflation, poverty and crime.

=== World War II ===
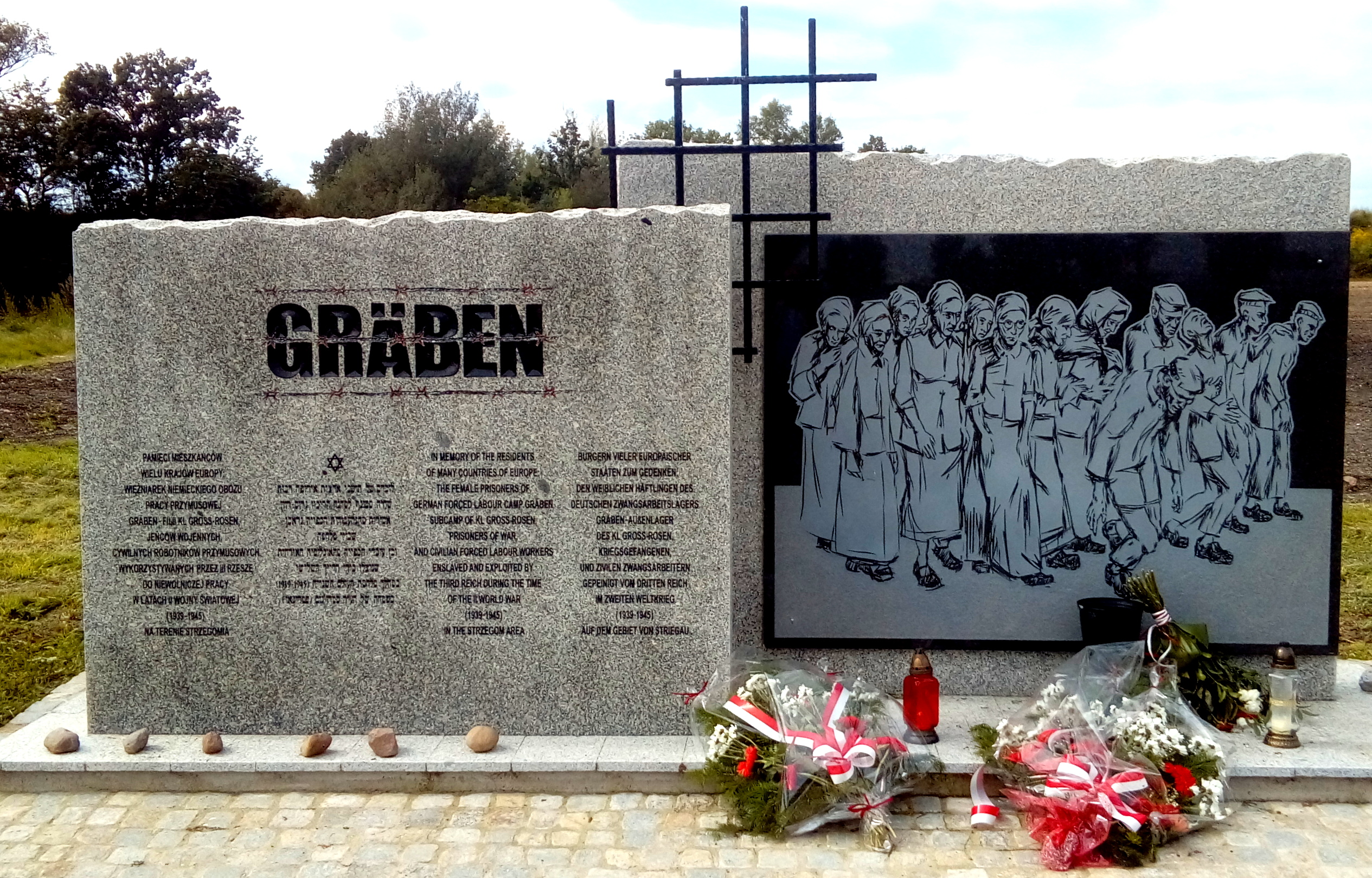
Memorial to the victims of the local subcamp of the Gross-Rosen concentration camp

German troops stationed in the town took part in the invasion of Poland, which started World War II in 1939. During the war, Nazi Germany used an area close to the town as a subcamp of the nearby Gross-Rosen concentration camp. The Germans also established four labour units of the Stalag VIII-A prisoner-of-war camp. The Wehrmacht recaptured the city on 11 March. The official German press widely circulated reports of Soviet atrocities in the city. On 7 May, the Red Army captured Striegau a second time.

At the end of June, the Soviets put the city under Polish administration. Its historic Polish name Strzegom was restored. As a result of the Potsdam Conference in 1945, Strzegom became again a part of Poland, and its German inhabitants were expelled in accordance to the Potsdam Agreement. The town was repopulated with Poles, who in turn were expelled from former eastern Poland annexed by the Soviet Union as a result of the Molotov–Ribbentrop Pact in 1939.

=== Post-war period ===
In 1945, a still operating agricultural machinery factory was launched, and in 1946 also a shoe factory was founded, it was closed in the 1990s. In 1962, the Culture Center was founded, and in 1997 a monument to Pope John Paul II was unveiled.

In 2012 the Jewish Cemetery of Strzegom was fully restored and renovated. Over 80 gravestones (Matzevahs) were repaired and returned to their original place. The project was jointly funded by Poland and the European Union, simultaneously introducing Jewish culture and history to the local townspeople.

== Demography ==
=== Population ===
In 2019, Strzegom had a population of 15,508, with a further 9,457 people living in other villages within Gmina Strzegom. In that year, 206 people were born in the commune and 334 died. In 2014, the age group with the highest population in Strzegom was 55 to 59 year-olds.

=== Migration ===
According to local statistics, 1329 people migrated to Strzegom in 2018. 545 people applied for permanent residence, whilst a further 784 applied for temporary residence.

== Transport ==
There have been three major railway stations in Strzegom:

- Strzegom Town – a station located in the centre of Strzegom. The station building was built in 1890. Since 1996, the station has not been operational, the station building remains closed, and the ticket offices have been liquidated. The roof over the platform has been preserved.
- Strzegom – Located on the outskirts of the town in the north-east. It was put into service in 1856. The Katowice-Legnica line (on which Lower Silesian Railways trains run on the Legnica – Kłodzko Miasto route) and Malczyce-Marciszów lines pass through the station. The station is also used for large cargo trains transporting supplies such as granite and coal to other locations in Poland. The train line from Strzegom also connects to Jaworzyna Śląska, a key transport hub which links to Wrocław and Wałbrzych. It is still used to this day.
- Strzegom Graby – Located in the south-west of the town and serving the suburb of Graby, Strzegom Graby station was liquidated along with the rest of the Strzegom-Rostoki train line in 1996. The station building remains, although it is currently in ruins.

== Sights ==
The Gothic Saints Peter and Paul Basilica is one of Poland's official national Historic Monuments (Pomnik historii), as designated 22 October 2012. Its listing is maintained by the National Heritage Board of Poland.

Cross Mountain (Góra Krzyżowa) is a popular hiking spot located north-west of Strzegom, with a view of the town and the surrounding mountains and valleys. Other historic sights include churches, townhouses, medieval town walls with towers, and other historic buildings and structures.

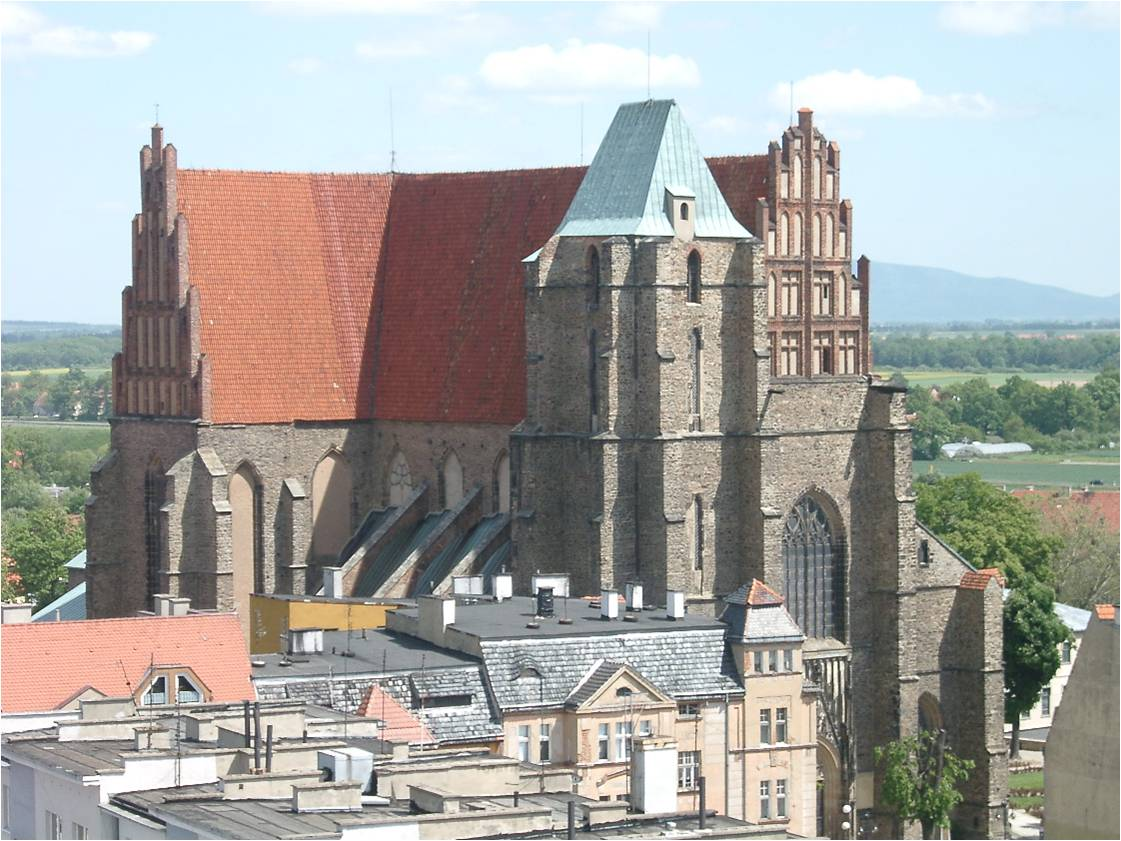
Saints Peter and Paul Basilica

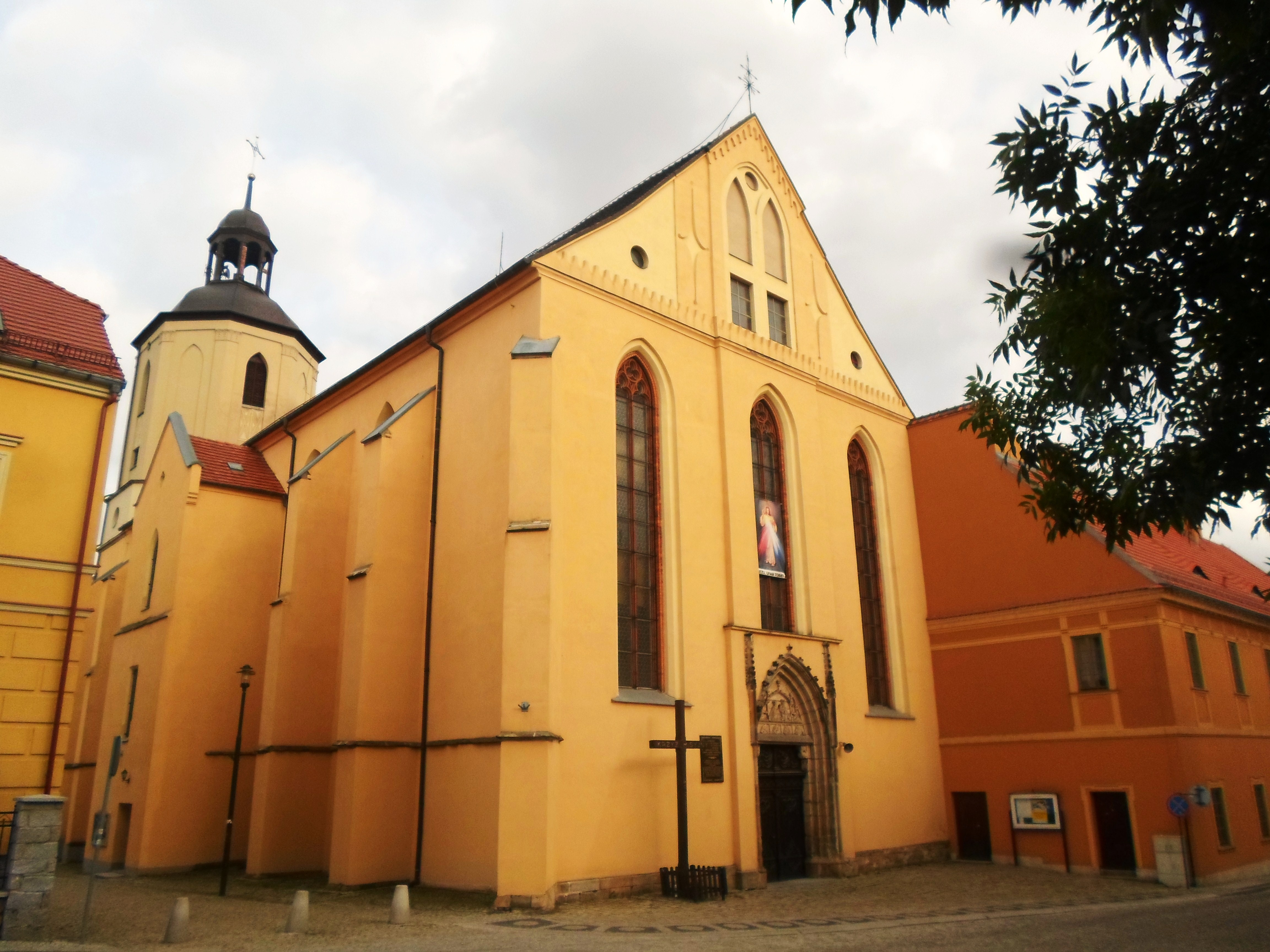
Baroque Salvator Church

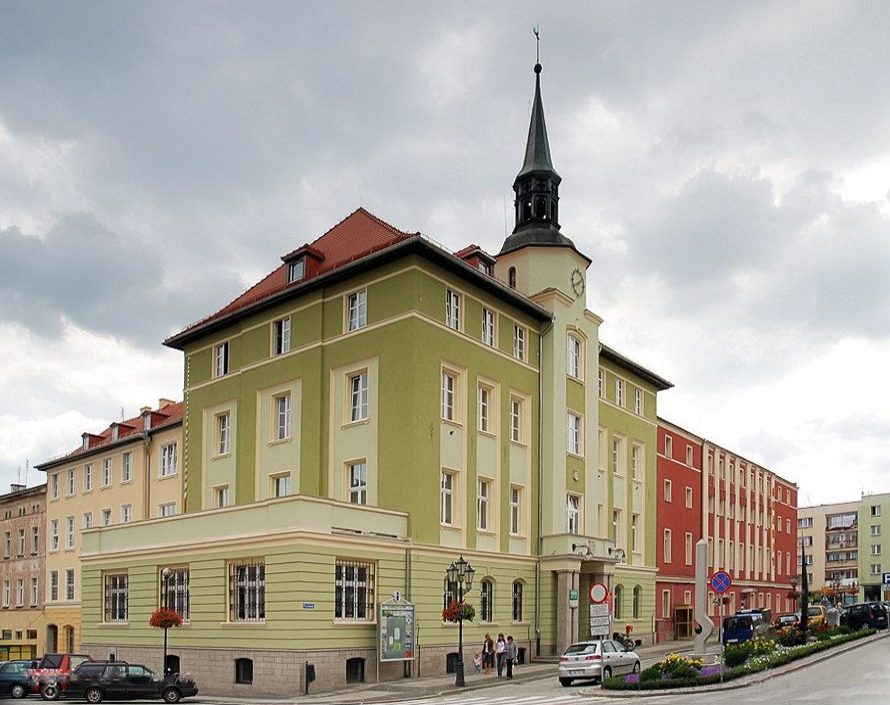
Town Hall

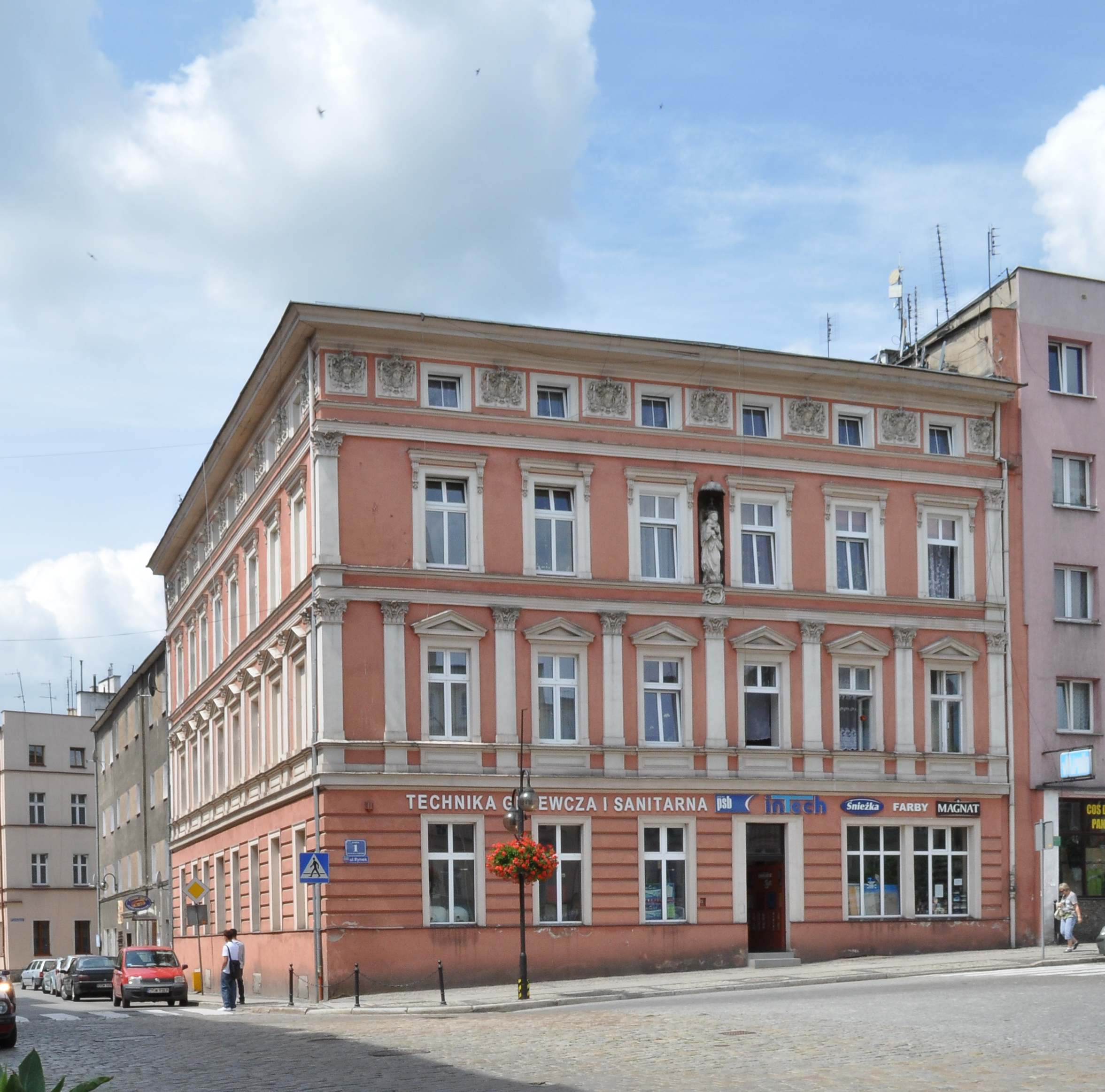
Typical preserved townhouse at the Market Square

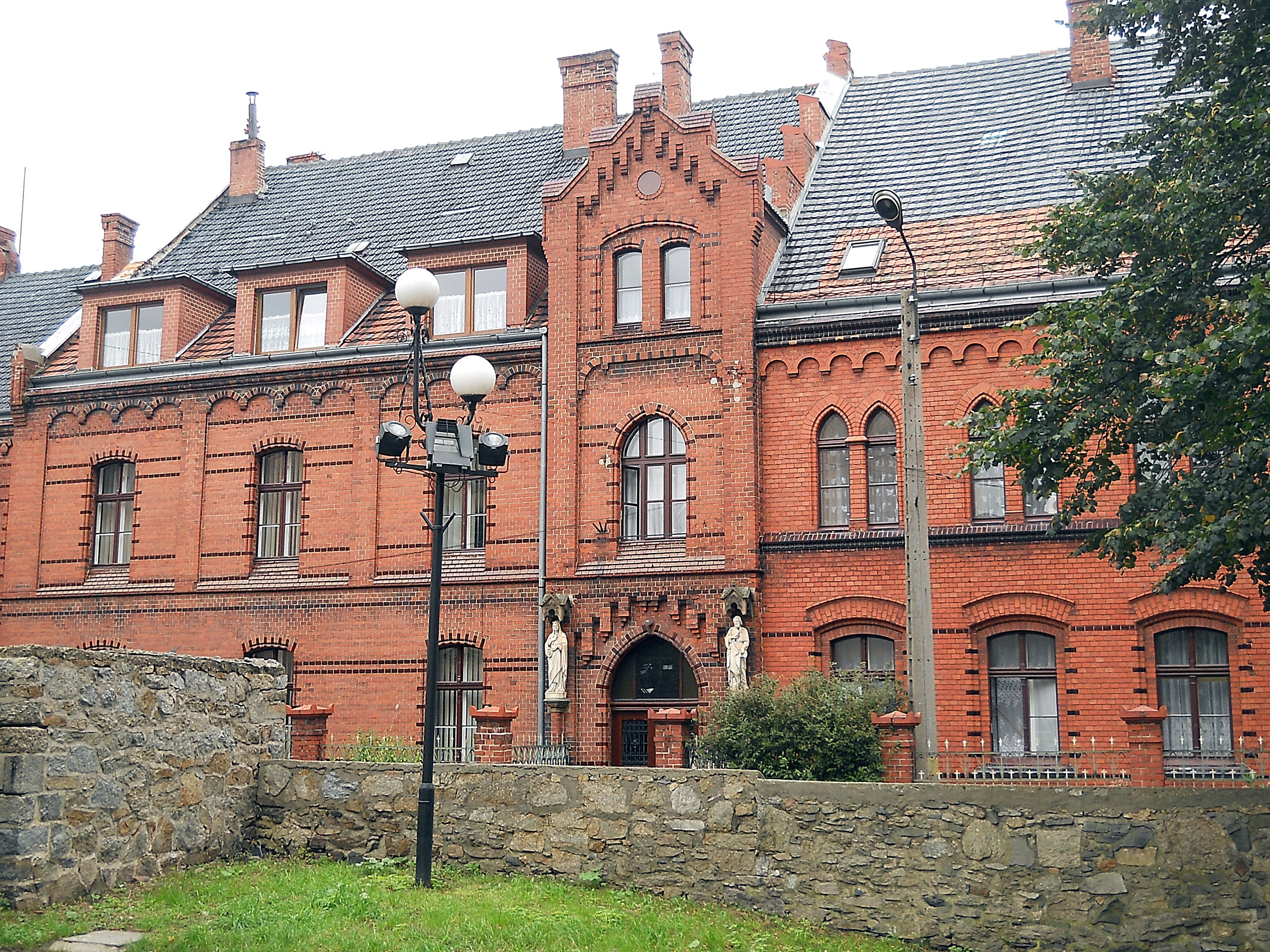
Monastery of the Sisters of Saint Elizabeth

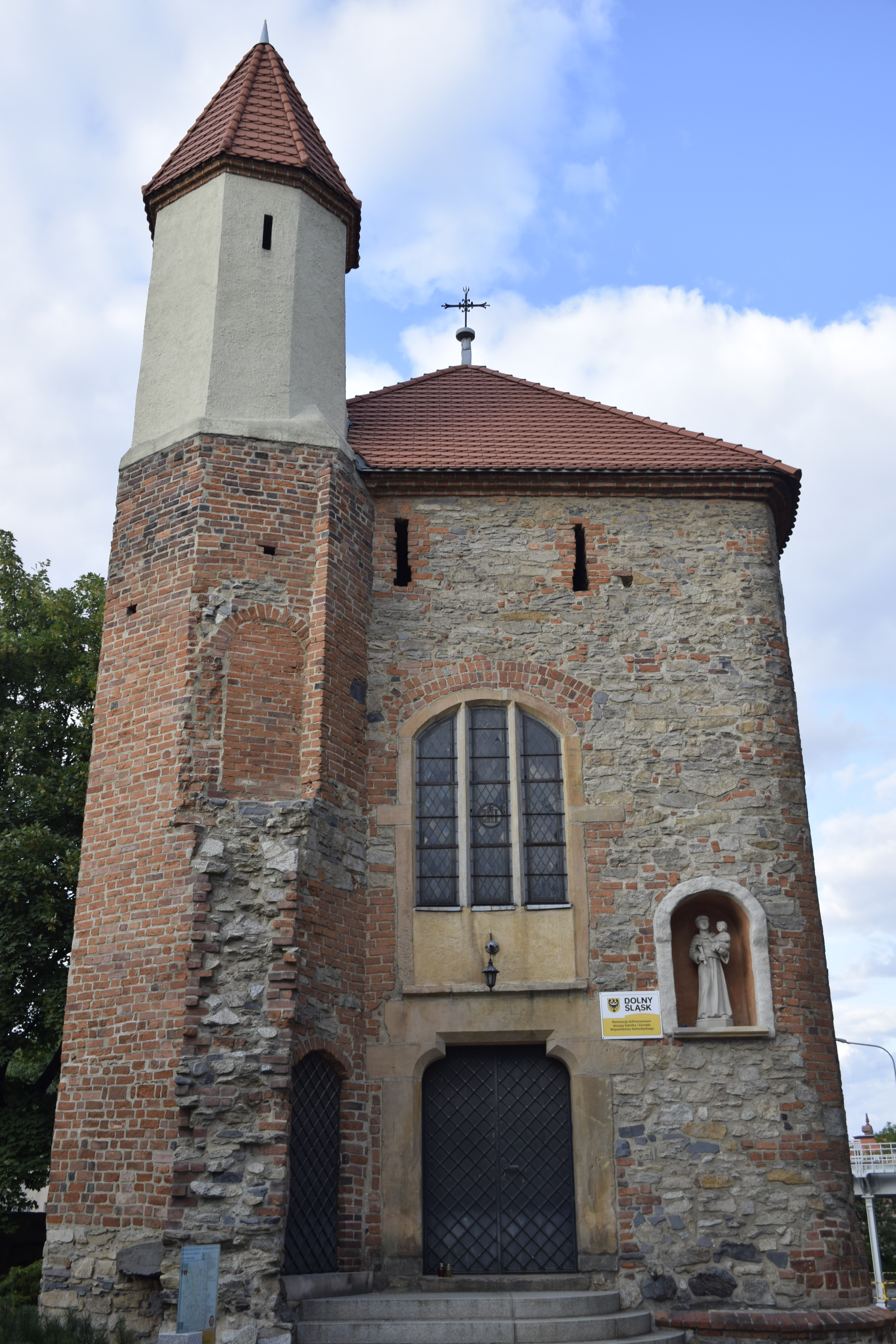
Saint Anthony chapel

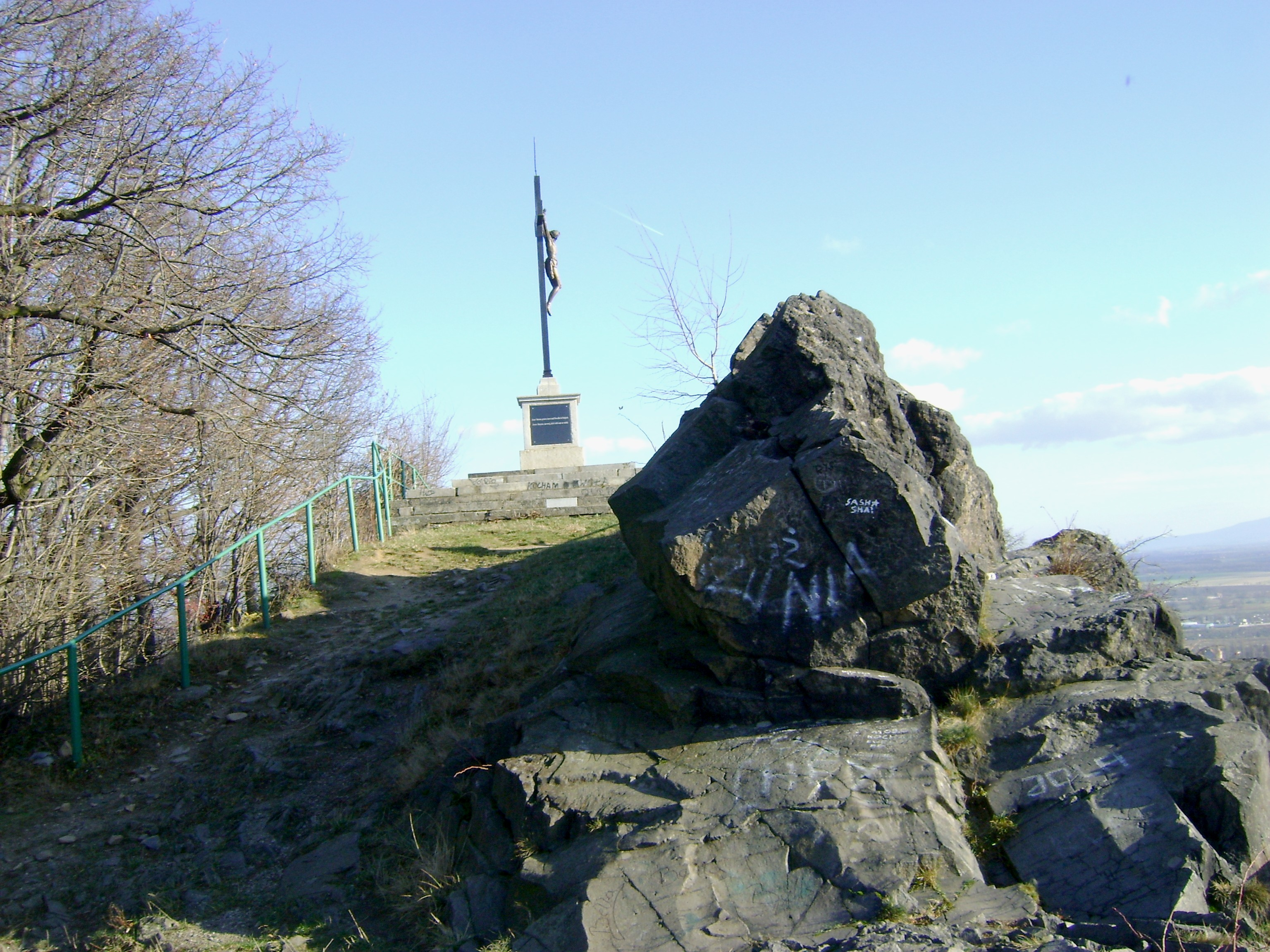
Cross Mountain

== Notable people ==
- Othmar Daniel Zinke (1664–1738), Benedictine abbot
- Johann Christian Günther (1695–1723), Baroque poet
- Otto Beständig (1835–1917), composer, conductor, organist and pianist
- Raffael Schuster-Woldan (1870–1951), painter and professor at the Prussian Academy of Fine Arts
- Peter Zvi Malkin (1927–2005), Mossad agent who arrested Adolf Eichmann
- Hans-Georg Koitz (born 1935), Roman Catholic bishop of Hildesheim (1992–2010)
- Herbert Obst (born 1936), Olympic fencer
- Krzysztof Szwagrzyk (born 1964), Polish historian and publicist
- Andrzej Stelmach (born 1972), Polish former Olympic volleyball player
- Paul Slowinski (born 1980), Polish-Australian kickboxer

== Twin towns – sister cities ==
See twin towns of Gmina Strzegom.
