= Hrabi Cabaret =

One of the well-known Polish cabarets

- Kabaret Hrabi
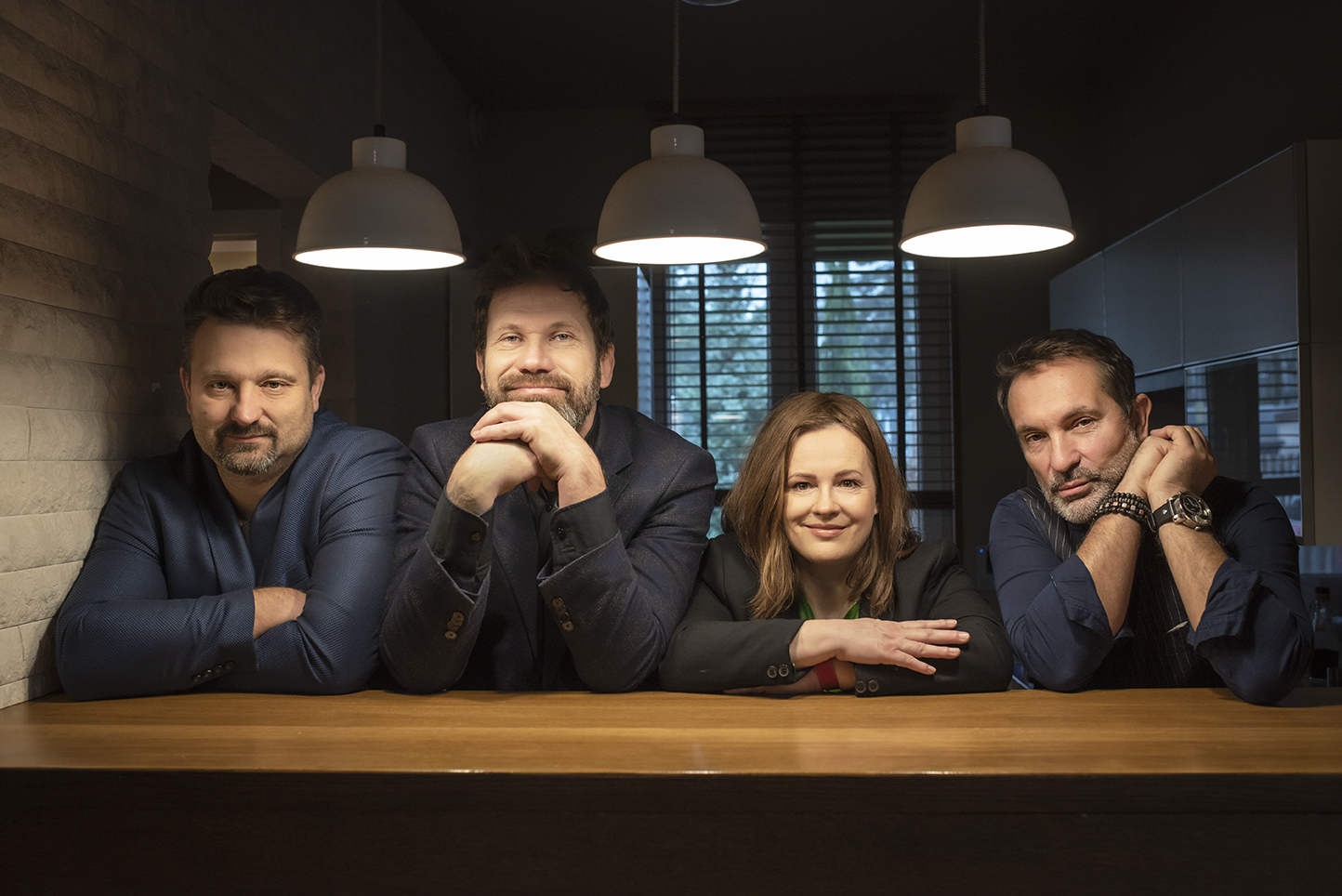
- Hrabi in 2020, from the left: Pietsch. Majer, Kołaczkowska, Kamys
- Formation: 2002
- Type: Theatre group
- Purpose: cabaret
- Location: Poland
- Members: Dariusz Kamys (2002–); Łukasz Pietsch (2002–); Tomasz Majer (2002–); Joanna Kołaczkowska (2002–2025); Krzysztof Szubzda (2002–2003)
- Website: https://hrabi.pl/

The Hrabi Cabaret (Polish: Kabaret Hrabi) is a Polish cabaret group known for its distinctive style of humor and theatrical performances. It was founded in 2002 by Dariusz Kamys and Joanna Kołaczkowska, who were performing before in the highly acclaimed Potem Cabaret.

== History and formation ==
Hrabi was founded in late 2002 by Joanna Kołaczkowska and Dariusz Kamys. The two had previously performed in the Potem Cabaret. The Potem faded out of regular activity around 1999–2000. In the meantime, Kołaczkowska married and had a daughter, Hania (b. 2000). Kamys married Kołaczkowska's older sister, Agnieszka in the late 1980s. The decision to form a new group was driven by Kamys's desire to exploit Kołaczkowska's comedy potential again, as she was focused on family and did not intend to return to cabaret. Kołaczkowska and Kamys were soon joined by Łukasz Pietsch and Krzysztof Szubzda. They debuted in 2002 with their programme "Demo" in the comedy club "U Ojca" in Zielona Góra.

In July 2003, Szubzda decided to leave the cabaret. He was soon replaced by Tomasz Majer, who Kołaczkowska and Kamys have known previously from the student club "Gęba", where Kamys was the manager. They made their first programme together, Terapia (Therapy), which they first performed in December 2003 in Dorożkarnia Cultural Center in Warsaw, where Majer had previously worked. Next year they made a debut with their new programme, Hrabi Dracula (Count Dracula), which they were performing until mid-2006. After long discussions, they made another programme, Pojutrze (Day After Tomorrow), which they performed until 2007. By the time they were finished with Pojutrze, Kołaczkowska suffered a marriage breakup with her then-husband, Krzysztof. The next programme was loosely inspired by Kołaczkowska's love life dilemmas and was titled Kobieta i mężczyzna (Woman and Man). It was from this programme that the sketch "Słaba Płeć" originated from. It received media attention, challenging traditional gender stereotypes in Polish society. In 2008, Kołaczkowska suffered severe spine problems and had to take a break from performing.

In January 2009, Kołaczkowska underwent heart surgery and was forced to undergo a year of rehabilitation. At that time, Hrabi performed only with male members (Kamys, Pietsch and Majer), and the remaining members supported Kołaczkowska financially so that she could survive without a source of income. During this period, Hrabi undertook to stage another program, this time thanks to a proposal from comedian Władek Sikora. The program was titled Syf i Malaria (Filth and Malaria) and debuted on January 7, 2009, at the Świt Cultural Center in Warsaw. In the same year, Hrabi prepared an additional program with songs collected from all their previous programs, accompanied by a band. Between 2010 and 2024, Hrabi continued to be an influential and beloved group in the Polish cabaret scene, consistently producing new shows and performing widely.

In 2010, they released the program Savoir vivre, followed by several other shows almost every year, including Co jest śmieszne (2011), Gdy powiesz: TAK (2012), Tak, że o and Bez wąsów (2013), Lubię to! (2014), Aktorem w płot (2015), Cyrkuśniki (2016), Wady i waszki (2018), and Ariaci in 2020. That year also marked their adaptation to digital formats with the internet program Z Pawlacza (2020). Recently, in 2023, they premiered Pociechy. Joanna Kołaczkowska, often regarded as the central figure in the group, created memorable songs and sketches and continued her artistic contributions both on stage and in various media projects, including radio and podcasts. The cabaret's work was characterized by sharp humor combined with musicality, solidifying their place as one of the leading Polish cabarets.

In April 2025, Hrabi announced that Kołaczkowska had cancer, and following the announcement they suspended their activities until the end of August 2025, canceling all planned performances and ticket sales. Later on, Hrabi experienced a significant and tragic moment with the death of Kołaczkowska, who died on July 17 after fighting cancer for the last few months. The group and fans expressed deep gratitude and respect for her contributions to Polish cabaret. During this period, archival programs featuring Hrabi and Kołaczkowska were broadcast on Polish TV, celebrating her legacy and the cabaret's distinctive humor and classic style.

== Members of the Hrabi cabaret ==
=== Current members ===
- Dariusz Kamys ("Kamol") (b. 1963) – founder, actor, comedian
- Łukasz Pietsch ("Lopez") (b. 1977) – pianist and actor
- Tomasz Majer ("Bajer") (b. 1971) – actor and comedian

=== Former members ===
- Krzysztof Szubzda (b. 1975) – actor, comedian, lawyer, journalist – left in July 2003
- Joanna Kołaczkowska ("Asior") (1966–2025) – founder, actress, singer and comedian – deceased in 2025

== List of programmes ==
=== Performed live ===
- Demo (2002)
- Terapia (2004)
- Hrabi Dracula (2005)
- Pojutrze (2006)
- Kobieta i Mężczyzna (2007)
- Syf i malaria (2009)
- Pienia i jęki (2009)
- Savoir vivre (2010)
- Co jest śmieszne (2011)
- Gdy powiesz: TAK (2012)
- Tak, że o (2013)
- Bez wąsów (children's programme) (2013)
- Lubię to! (2014)
- Aktorem w płot (2015)
- Cyrkuśniki (2016)
- Wady i waszki (2018)
- Ariaci (2020)
- Z Pawlacza (internet programme) (2020)
- Pociechy (2023)

=== Released on DVD ===
- Terapia (January 2007)
- Dracula (May 7, 2008)
- Pojutrze (December 12, 2008)
- Kobieta i Mężczyzna (December 10, 2010)

=== Unreleased ===
- Crime Story (2025)

== Songs ==
Hrabi's performances often include musical elements. As Łukasz Pietsch is a pianist and Kołaczkowska has been widely known on the cabaret scene for her recognizable vocal range, they have made many songs that they have put in their programmes over the years. One of the most known ones are: Song Porzuconej (c. 2007), Krowa (c. 2004), Piosenka ciążowa (c. 2004) and Łysy Pan (c. 2006). They have released an audio CD, Pienia i jęki, on August 1, 2011.
