= Otto Beständig =

German composer, conductor, organist and pianist

Otto Beständig (21 February 1835, Striegau – 26 February 1917, Hamburg) was a German composer, conductor, organist, and pianist.

== Compositions ==
Sacred Oratorios

Salomons Tempelweihe

Der Tod Baldurs

Sonatas

Sonata for Piano, Harmonium, Violin, and Cello (op. 27) 1873

Orchestral Music

Symphony

=== Bibliography ===
- Beständig, Otto. "Beständig, Otto (Musiker, geb. 21.02.1835 Striegau/Schlesien, gest. 26.02.1917 Hamburg)" [Textual record]. Zeitungsausschnittsammlung, Series: Familien- und Personenkunde, File: Familien und Personen, Anfangsbuchstabe B. Hamburg, HH: Staatsarchiv der Freien und Hansestadt Hamburg, University of Hamburg.
