= Raz, Dwa, Trzy =

Polish music band

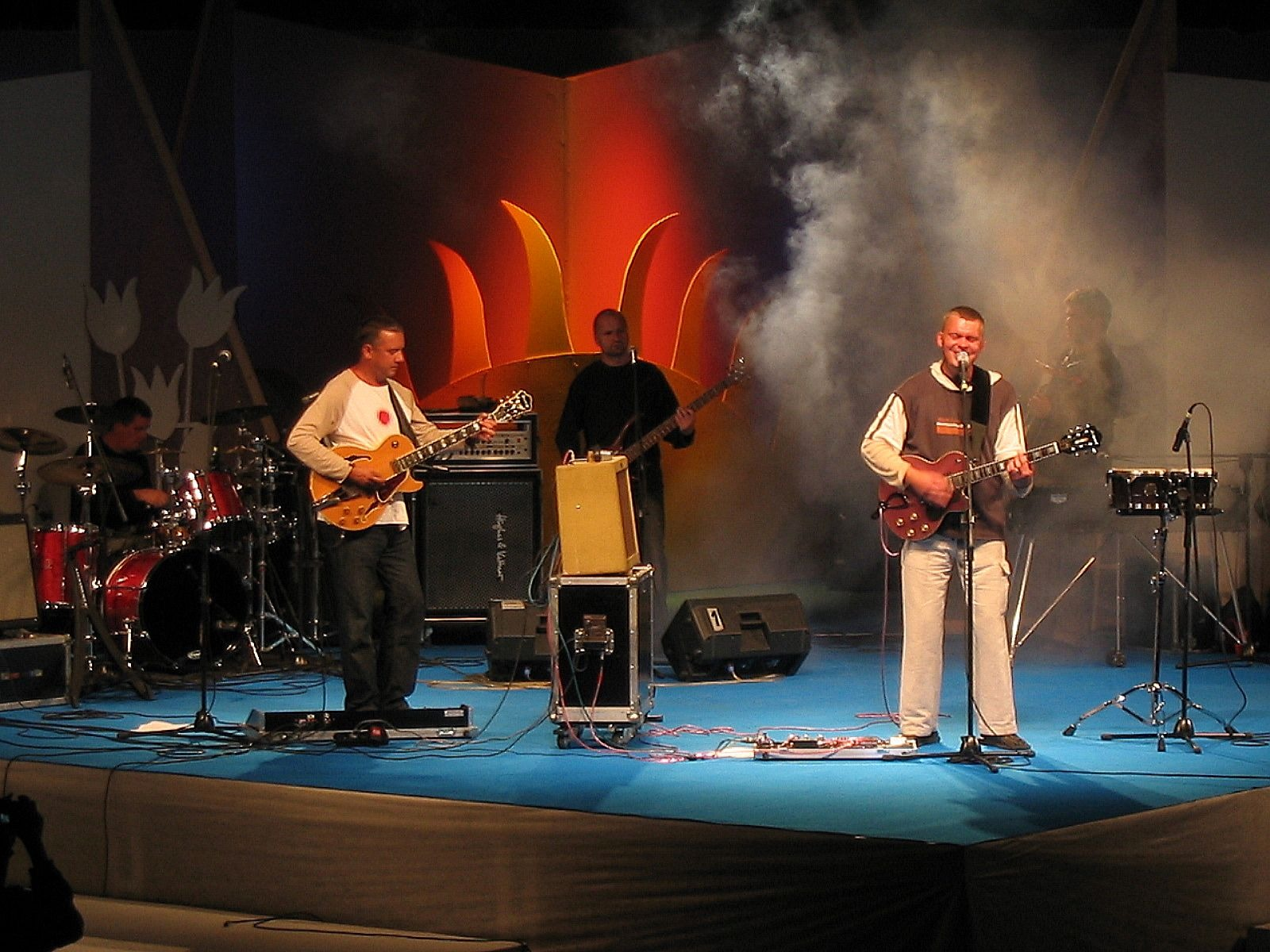
- Raz, Dwa, Trzy live

Background information
- Origin: Zielona Góra, Poland
- Genres: Folk, rock, sung poetry
- Years active: 1990–present
- Labels: Polskie Nagrania Muza, Pomaton, Pomaton EMI, Polskie Radio, Warner Music Poland, 4ever Music
- Members: Adam Nowak; Jacek Olejarz; Grzegorz Szwałek; Jarosław Treliński; Mirosław Kowalik; Tadeusz Kulas
- Website: www.razdwatrzy.zgora.pl

Raz, Dwa, Trzy (Polish for One, Two, Three) is a Polish music band, which joins rock, jazz and folk with contemporary poetry. It was founded in February 1990 by students of the Pedagogical College in Zielona Góra (now University of Zielona Góra). Among founders, there were: Adam Nowak (leader of the band), Grzegorz Szwalek, Jacek Olejarz and Jacek Ograbek.

In the spring of 1990, three months after foundation Raz, Dwa, Trzy won the 26th Student Festival of Music in Kraków. In the course of the time, it has become very popular and now its records are sold in hundreds of thousands.

== Members ==
Currently, the band has five members:

- Adam Nowak – guitar, vocal
- Jacek Olejarz – drums
- Grzegorz Szwałek – accordion, clarinet, keyboard
- Jarosław Treliński – guitar, vocal
- Mirosław Kowalik – double bass, bass, vocal

== Discography ==
=== Studio albums ===
Title	Album details	Peak chart positions	Sales	Certifications
Title	Album details	POL	Sales	Certifications
Jestem Polakiem	Released: 1991; Label: Polskie Nagrania Muza; Formats: CD	—		
To ja	Released: 1992; Label: Pomaton; Formats: CD	—		
Cztery	Released: 1994; Label: Pomaton; Formats: CD	—	POL: 100,000+	POL: Gold
Sufit	Released: 4 March 1996; Label: Pomaton; Formats: CD	—		
Niecud	Released: 14 December 1998; Label: Pomaton EMI; Formats: CD	—		
Trudno nie wierzyć w nic	Released: 31 March 2003; Label: Warner Music Poland; Formats: CD, digital download	2	POL: 70,000+	POL: Platinum
Skądokąd	Released: 1 March 2010; Label: 4ever Music; Formats: CD, digital download	2	POL: 30,000+	POL: Platinum
"—" denotes a recording that did not chart or was not released in that territory.

=== Live albums ===
Title	Album details	Peak chart positions	Sales	Certifications
Title	Album details	POL	Sales	Certifications
Czy te oczy mogą kłamać	Released: 29 July 2002; Label: Polskie Radio; Formats: CD, digital download	3	POL: 70,000+	POL: Platinum
Młynarski	Released: 24 September 2007; Label: 4ever Music; Formats: CD, digital download	1	POL: 60,000+	POL: 2× Platinum
Raz, Dwa, Trzy - Dwadzieścia	Released: 29 November 2010; Label: 4ever Music; Formats: CD, digital download	6	POL: 30,000+	POL: Platinum
"—" denotes a recording that did not chart or was not released in that territory.

=== Compilation albums ===
Title	Album details
Muzyka z talerzyka	Released: 28 February 2000; Label: Pomaton EMI; Formats: CD, digital download

=== Video albums ===
Title	Video details	Sales	Certifications
Przystanek Woodstock 2005	Released: 31 August 2006; Label: Złoty Melon; Formats: DVD		
Raz, Dwa, Trzy - Dwadzieścia	Released: 29 November 2010; Label: 4ever Music; Formats: DVD	POL: 5,000+	POL: Gold
