= Polkowice Dolne =

- Location within Poland
- Coordinates: 51°30′N 16°05′E
- Country: Poland
- Voivodeship: Lower Silesian
- County: Polkowice
- Gmina: Polkowice
- Within town limits: 2005
- Time zone: UTC+1 (CET)
  - Summer (DST): UTC+2 (CEST)
- Postal code: 59-101
- Area code: +48 76
- Car plates: DPL

Polkowice Dolne [pɔlkɔˈvit͡sɛ ˈdɔlnɛ] is a district (osiedle) of the town of Polkowice, in the administrative district of Gmina Polkowice, within Polkowice County, Lower Silesian Voivodeship, in south-western Poland. Formerly a village, it was incorporated within the town limits of Polkowice in 2005.

During World War II, a German forced labour subcamp of the prison in Jawor was operated in the settlement.
