= Sts. Apostles Peter and Paul Basilica (Strzegom) =

- Bazylika Świętych Apostołów Piotra i Pawła
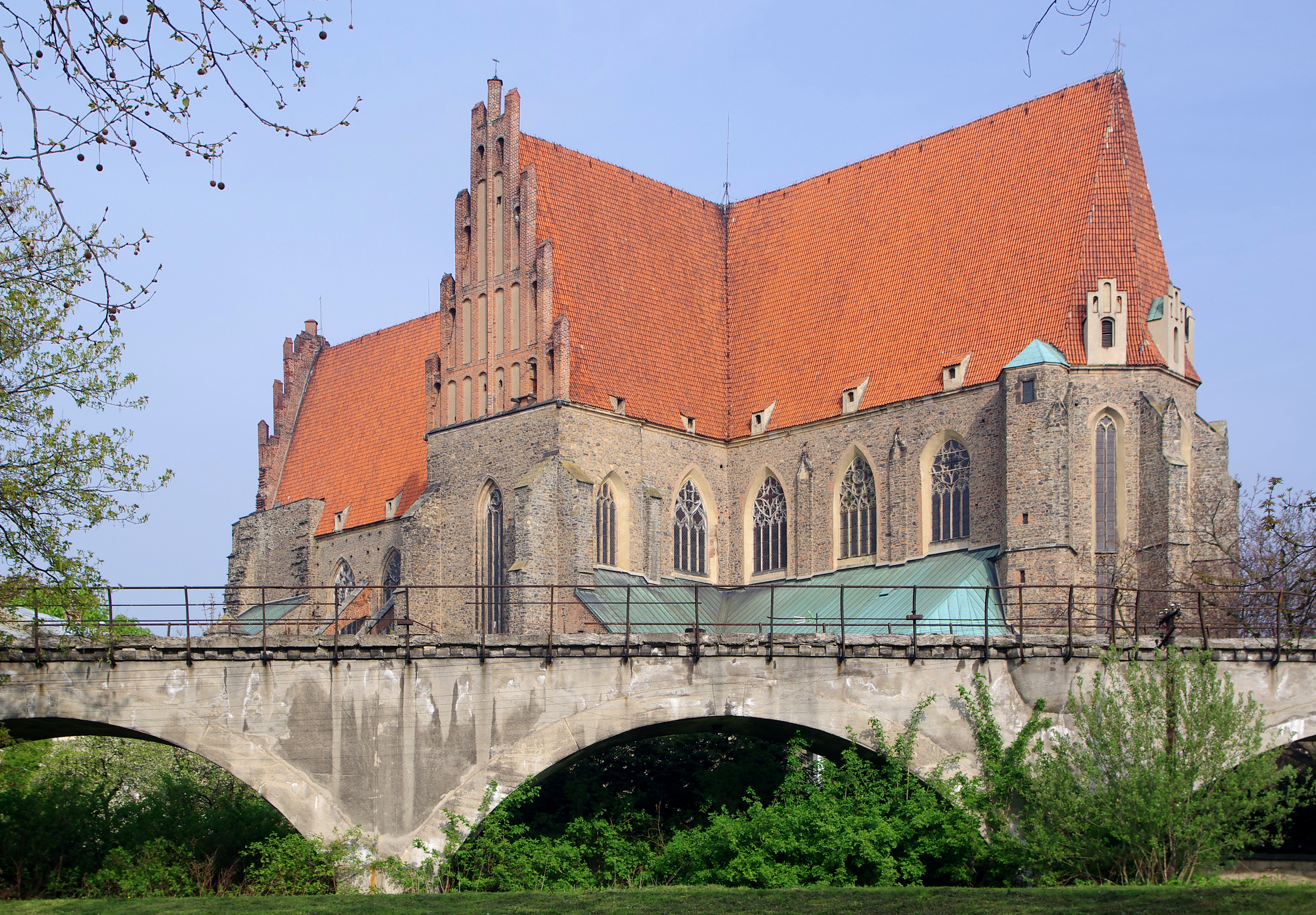
- Saints Peter and Paul Basilica
- Sts. Apostles Peter and Paul Basilica
- 50.5733°N 16.2057°E
- Location: Strzegom
- Country: Poland
- Denomination: Roman Catholic

Architecture
- Style: Gothic
- Groundbreaking: 14th century
- Completed: 16th century

Specifications
- Materials: Brick

Administration
- Archdiocese: Roman Catholic Archdiocese of Wrocław
- Diocese: Roman Catholic Diocese of Świdnica

Historic Monument of Poland
- Designated: 2012-10-22
- Reference no.: Dz. U. z 2012 r. poz. 1241

The Sts. Apostles Peter and Paul Basilica in Strzegom, Poland, is a historic Brick Gothic minor basilica. Strzegom is part of the Diocese of Świdnica.

Formerly, the basilica belonged to the Sovereign Military Order of Malta. Since 2002, the church serves as a minor basilica. It is the most prized heritage site of the town and is one of the largest churches in Lower Silesia with a length of the nave at 76 m, height of 26 m and a main building width of 26 m. It is an example of Lower Silesian Gothic architecture. The church is enriched with artisanal handicraft mainly from the fourteenth and fifteenth-century.

On September 22, 2012 the minor basilica was registered on the List of Historic Monuments of Poland.
