= Adam Nowak =

Polish musician

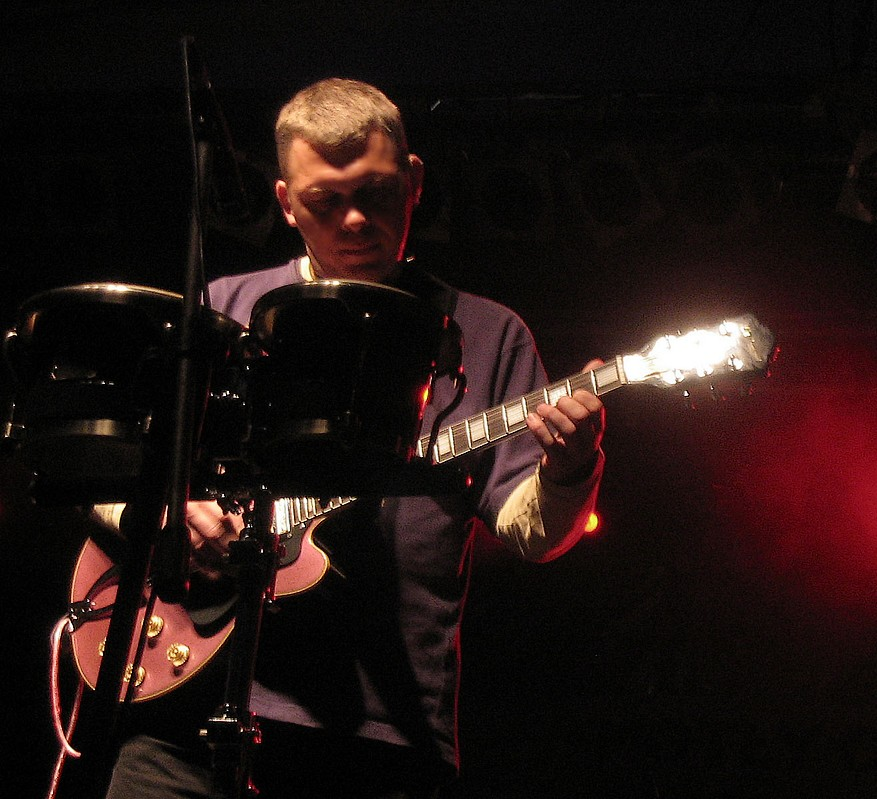
- Born: 28 September 1963 (age 62); Poznań, Poland
- Education: University of Zielona Góra
- Occupation: musician
- Spouse: Dorota Nowak
- Children: Stanisław, Jan, Barbara, Zofia
- Musical career
- Instrument: guitar
- Label: 4ever Music

Adam Nowak (born 28 September 1963 in Poznań) is a leader, guitar player and song writer of the Polish music band Raz, Dwa, Trzy. He is a graduate of Zielona Góra Pedagogical University (now the University of Zielona Góra) and currently lives near Toruń with his family.
