= University of Zielona Góra =

Polish university

Coordinates: 51°56′11″N 15°30′25″E

- Uniwersytet Zielonogórski
- Latin: Universitas Viridimontanensis
- Type: Public
- Established: September 1, 2001
- Rector: prof. dr hab. Wojciech Strzyżewski
- Academic staff: 1005
- Administrative staff: 774
- Students: 8,680 (12.2023)
- Address: 50 Podgórna st., 65-246, Zielona Góra, Poland
- Affiliations: SOCRATES, ERASMUS, EUA
- Website: https://www.uz.zgora.pl/

University rankings

Regional – Overall
- QS Emerging Europe and Central Asia: 201-210 (2022)

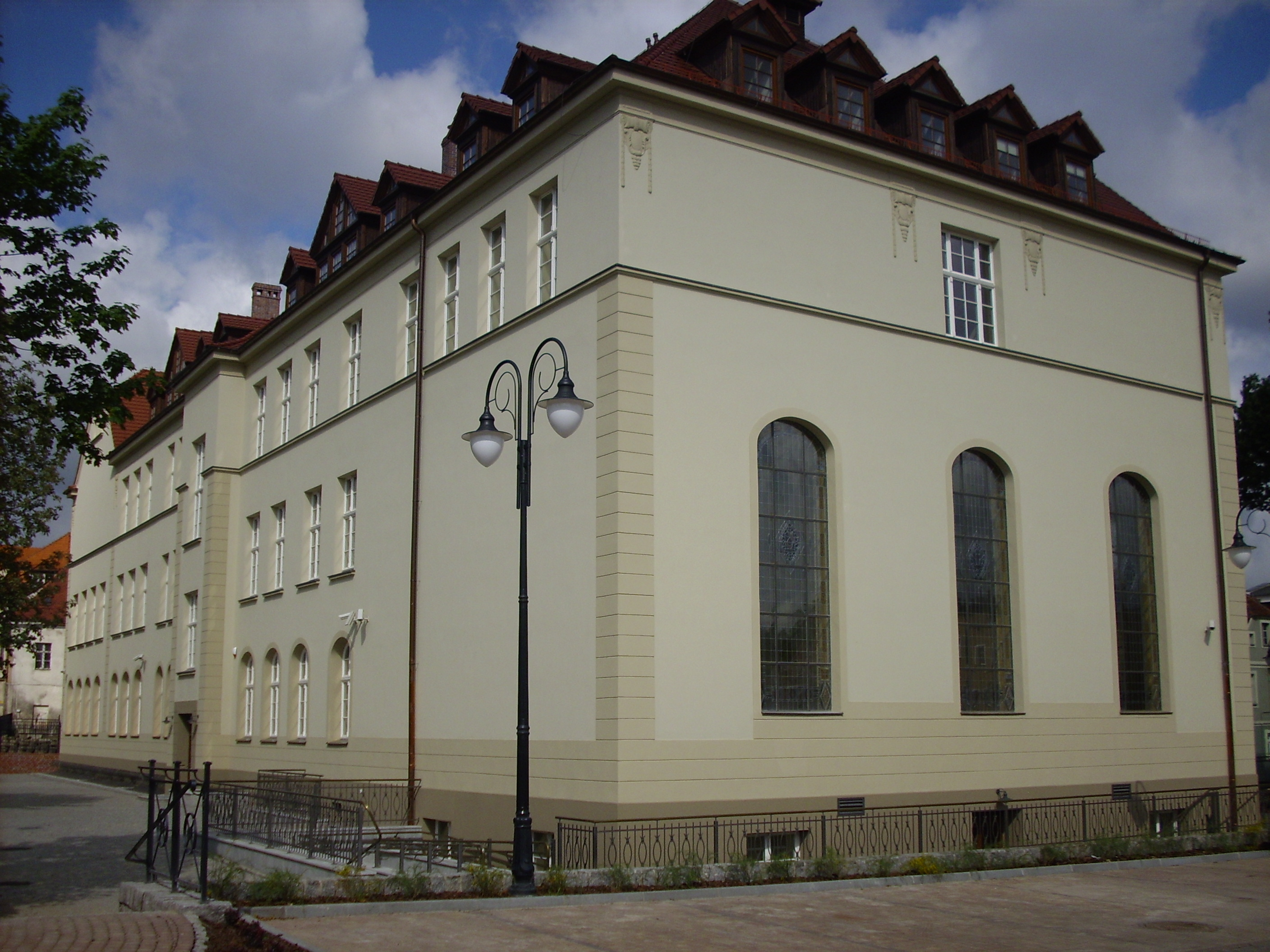
Rector's Office

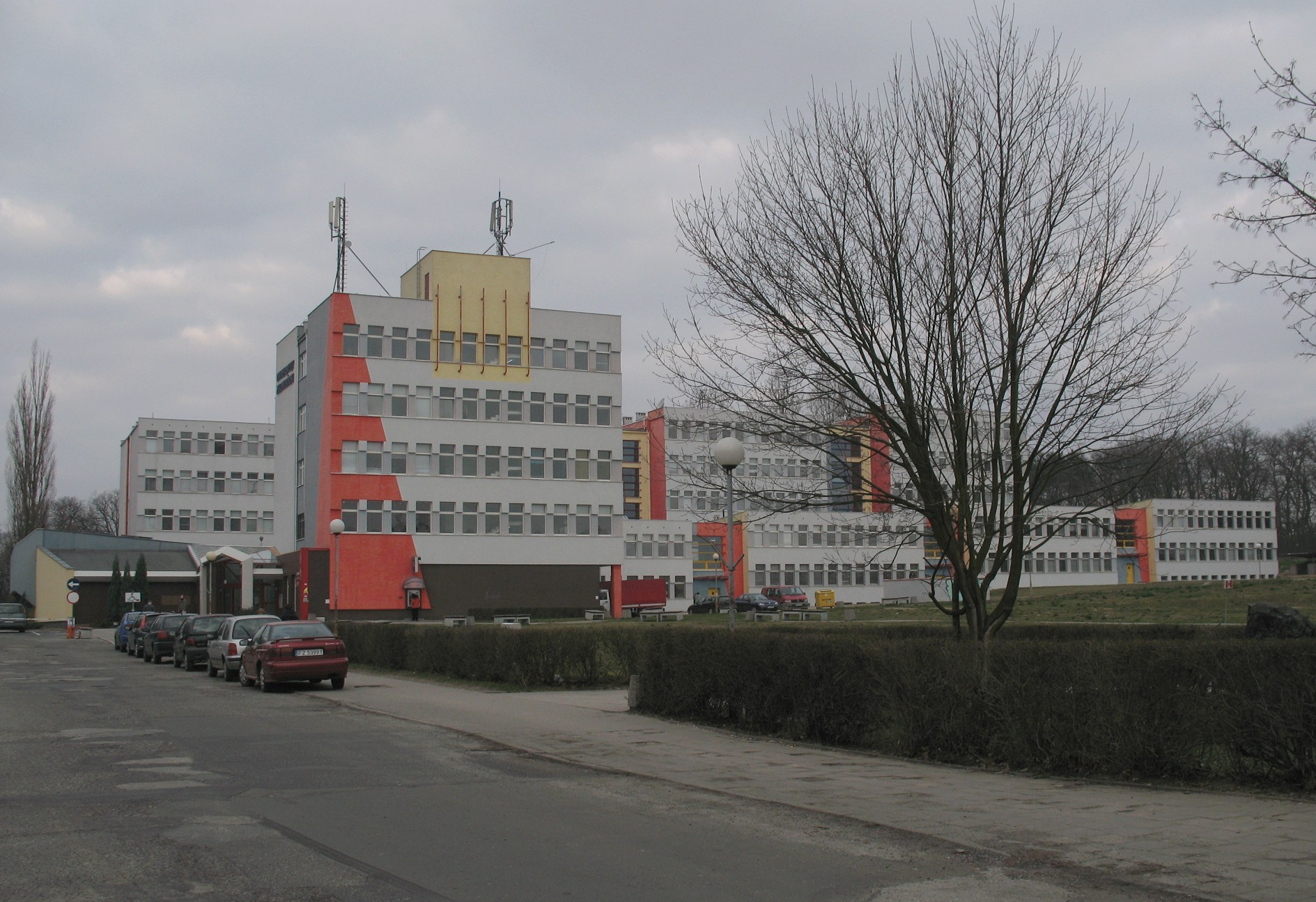
Campus B building

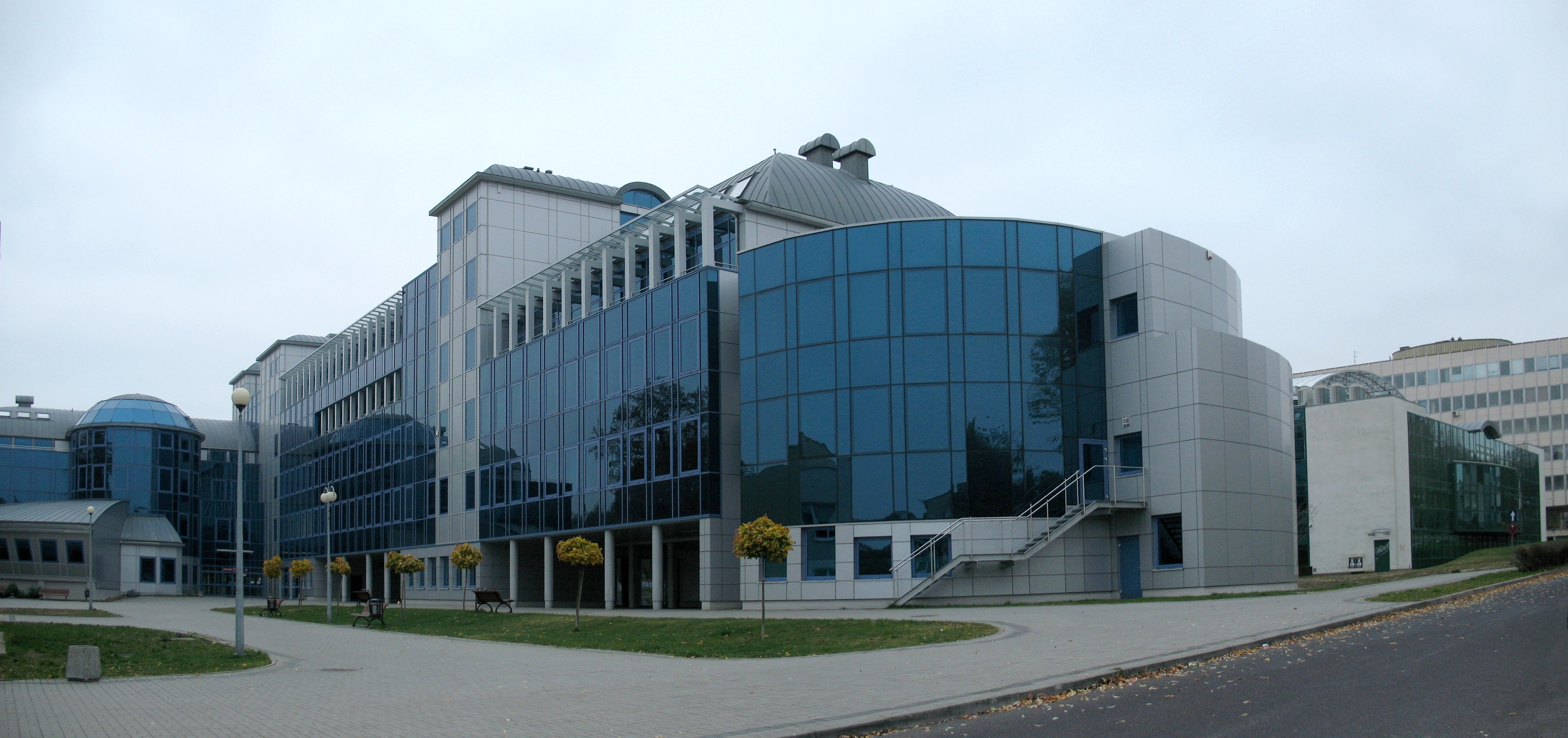
Campus A building

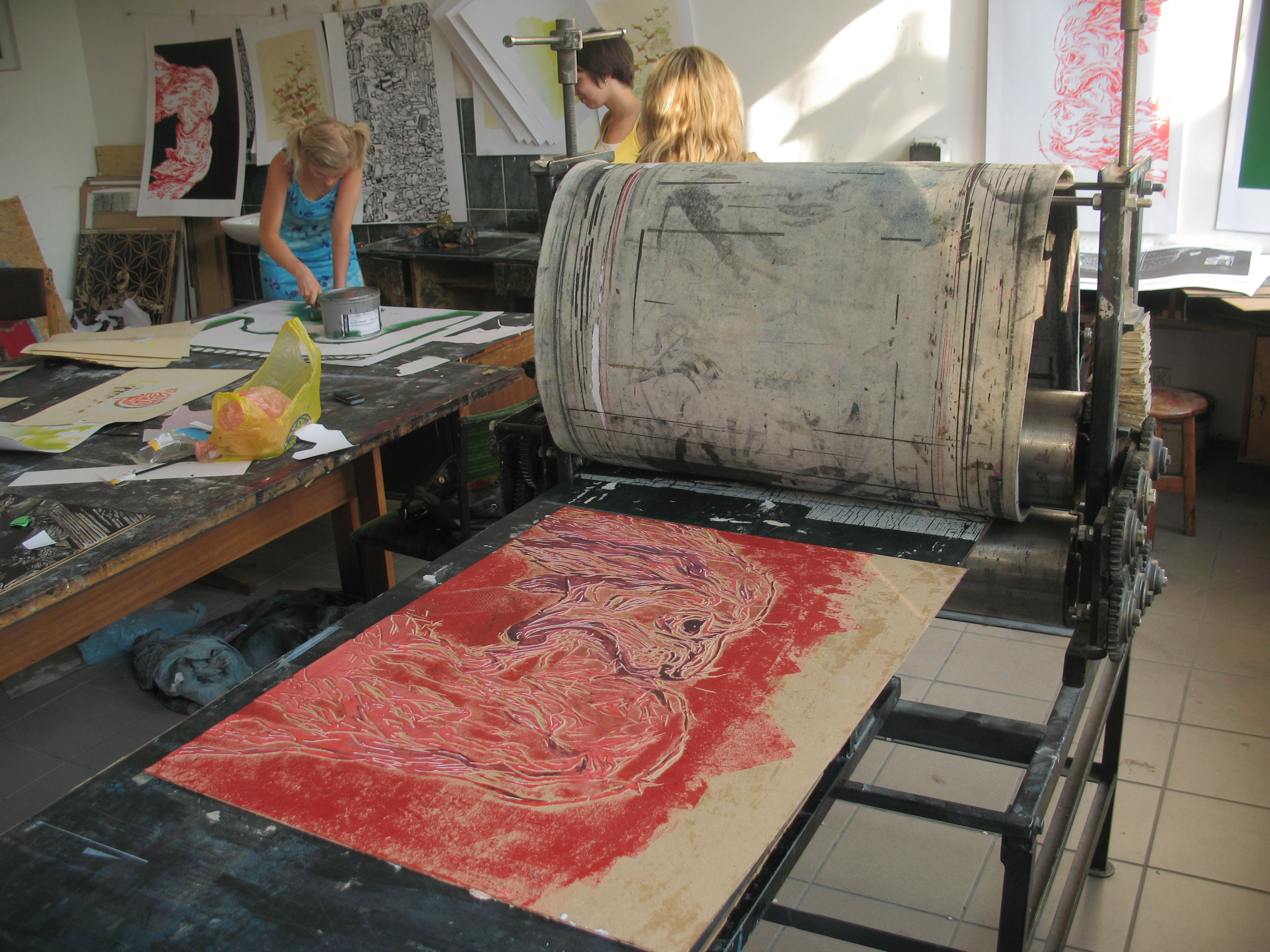
Graphic Workshop at the Art Department

The University of Zielona Góra was founded on 1 September 2001 as a result of a merger between Zielona Góra's Pedagogical University, which was founded in 1971 and Technical University, which was founded in 1965. It is one of the newer universities in Poland. Main buildings are located in two campuses: "A" on Podgórna street and "B" on Wojska Polskiego street. The President's office is located near the Old Town on Licealna Street.

== Faculties ==
The University of Zielona Góra consists of 7 faculties:

- Collegium Medicum — Faculty of Medicine and Health Sciences
- Faculty of Arts
- Faculty of Humanities
- Faculty of Exact and Natural Sciences
- Faculty of Engineering and Technical Sciences
- Faculty of Social Sciences
- Faculty of Legal and Economical Sciences
