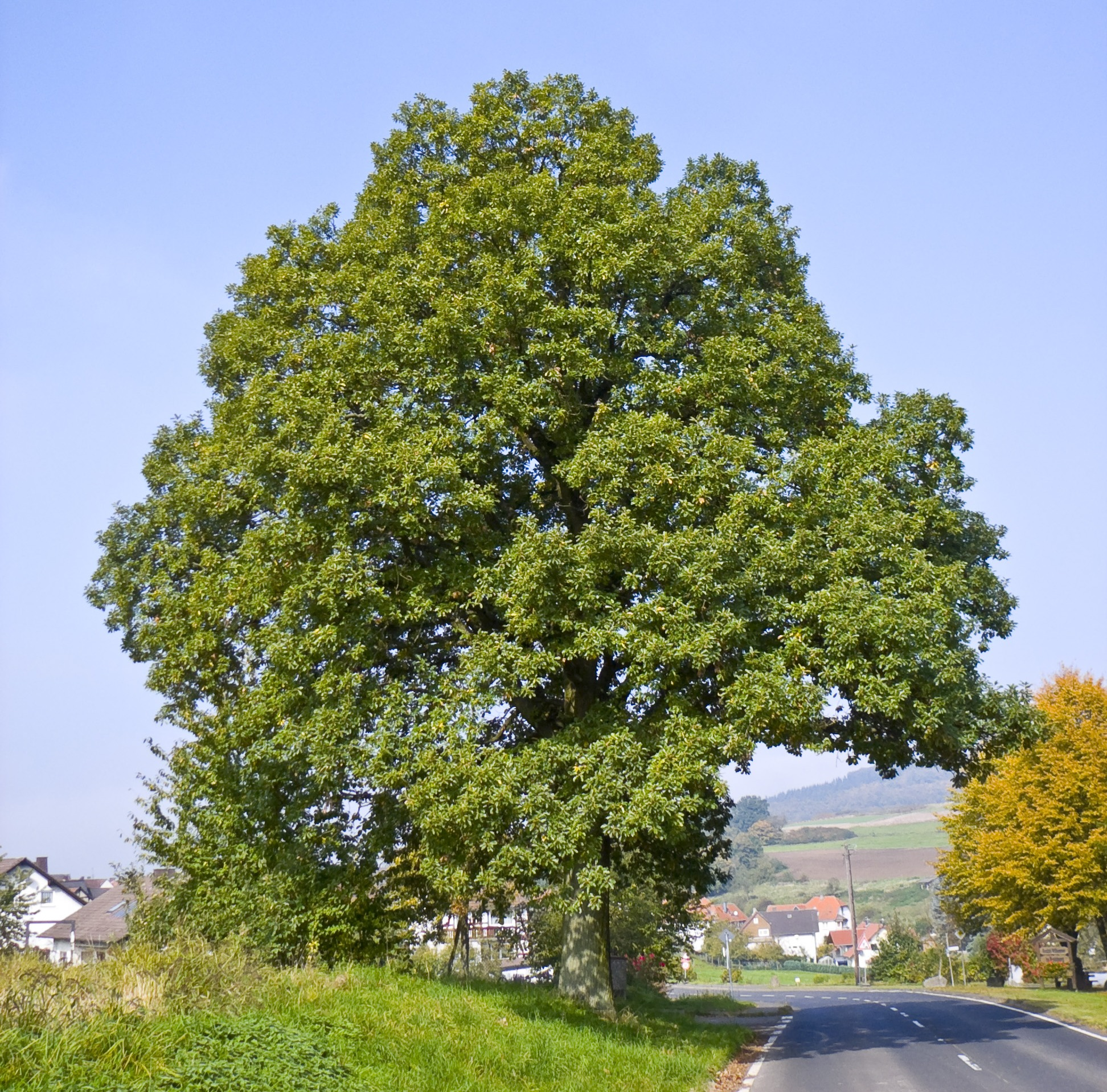
- A mature tree in Hesse, Germany

Conservation status
- Least Concern (IUCN 3.1)

Scientific classification
- Kingdom: Plantae
- Clade: Tracheophytes
- Clade: Angiosperms
- Clade: Eudicots
- Clade: Rosids
- Order: Fagales
- Family: Fagaceae
- Genus: Quercus
- Subgenus: Quercus subg. Quercus
- Section: Quercus sect. Quercus
- Species: Q. petraea

Binomial name
- Quercus petraea (Matt.) Liebl.

Subspecies
- See text.
- Distribution map

Synonyms
- List: Quercus robur var. petraea Matt.; Quercus brevipedunculata Cariot & St.-Lag.; Quercus calcarea Troitsky; Quercus columbaria Vuk.; Quercus coriacea Bechst.; Quercus coronensis Schur; Quercus decipiens Behlen; Quercus dispar Raf.; Quercus durinus Raf.; Quercus erythroneura Vuk.; Quercus esculus L.; Quercus longipetiolata Schur; Quercus mas Thore; Quercus mespilifolia Wallr.; Quercus peraffinis Gand.; Quercus petiolata Schur; Quercus regalis Burnett ex Endl.; Quercus sessiliflora Salisb.; Quercus sessilis Ehrh. ex Schur; Quercus spathulifolia Vuk.; Quercus sphaerocarpa Vuk.; Quercus sublobata Kit.; Quercus huguetiana (Franco & G.López) Rivas Mart.; Quercus colchica Czeczott; Quercus dshorochensis K.Koch; Quercus hypochrysa Steven; Quercus iberica Steven ex M.Bieb.; Quercus kochiana O.Schwarz; Quercus kozlowskyi Woronow ex Grossh.; Quercus lamprophyllos K.Koch; Quercus polycarpa Schur; Quercus sorocarpa Woronow ex Maleev; Quercus szowitzii Wenz.; Quercus abietum Kotschy ex A.DC.; Quercus cedrorum Kotschy; Quercus ibicis Kotschy ex A.DC.; Quercus pinnatiloba K.Koch; Quercus subalpina Kotschy ex A.DC.; Quercus tergestina Wenz.; plus a long list of invalid names and another long list of names below the species level

= Quercus petraea =

Species of flowering plant

Quercus petraea, commonly known as the sessile oak, Welsh oak, Cornish oak, Irish oak or durmast oak, is a species of deciduous oak tree in the flowering plant family Fagaceae. It is native to most of Europe and into Anatolia and Iran. The sessile oak is the national tree of Ireland, and an unofficial emblem in Wales and Cornwall.

Sessile oak is a significant source of Timber in Europe, and historically was important in ship construction. Most trees reach a height of 20-40 m, and can live for several centuries.

== Description ==
The sessile oak is a large deciduous tree up to 40 metres (130 feet) tall, in the white oak section of the genus (Quercus sect. Quercus) and similar to the pedunculate oak (Q. robur), with which it overlaps extensively in range. The leaves are 7–14 centimetres (2 3/4–5 1/2 inches) long and 4–8 cm (1 1/2–3 in) broad, evenly lobed with five to six lobes on each side and a 1 cm-long (1/2 in) petiole. Sessile oak is monoecious, with both male and female flowers found on the same tree. The female flowers are found on bracts. The male flowers are grouped into catkins, produced in the spring. The fruit is an acorn 2–3 cm (3/4–1 1/4 in) long and 1–2 cm (1/2–3/4 in) broad, which matures in about six months.

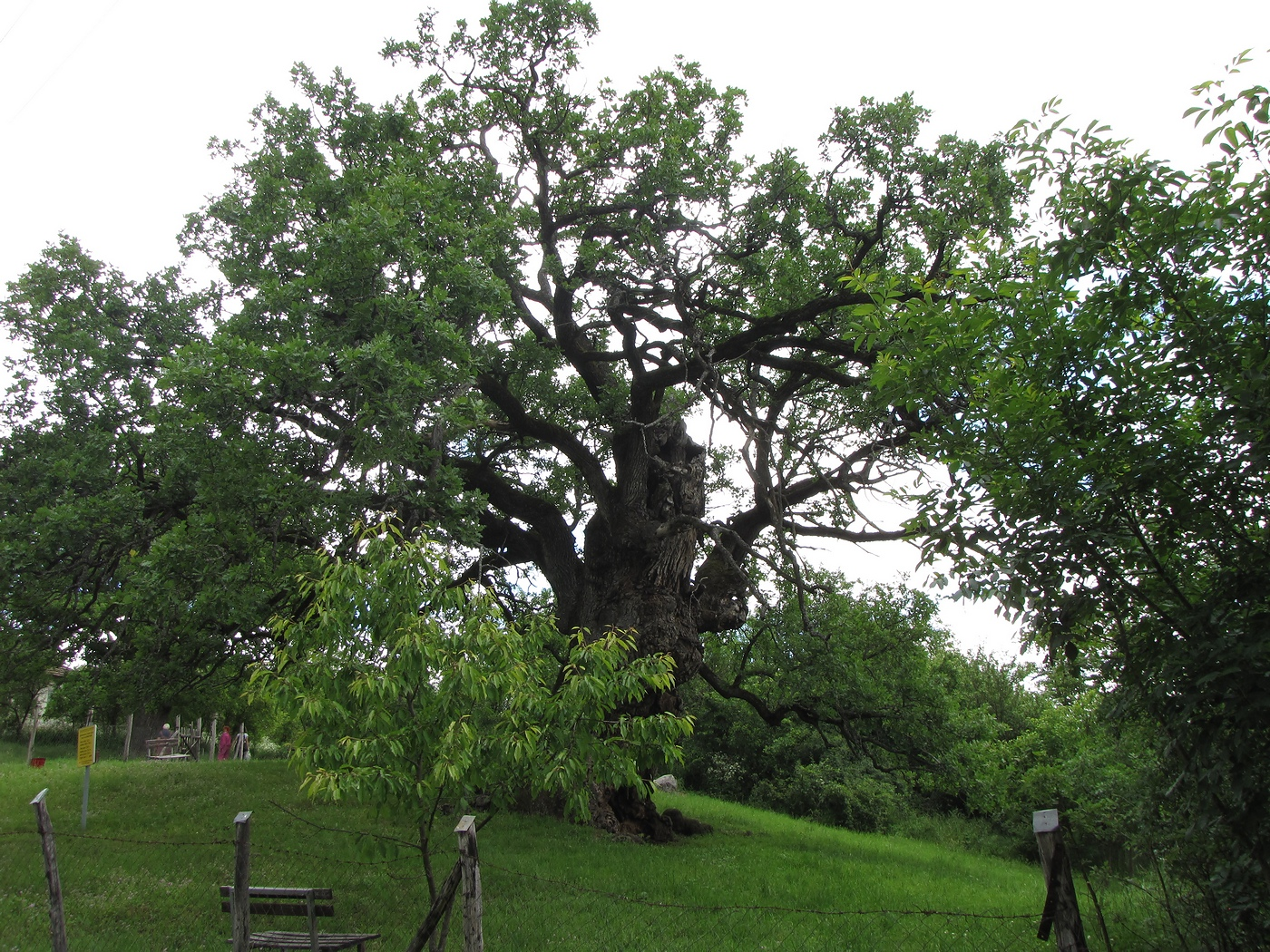
Old sacred oak (zapis) in Divljana, Serbia

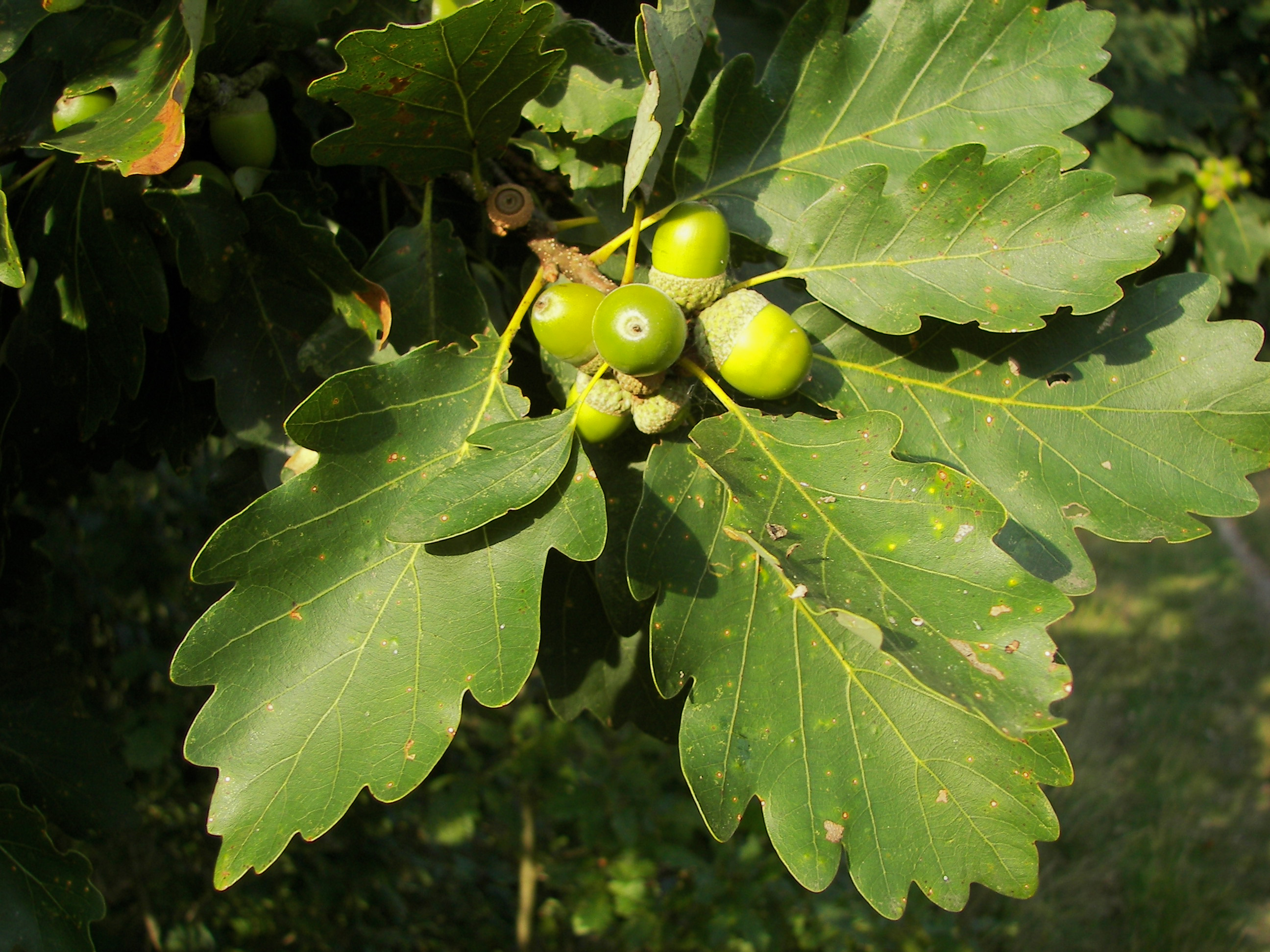
Shoot with leaves and acorn

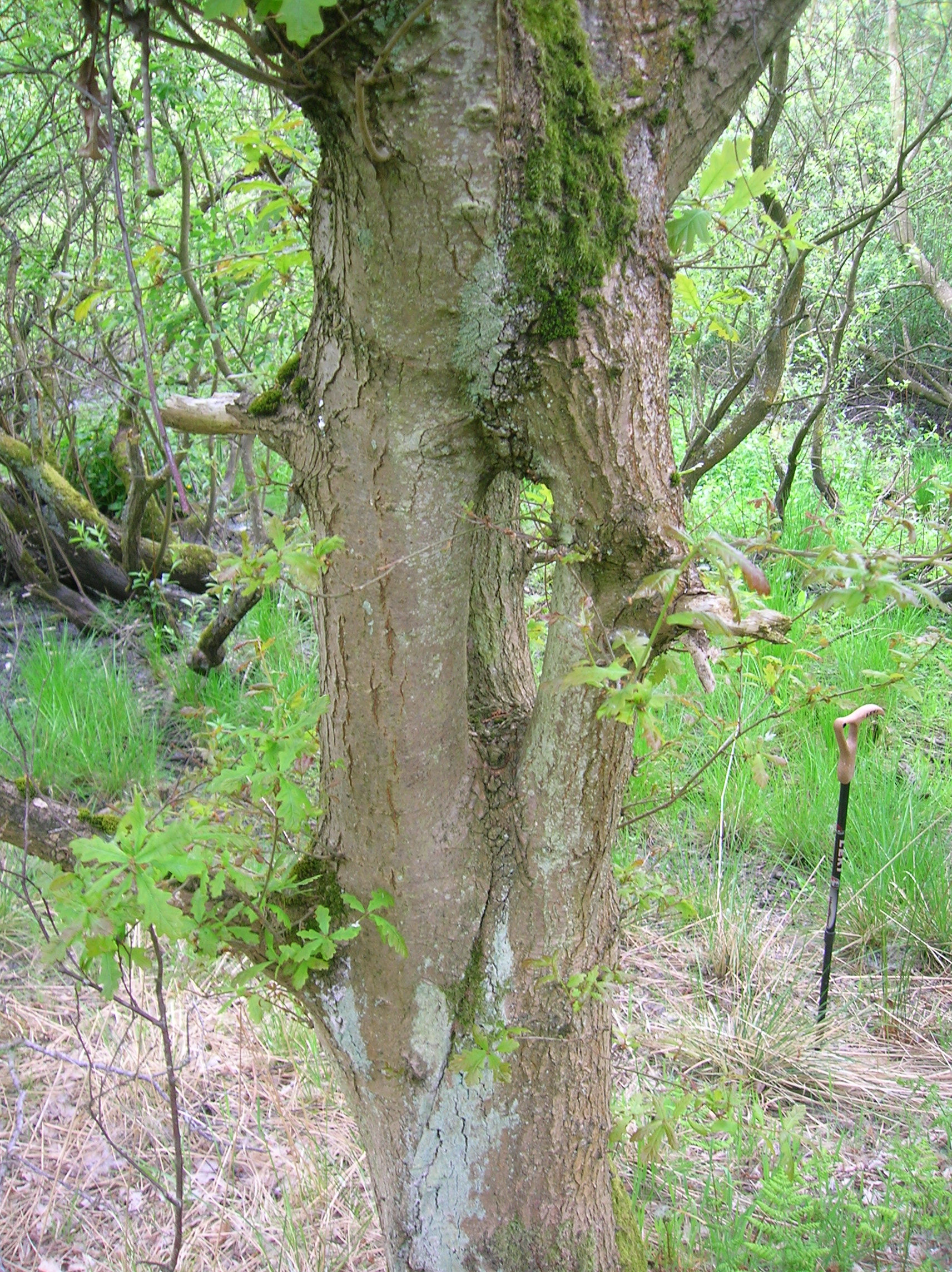
An inosculated tree

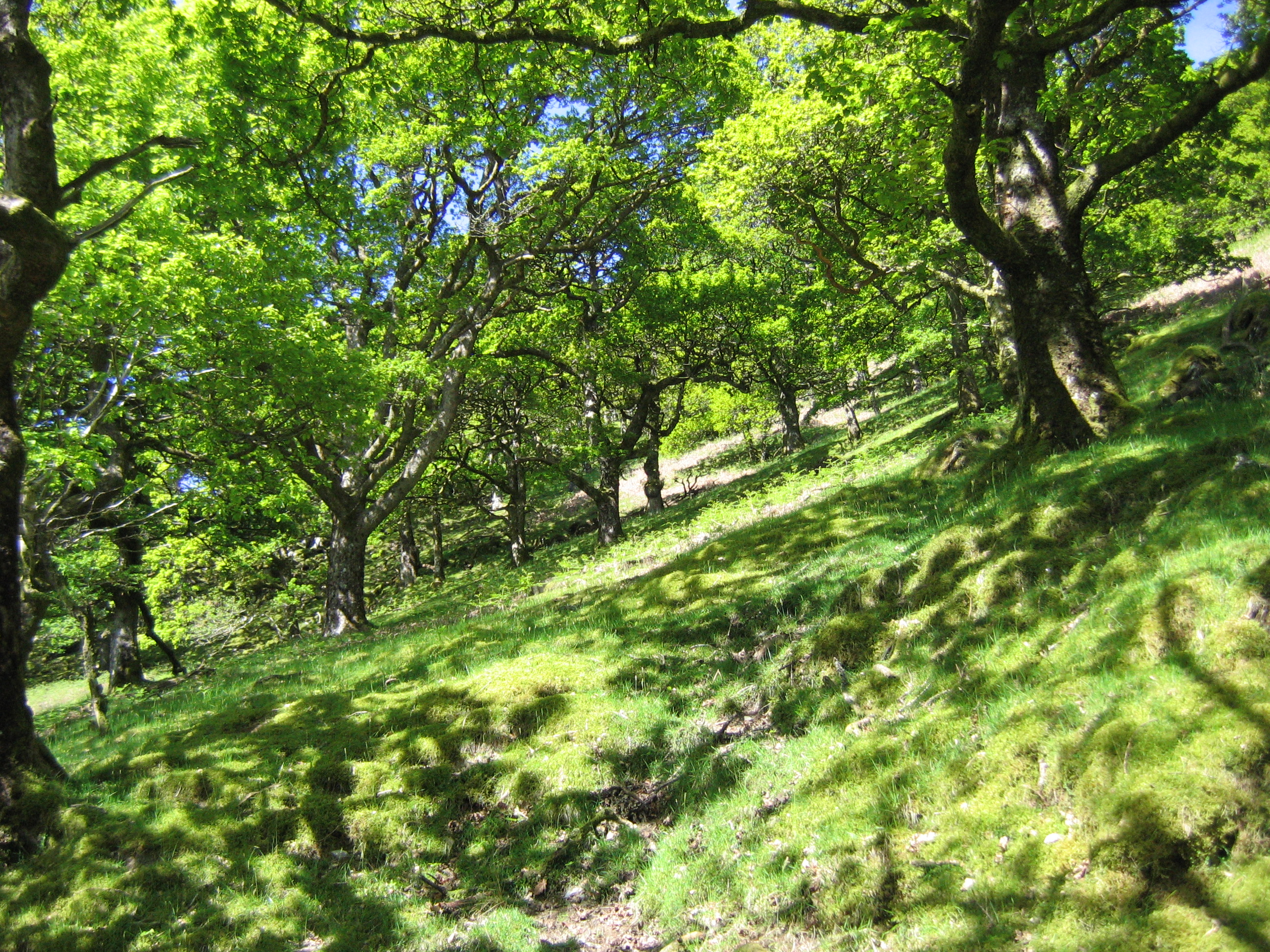
A sessile oak in a forest

=== Comparison with pedunculate oak ===
Significant botanical differences from pedunculate oak (Q. robur) include the stalked leaves, and the stalkless (sessile) acorns from which one of its common names is derived. (With the pedunculate oak, it is the acorns which are pedunculate, i.e. on stalks, while the leaves are not.) It occurs in upland areas of altitudes over 300 m (984 ft) with higher rainfall and shallow, acidic, sandy soils. Its specific epithet petraea means "of rocky places". Q. robur, on the other hand, prefers finer, richer, and deeper soils at lower altitude. Fertile hybrids with Quercus robur named Quercus × rosacea are found wherever the two parent species occur and share or are intermediate in characters between the parents.

== Distribution ==
Sessile oak is found throughout Europe, and is most common in upland areas with heavy soils (rocky and well draining) that is neutral to slightly acidic.

== Taxonomy ==
Quercus petraea was first described by Heinrich Gottfried von Mattuschka in 1777 as a variety of Quercus robur, Quercus robur var. petraea. It was raised to a full species by Franz Kaspar Lieblein in 1784.

=== Subspecies ===
As of March 2023, Plants of the World Online accepted five subspecies:

- Quercus petraea subsp. austrotyrrhenica Brullo, Guarino & Siracusa
- Quercus petraea subsp. huguetiana Franco & G.López
- Quercus petraea subsp. petraea
- Quercus petraea subsp. pinnatiloba (K.Koch) Menitsky
- Quercus petraea subsp. polycarpa (Schur) Soó

== Diseases and pests ==
- Acute oak decline
- Sudden oak death
- The Welsh oak longhorn beetle (Pyrrhidium sanguineum) is named after its host tree; the larvae feed at the bark interface of dead wood.

== Uses ==
Sessile oak is one of the most important species in Europe both economically and ecologically. Oak timber is traditionally used for building, ships and furniture. Today the best woods are used for quality cabinetmaking, veneers and barrel staves. Rougher material is used for fence construction, roof beams and specialist building work. The wood also has antimicrobial properties. It is also a good fuel wood. During autumns with good acorn crops (the mast years), animals are traditionally grazed under the trees to fatten them.

== Notable individual trees ==
=== Pontfadog Oak ===
Known as "Wales's national tree", the Pontfadog Oak was a sessile oak considered to be the oldest oak tree in the UK. Located near Chirk in North Wales, its girth was measured as over 16 metres (53 ft) in 1881 and it was understood to be over 1,200 years old, an age that was due to regular pollarding for much of its life. The hollow trunk had a girth of 12.9 m (42 ft 5 in).

The tree died in April 2013 when it blew down in high winds. However, the Crown Estate propagated a sapling from the original tree and planted it in Windsor Great Park. A further five saplings have been cloned from the Pontfadog Oak, three of which will be planted at the National Botanic Garden of Wales, with the other two going to sites near Pontfadog; one at Chirk Castle and the other at Erddig, as part of a woodland memorial to those who died during the COVID-19 pandemic.

=== Fuck Tree ===
The Fuck Tree is a sessile oak tree located in Hampstead Heath, north London. The tree is located in an established gay cruising area and is famous for its slender trunk which facilitates gay sex. Hampstead Heath has been used for gay cruising since the Victorian era, with the Fuck Tree being the most famous tree in the heath. The Fuck Tree has gained recognition in LGBTQ+ art and culture, including the 2017 art film Fuck Tree by Liz Rosenfeld and the 2023 art exhibition Soft Ground at the Gasworks Gallery by Trevor Yeung.

== See also ==
- Faux de Verzy
