= Church of Peace in Jawor =

Church in Jawor, Poland

Coordinates: 51.05396°N 16.18901°E

Church of Peace
- Kościół Pokoju
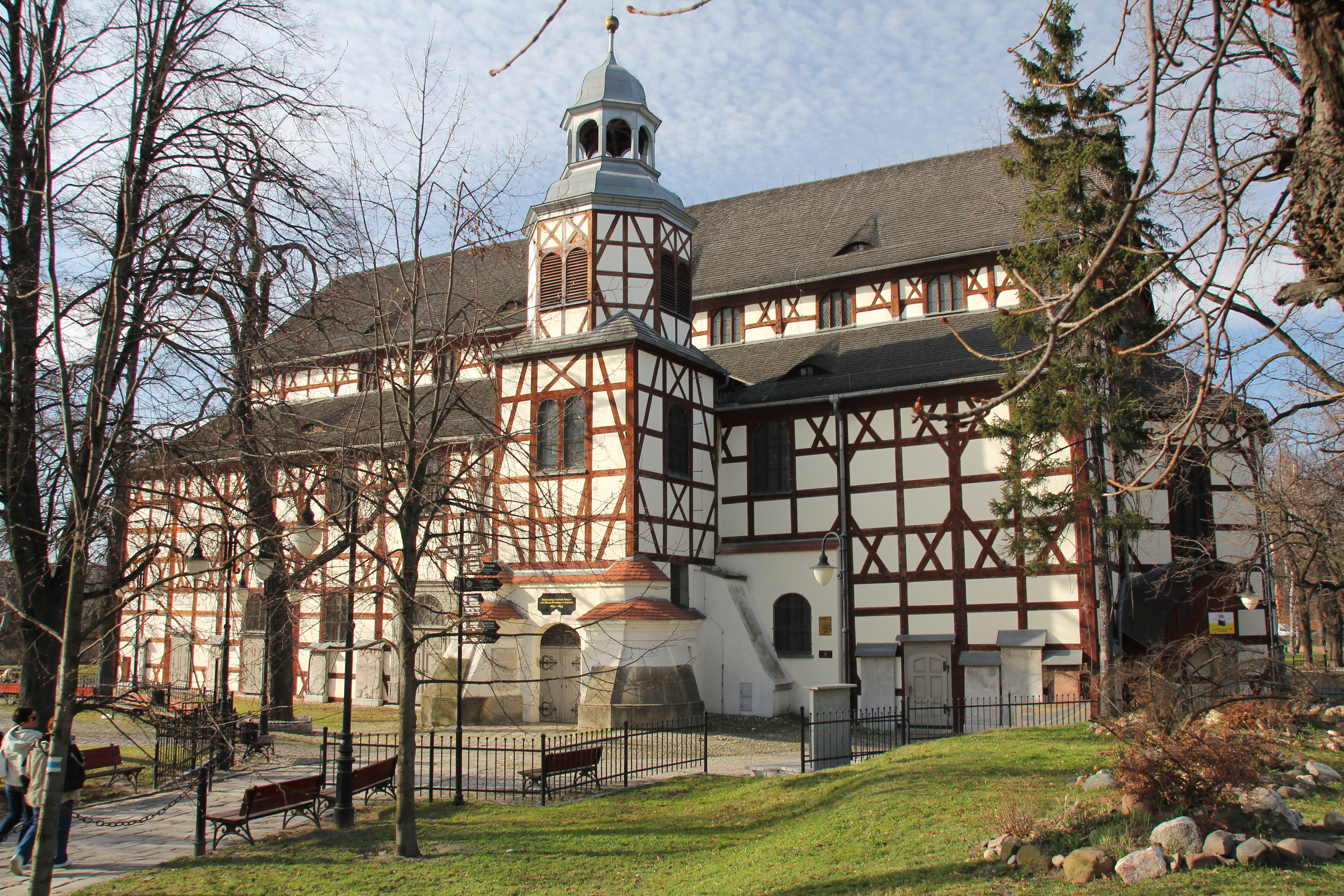

- Location: Jawor
- Country: Poland
- Language: Polish
- Denomination: Lutheran

Architecture
- Functional status: Active

Historic Monument of Poland
- Designated: 2017-03-15
- Reference no.: Dz. U. z 2017 r. poz. 673

UNESCO World Heritage Site
- Part of: Churches of Peace in Jawor and Świdnica
- Criteria: Cultural: (iii), (iv), (vi)
- Reference: 1054-001
- Inscription: 2001 (25th Session)

The Church of Peace in Jawor (German: Friedenskirche, Polish: Kościół Pokoju) is a wooden Evangelical Lutheran church of a wattle and daub structure, located in Jawor, Poland. It is a historic sacral building built under the agreements of the Peace of Westphalia concluded in 1648, which ended the Thirty Years' War.

== History ==
It was built between 1654 and 1655 according to the design of Albrecht von Säbisch, using half-timbered construction. The building was made of perishable materials: wood, straw and clay. The following Baroque elements of the interior are noteworthy: the altar, the pulpit and the baptismal font. On the northern and southern sides there are four storeys of galleries, decorated with paintings illustrating the Old and New Testaments, landscapes with castles and heraldic shields. All structural elements are covered with polychromes with motifs of fancifully coiled plant tendrils. The building stands out in the history of European art of the second half of the 17th century due to its uniqueness and high artistic value. It is one of the three so-called Churches of Peace built after the Thirty Years' War and one of the two preserved to this day (the other one is in Świdnica).

The church, due to its importance to the culture and heritage of mankind, was inscribed on the UNESCO World Heritage List.

== Jawor Peace Concerts ==
Peace Concerts are organised in Jawor every year from May to September. These events take place in the historic interiors of the Church of Peace. Chamber music performed by artists from Poland, the Czech Republic and Germany combined with the venue of the concerts create a special atmosphere and provide an unforgettable experience. A total of 67 concerts have already taken place in Jawor, including 29 concerts performed by foreign artists. So far the following artists have performed: Poznańskie Słowiki Choir under the direction of Stefan Stuligrosz, Windsbacher Knabenchor, University of Wrocław Choir "Gaudium", "Leopoldinum" Chamber Orchestra, Amadeus Orchestra conducted by Agnieszka Duczmal, Sudecka Philharmonic Symphony Orchestra, Spirituals Singers Band, Wilanów Quartet, Camerata Cracovia, Folk Ensemble "Sierra Manta", Brandenburgischer Kammerchor, Ledl Jazz Quintet and many others.

== Organs ==
Adolph Lummert's instrument, later rebuilt two times by Schlag & Söhne company in 1899 and from 1905 to 1906, subsequently renovated in 1937. The choir holds the remains of Schlag's pneumatic, three-channel playing table. The instrument was reconstructed to its condition as it was in Lummert's time. The reconstruction work was carried out by „Eule of Bautzen” and „Ars organum by Adam Olejnik”.

Disposition of the instrument

Manuał I	Manuał II	Pedał
1. Bourdon 16'	1. Principal 8'	1. Subbass 16'
2. Principal 8'	2. Salicet 8'	2. Violon 16'
3. Gambe 8'	3. Portunalflöte 8'	3. Principal 16'
4. Doppelflöte 8'	4. Octave 4'	4. Untersatz 32'
5. Trompete 8'	5. Portunalflöte 4'	5. Posaune 16'
6. Gemshorn 8'	6. Nasard 2 2/3'	6. Trompete 8'
7. Doppelflöte 4'	7. Superoctave 2'	7. Octavbass 8'
8. Octave 4'		8. Doppelflöte 8'
9. Superoctave 2'		
10. Quinte 2 2/3'		
11. Cornet 3 fach		
12. Mixtur 4 fach		

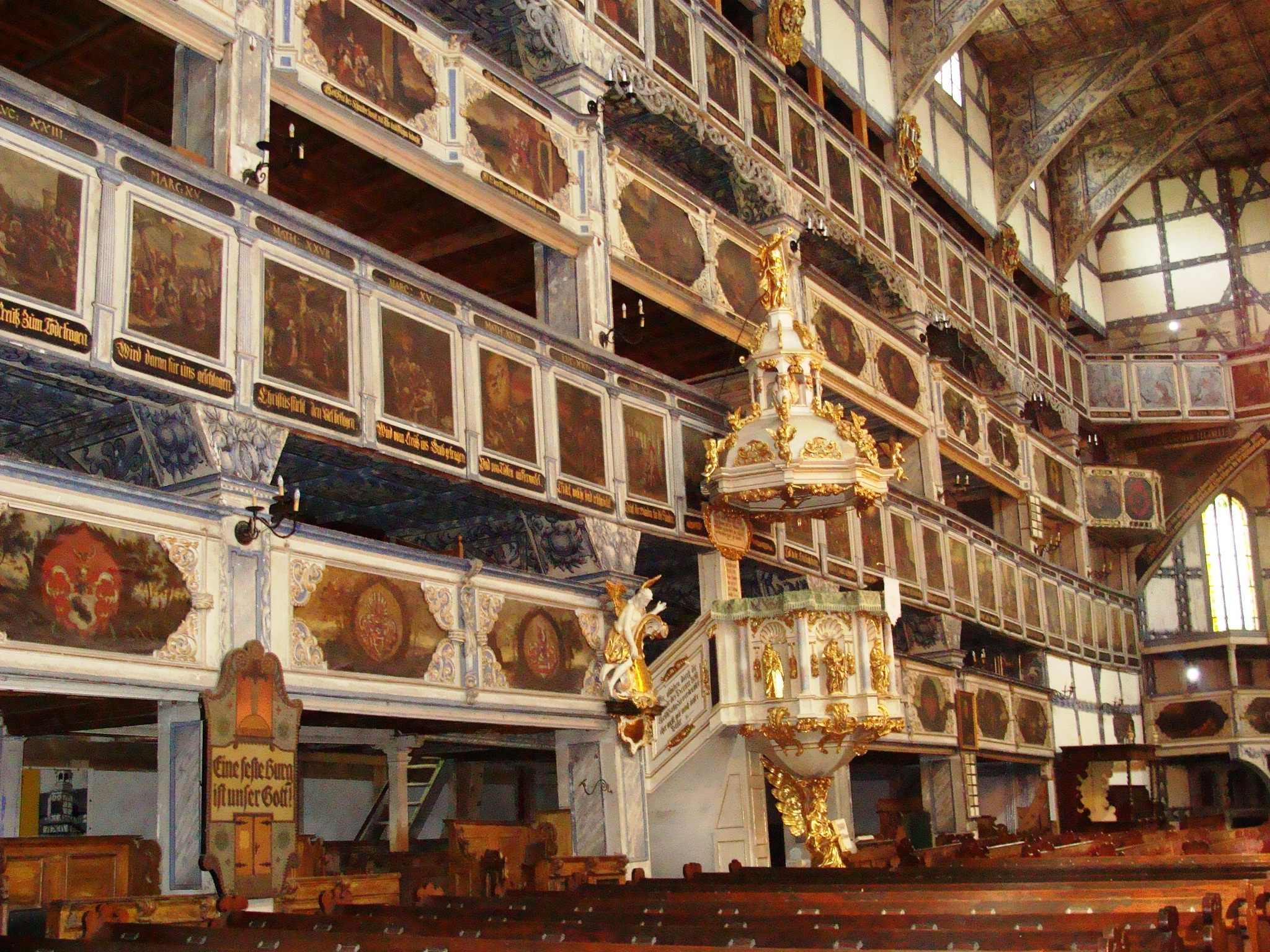
Interior

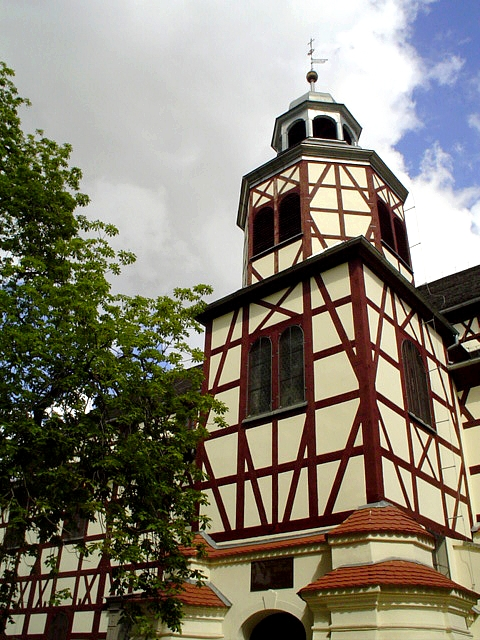
Tower

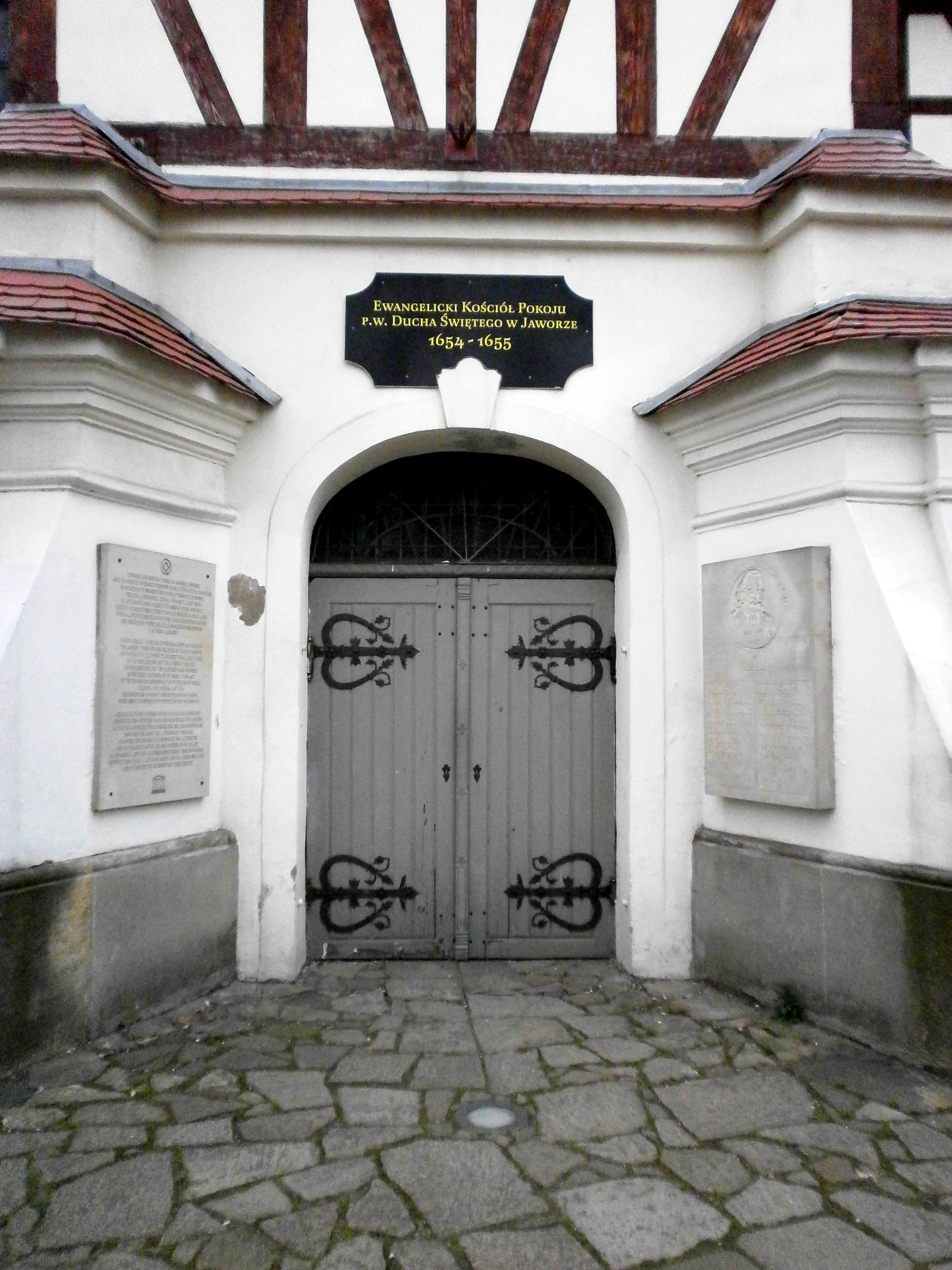
Entrance to the church

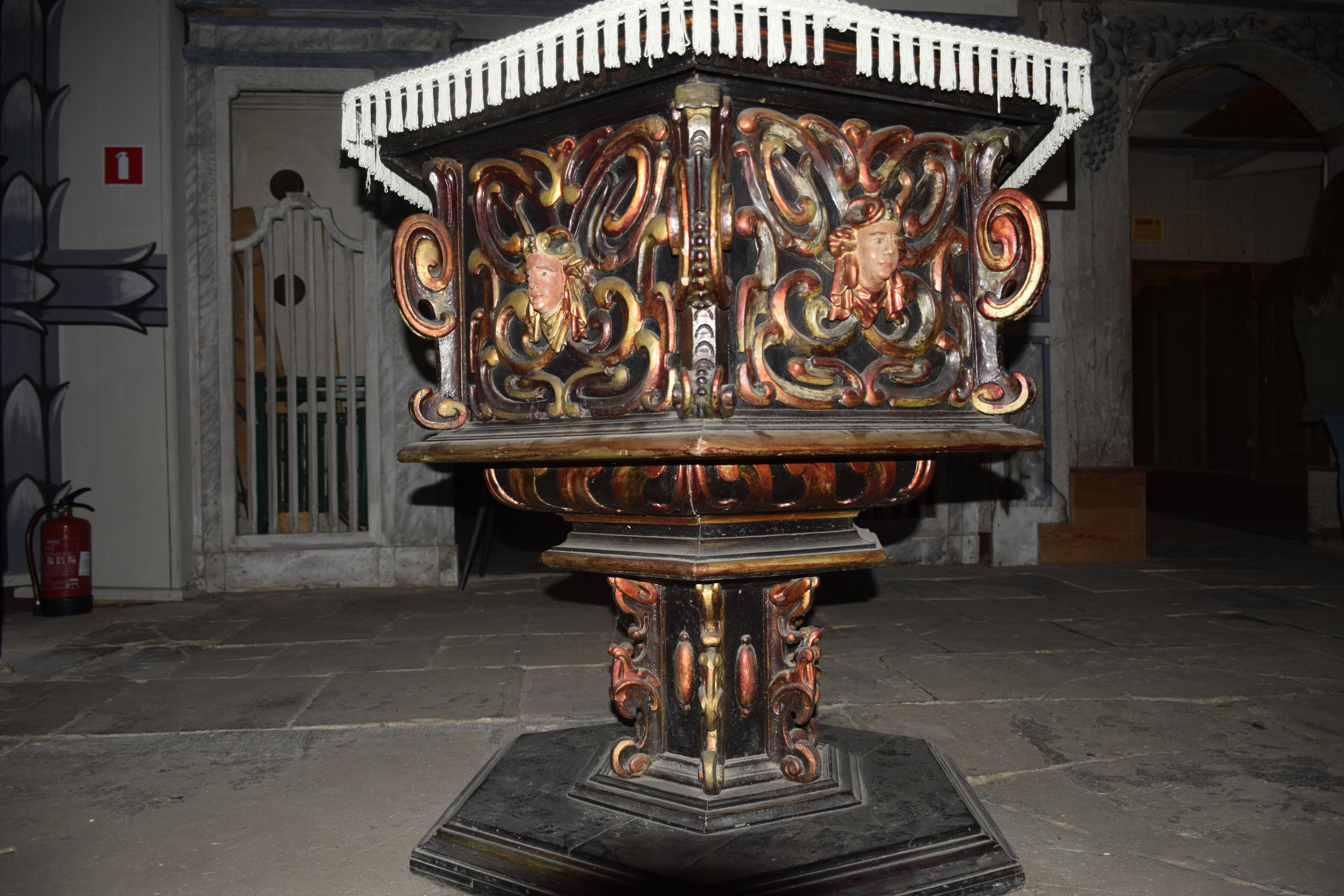
Baptismal font

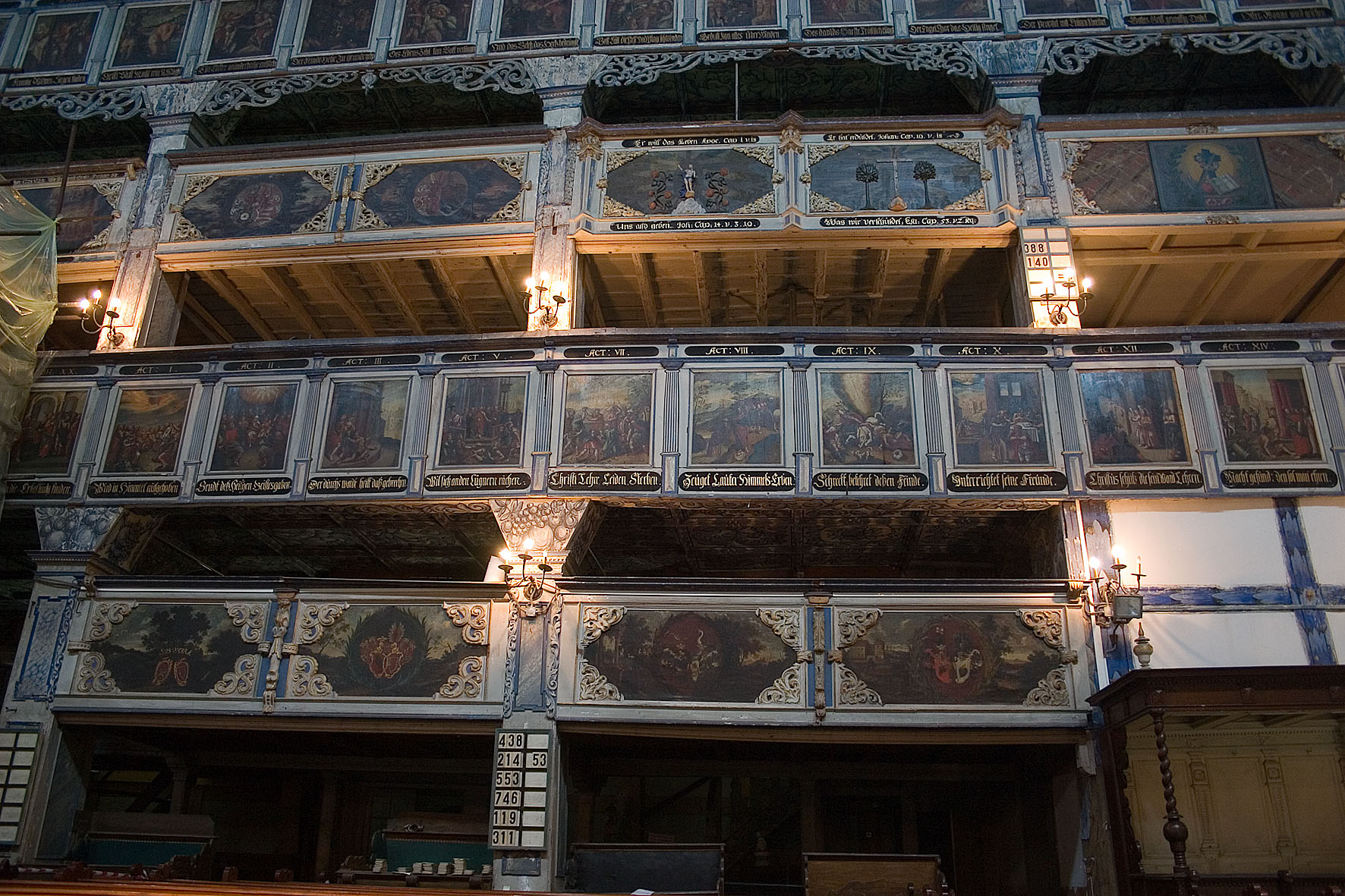
Galleries decorated with paintings

== See also ==
- Churches of Peace
