= Jawor =

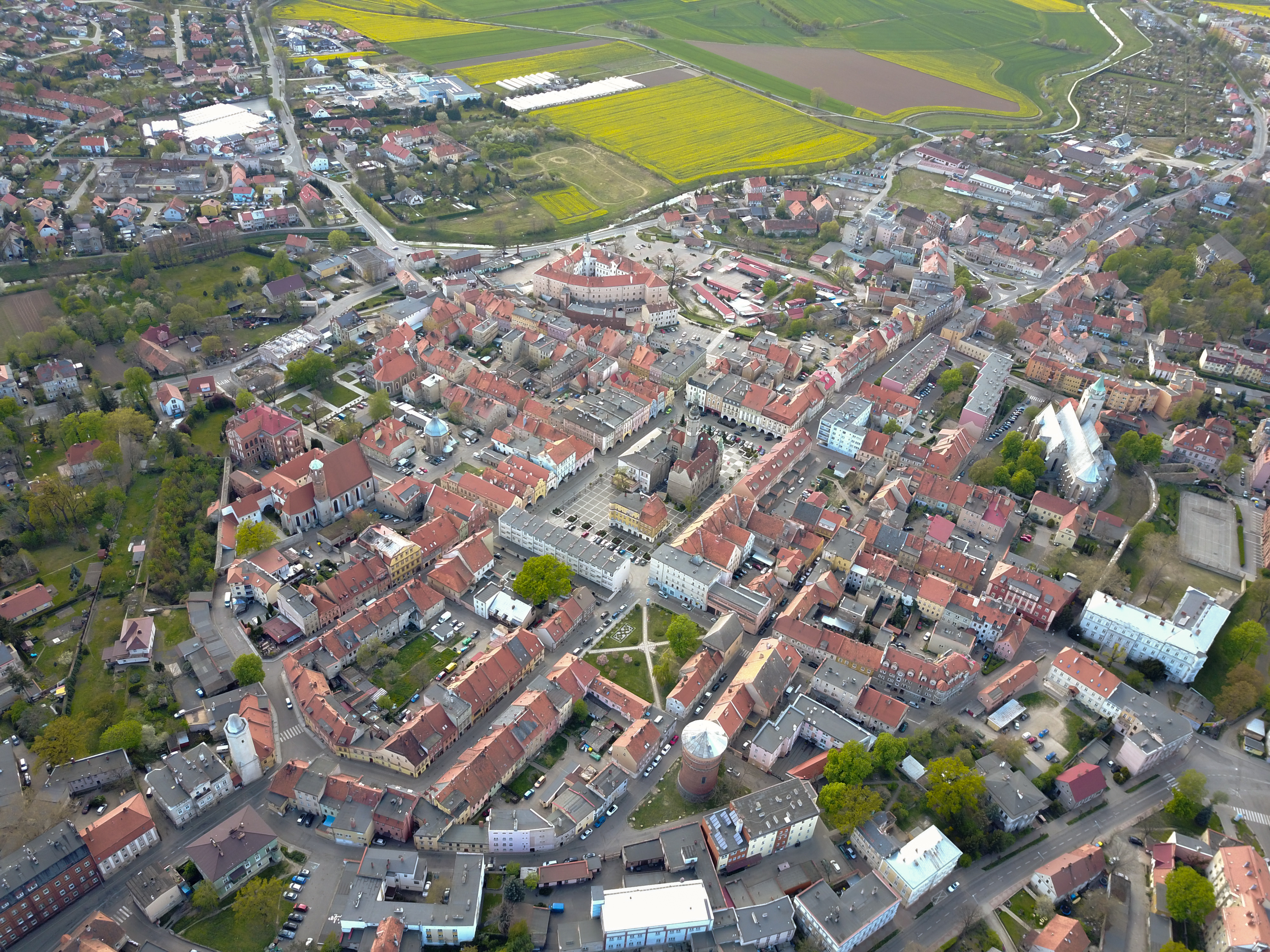
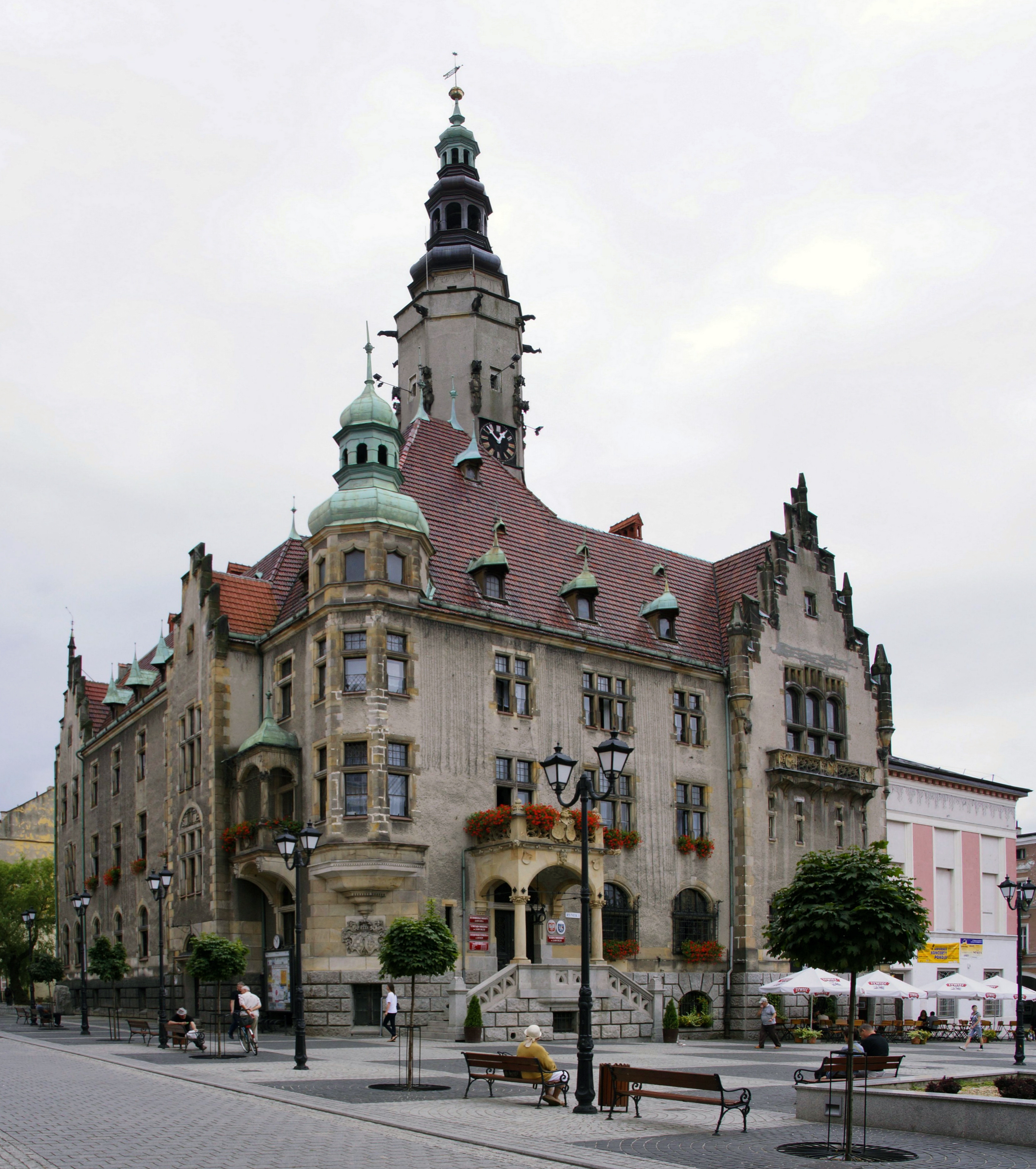
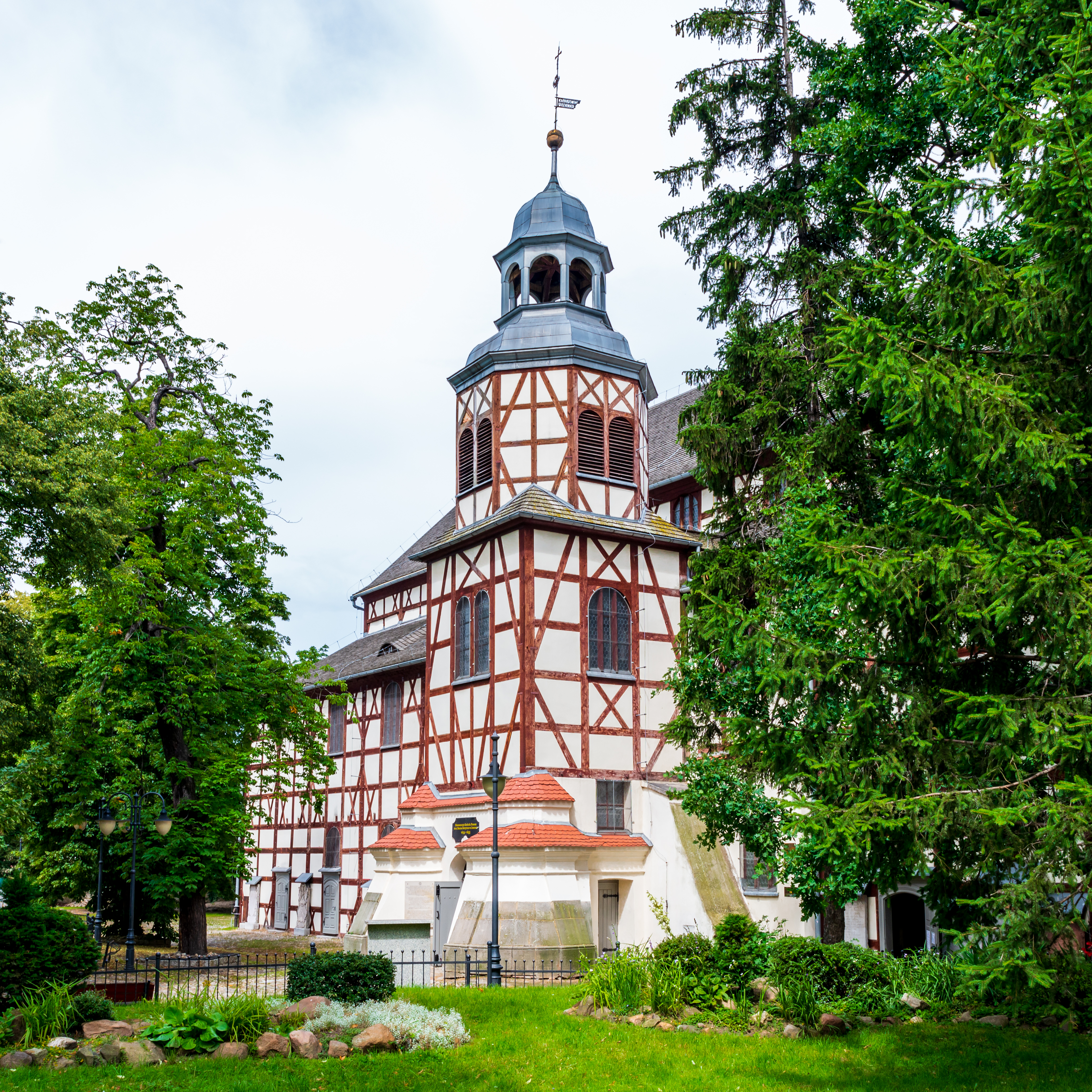
- Aerial view of the Old Town Town Hall Church of Peace

- Flag Coat of arms

- Location within Poland
- Coordinates: 51°03′N 16°12′E
- Country: Poland
- Voivodeship: Lower Silesian
- County: Jawor
- Gmina: Jawor (urban gmina)

Government
  - Mayor: Emilian Bera

Area
  - Total: 18.8 km^{2} (7.3 sq mi)

Population (2019-06-30)
  - Total: 22,890
  - Density: 1,220/km^{2} (3,150/sq mi)
- Time zone: UTC+1 (CET)
  - Summer (DST): UTC+2 (CEST)
- Postal code: 59-400
- Car plates: DJA
- Website: jawor.pl

Jawor [ˈjavɔr] (German: Jauer) is a town in south-western Poland with 22,890 inhabitants (2019). It is situated in the Lower Silesian Voivodeship. It is the seat of Jawor County.

One of the oldest towns in the region, with a history of more than a thousand years, Jawor was one of the main centers of weaving in Silesia and, in 1274–1392, the capital of an eponymous principality ruled by a local line of the Piast dynasty. It has a preserved medieval urban layout with several Gothic, Renaissance and Baroque structures, including the Church of Peace, a Historic Monument of Poland and UNESCO World Heritage Site. Jawor is the site for electrical machinery, chemical, paper and food industries, and there are numerous granite and basalt quarries near the town. Through the town flows the 31 mile long Raging Nysa river (pl: Nysa Szalona).

== Etymology ==
The name of the city Jawor comes from the Polish word for "sycamore maple." The earliest recorded name dates from 1133 when the city was written down as Jawr and in 1203 as Jawor. Until the 16th century the name was written down in Latin in various forms such as: Iavor, Iavr, Javr, Javor, Jaur, Jaura, Jawer, Jauor. The Polish form Jawor continued to be used, for example, in painting from 1562 located in church of St.Martin. The other form Iawor is recorded in a document from 1248, and in a document from 1277 the name Iaver is used. In 1295, in the Latin work Liber fundationis episcopatus Vratislaviensis, the city is written as Jawor. In the 1475 Latin Statuta Synodalia Episcoporum Wratislaviensium, which also contains the oldest Polish-language printing, it is seen as Jaworensis.

The German name Jauer is a Germanized version of the original Slavic name, and by 1750 the Polish name Jawor was still used in Polish by Prussian authorities. The German name became official after 1763 and the Austro-Prussian war.

== History ==
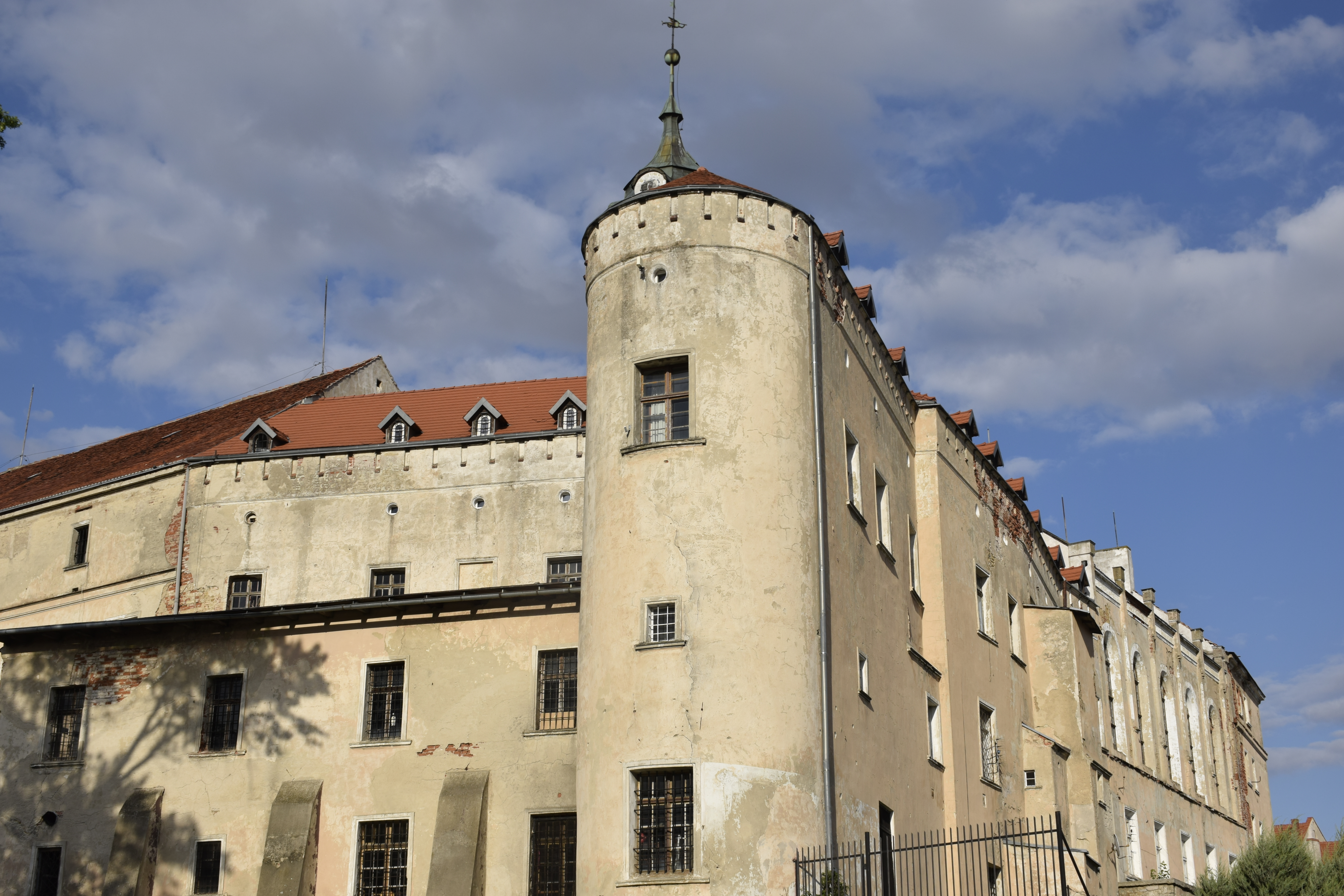
Piast Castle, former residence of local Piast dukes

Jawor was the main stronghold of the Trzebowianie tribe, one of the Polish tribes, and became part of the emerging Polish state in the 10th century. According to medieval chronicles the settlement was expanded in the 11th century. It was granted town rights between 1242 and 1275. As a result of the fragmentation of Poland, Jawor became part of the Duchy of Silesia, then the Duchy of Legnica from 1248, and from 1274 it was the capital of the Duchy of Jawor, the southwesternmost duchy of medieval Poland, before being integrated with the Duchy of Świdnica in 1346, part of which it remained until 1392, all the time remaining under the founding dynasty of the Piasts. By the end of the 13th century, stone defensive walls were erected. Between 1279 and 1334 the St. Martin church was built and in 1311 the St. Barbara church was renovated. Churches of St. Martin and St. Barbara are the oldest churches in Jawor. In 1324 the first hospital was founded. The first known image of the coat of arms of Jawor, preserved on the city seal comes from 1300. Jawor has grown into one of the most important centers of weaving in Lower Silesia. In 1329 Jawor was granted staple right by Duke Henry I of Jawor. In the 14th century, the first guilds were founded, bringing together furriers, tailors, clothiers and merchants.

After loss of the town by Poland, it was then ruled by Bohemia and later Austria. The town suffered during the Thirty Years' War (1618–1648) as a result of repeated invasions, occupations, religious persecutions and epidemics. In 1626 it was plundered by the Austrians, in 1633 briefly occupied by Saxony and recaptured by Austria, in 1639 occupied by the Swedes and in 1640 recaptured by Austria, in 1642 occupied by the Swedes, then the Austrians and again the Swedes, finally captured in 1648 by the Austrians, who plundered and burned the town and expelled its inhabitants. After the war, in accordance with the Peace of Westphalia, the so-called Church of Peace was built, however, the Protestants were still being discriminated against by the Austrian administration.

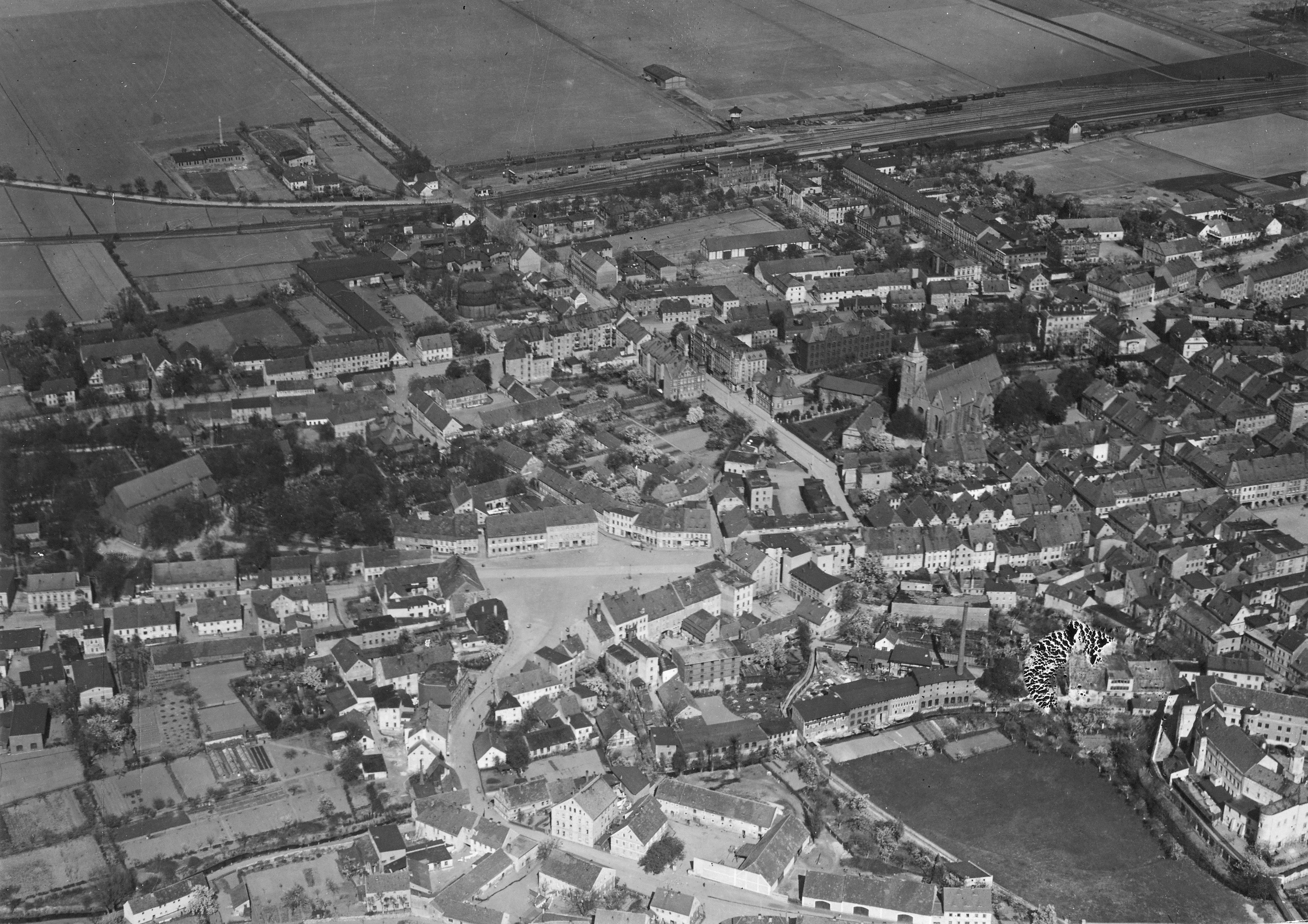
Early 20th-century view of the northern part of town

In the 18th century, the town and region was the subject of Austrian-Prussian wars, eventually passing to Prussia in 1763. The Prussians turned the Piast Castle into a prison. In 1776 the town suffered a fire. On 14 May 1807, during the Napoleonic Wars and Polish national liberation struggles, Polish troops marched through the town, the day before they fought the victorious battle of Struga against the more numerous Prussians. In 1871 along with Prussia the town became part of Germany, and remained within until 1945.

During World War II the Germans imprisoned French and Norwegian women in the castle, participants of anti-German resistance movements. In the final stages of the war, in early 1945, most of the town's population was evacuated by the Germans. It was captured by the Soviets in February and passed to Poland in April. After the war the region officially became part of Poland again as per the Potsdam Agreement. Also according to the agreement, the Germans who had not already fled, were expelled and Polish citizens, many of whom had been expelled from the Polish areas annexed by the Soviet Union, became the majority.

From 1975 to 1998 it was administratively located in the Legnica Voivodeship.

On 9 May 2002, a ceremony to commemorate officers of the Special Operations Executive murdered by Nazi Germany at the Gross-Rosen concentration camp, was held in Jawor, with the participation of representatives of the Embassy of the United Kingdom in Warsaw, the Institute of National Remembrance and GROM.

== Sights ==
- Church of Peace in Jawor, dating from 1655; a UNESCO World Heritage Site and Historic Monument of Poland
- Jawor Castle, former residence of local Piast dukes
- Jawor "Soliński", the nearby mountain peak
- Gothic-Renaissance St. Martin's church, dating from 1267 to 1290.
- Regional Museum (Muzeum Regionalne) located in the former Bernardine monastery
- Town Hall
- Medieval town walls
- Strzegomska Tower
- Municipal Theatre (Teatr Miejski)
- St. Adalbert chapel
- St. Barbara church
- Former Beguine monastery and church
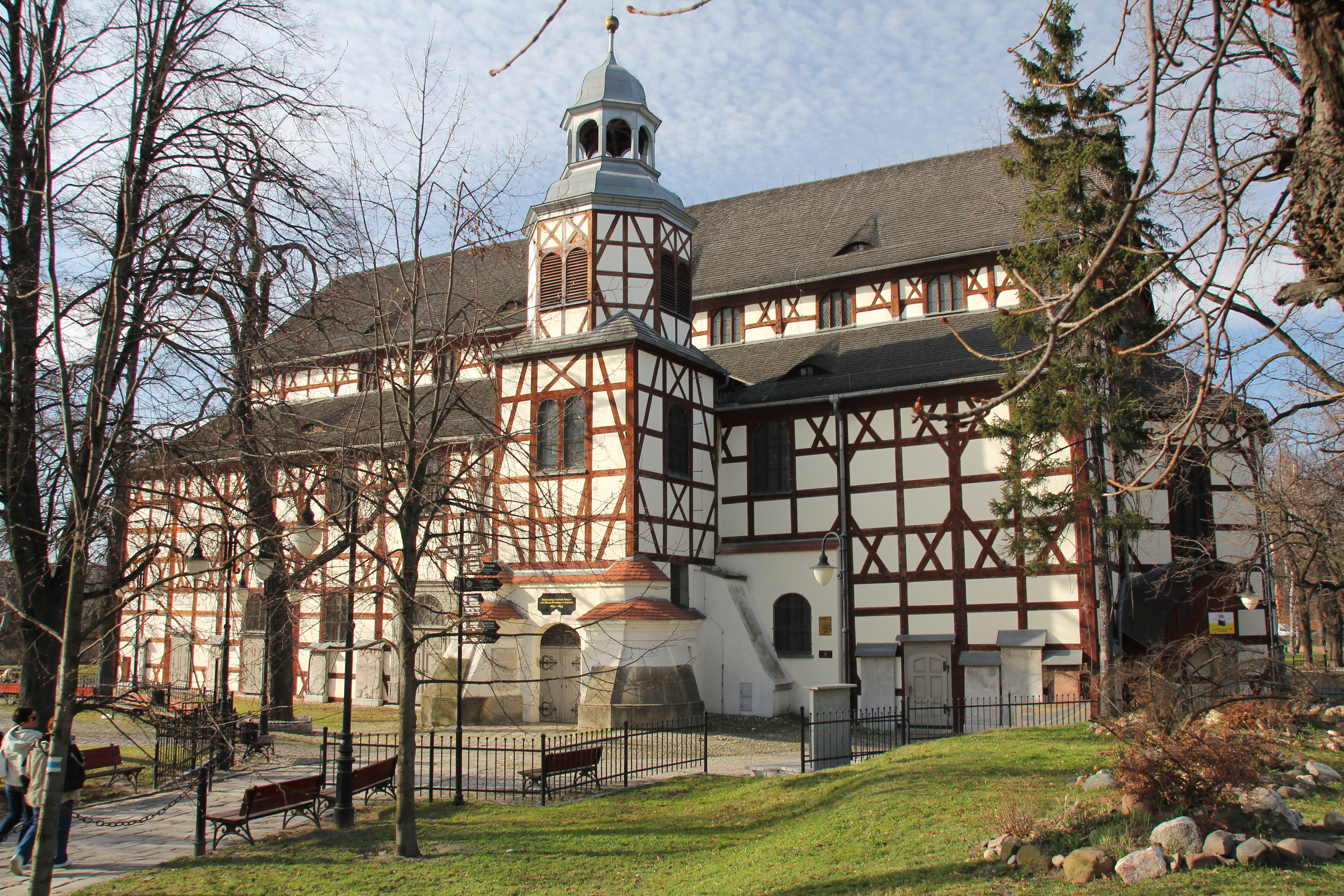
Church of Peace

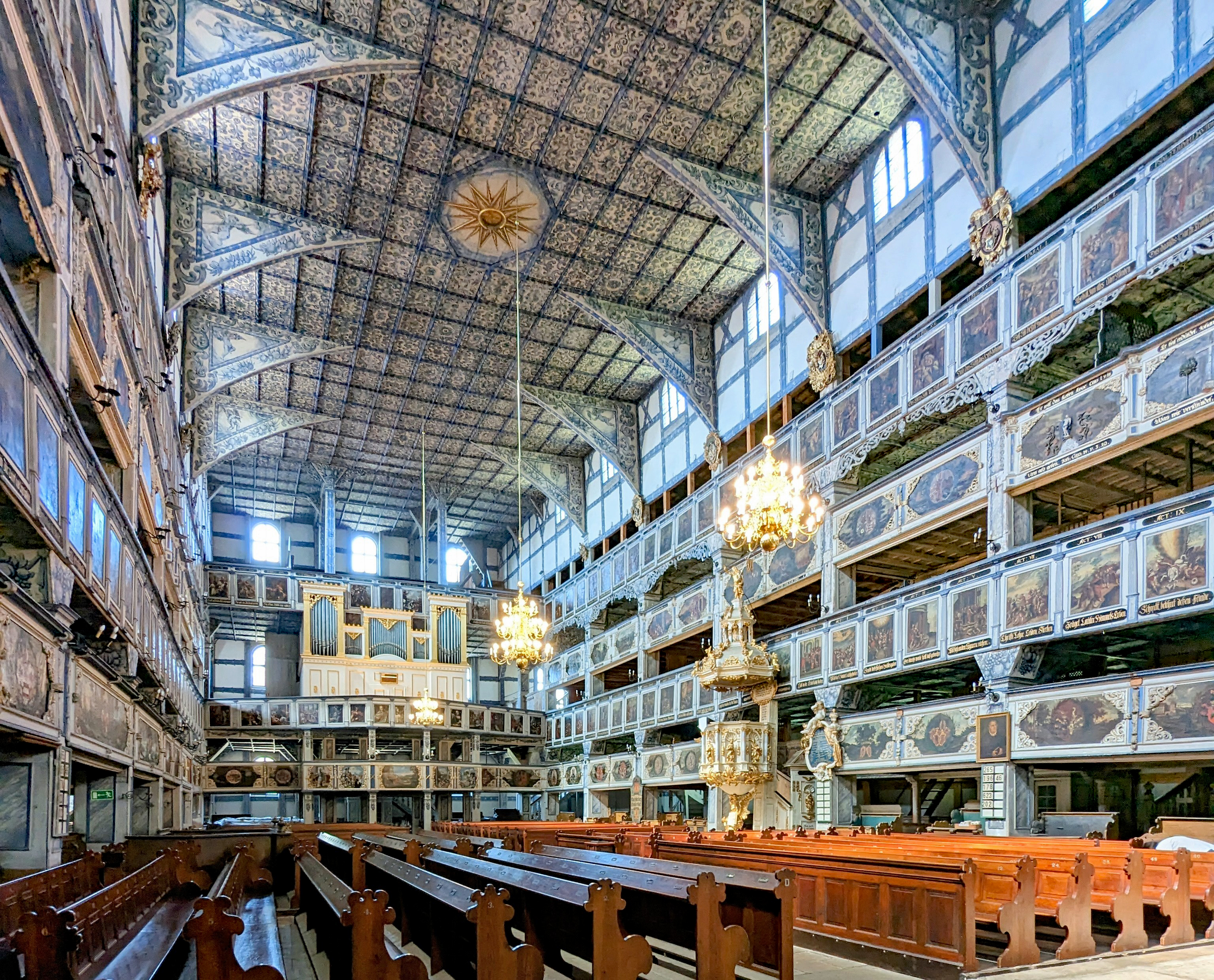
Church of Peace, interior

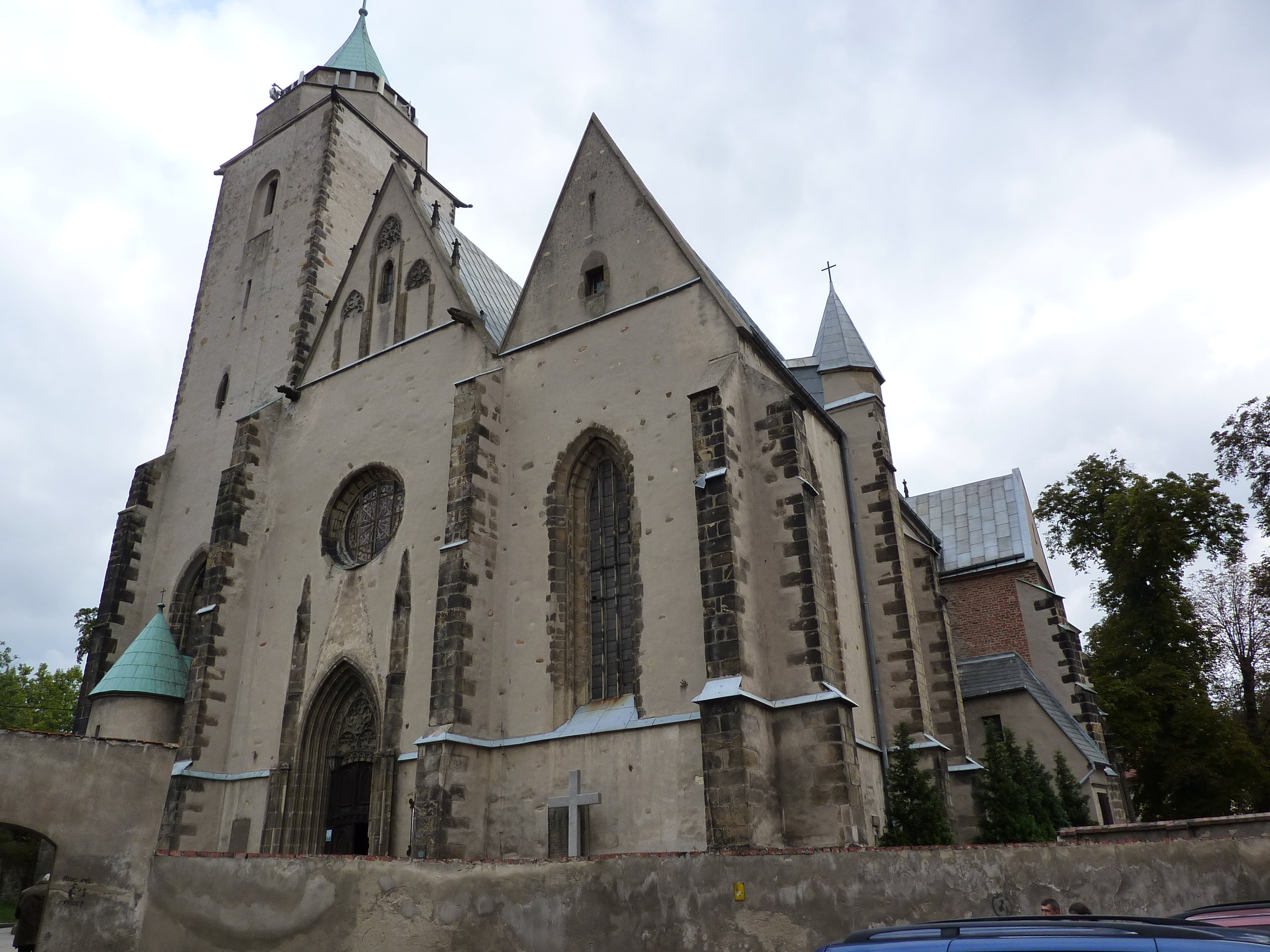
St. Martin church

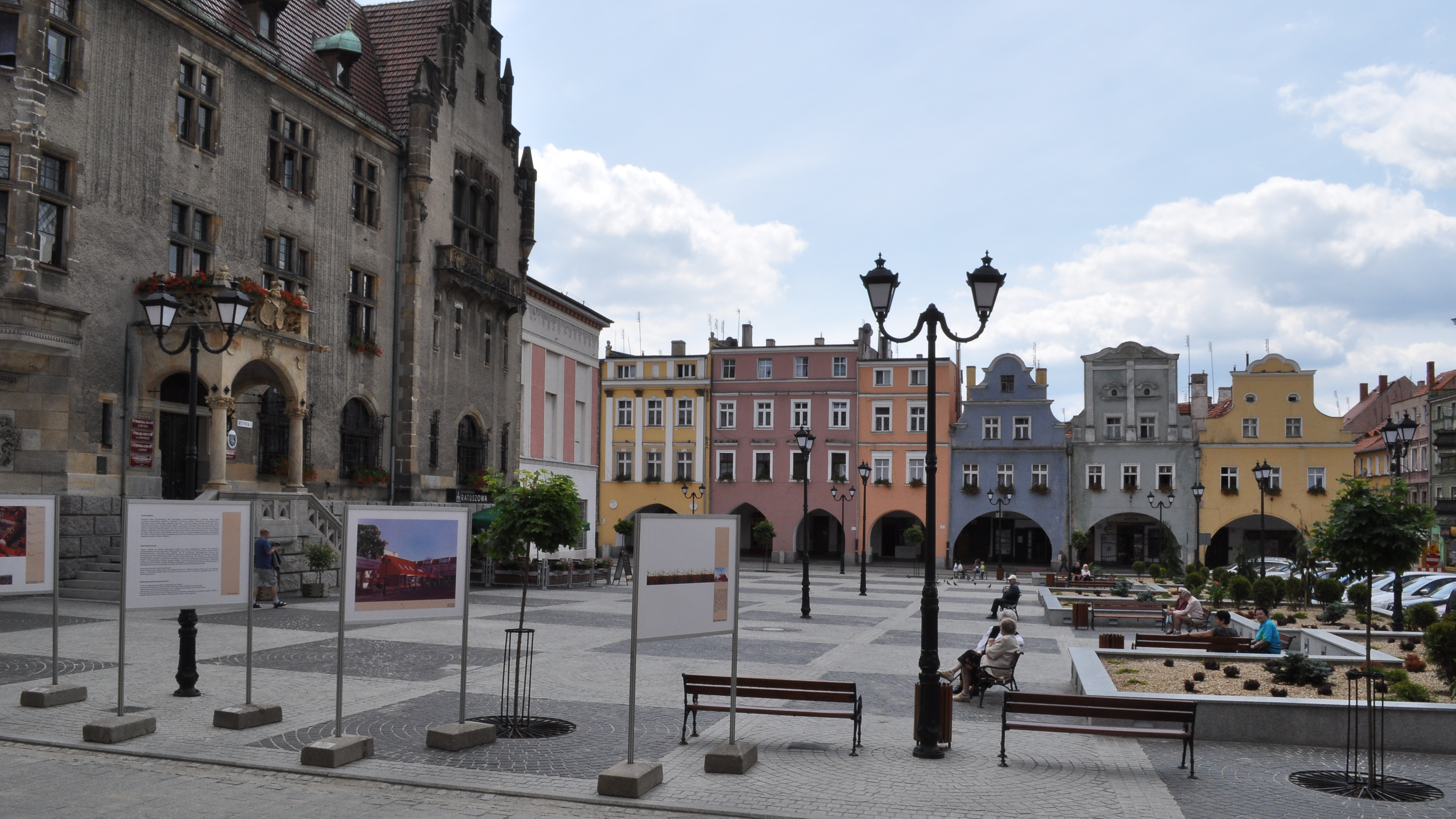
Market Square (Rynek)

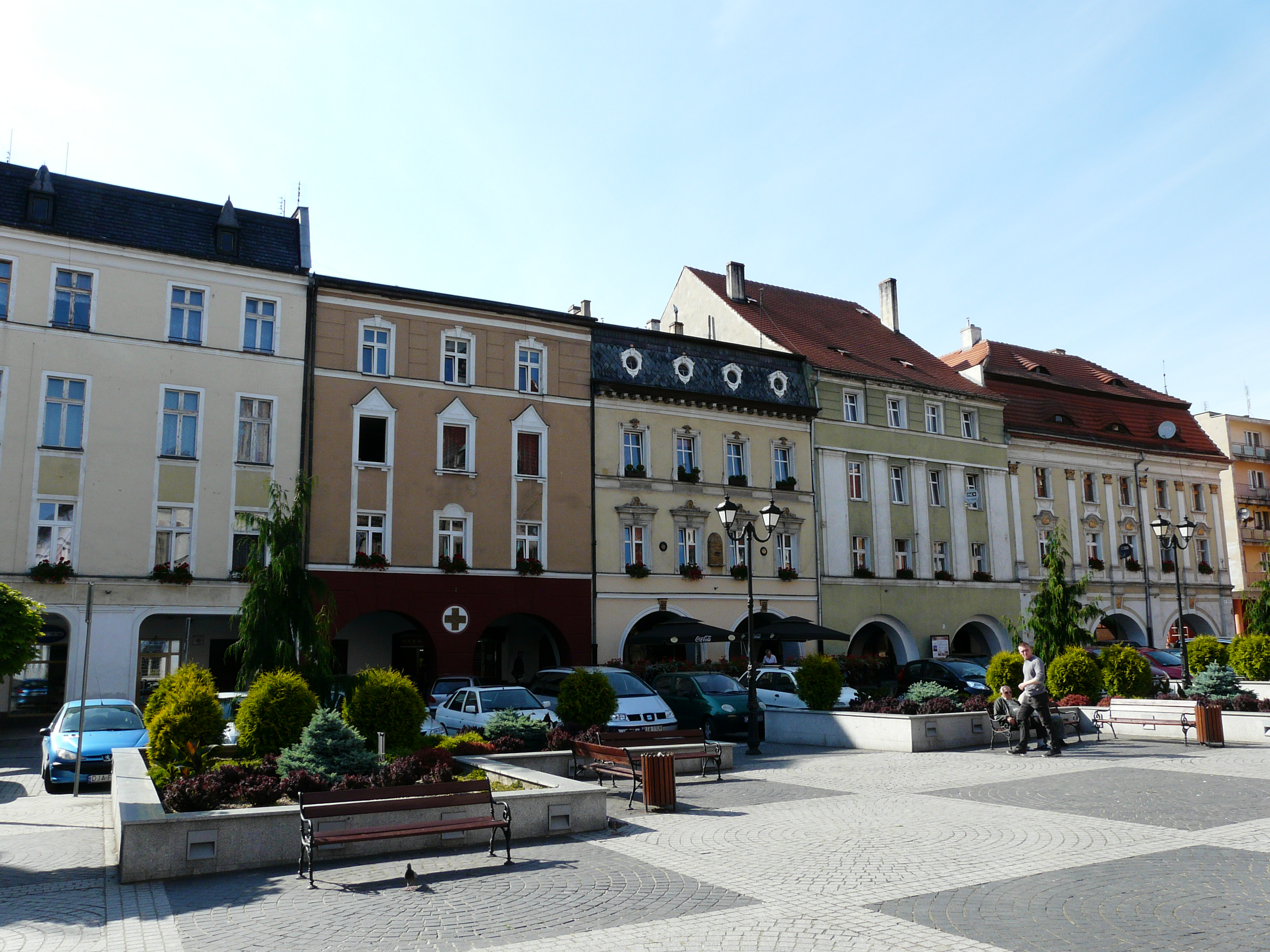
Old townhouses at the Market Square

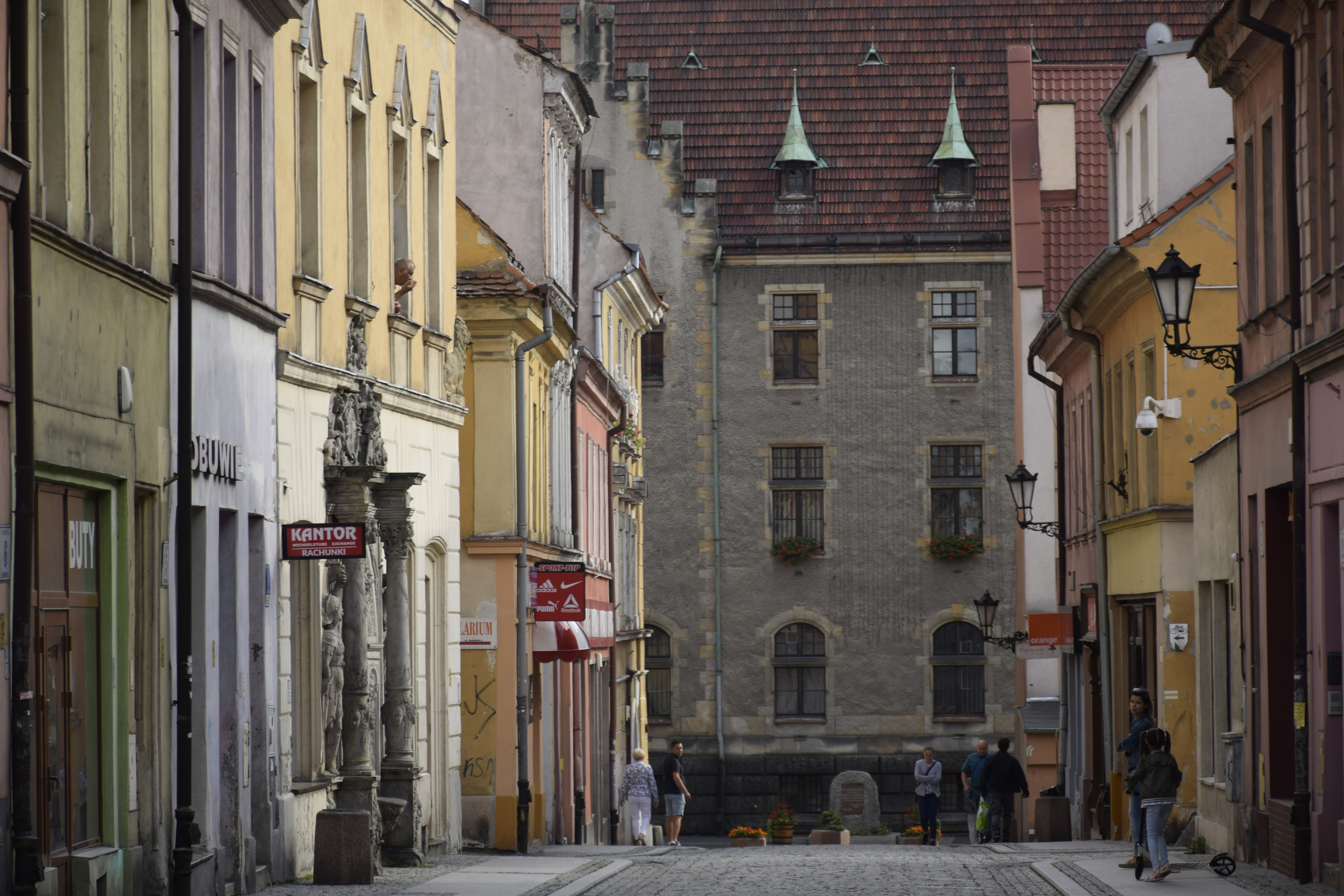
Legnicka Street in the Old Town

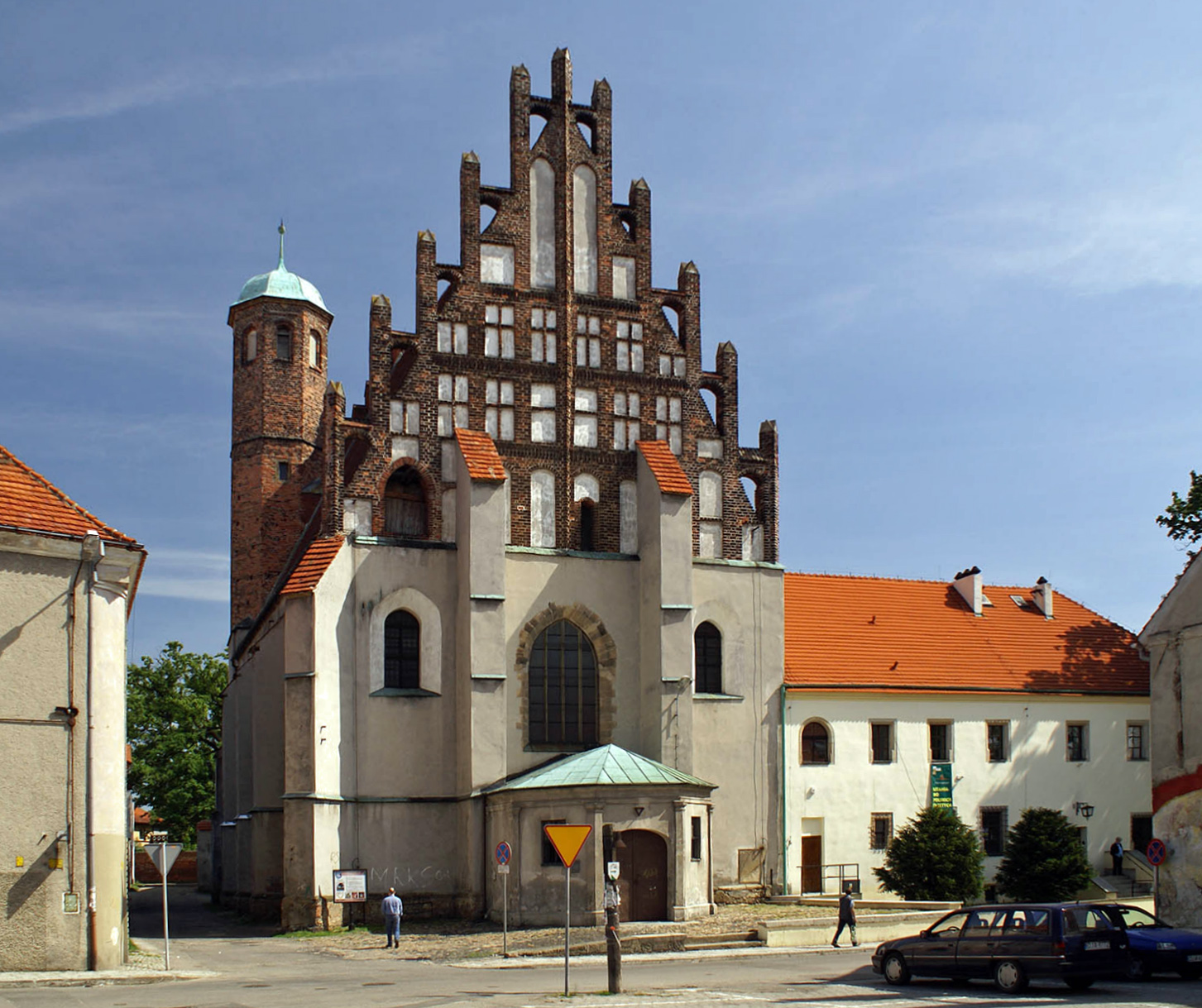
Former Bernardine monastery

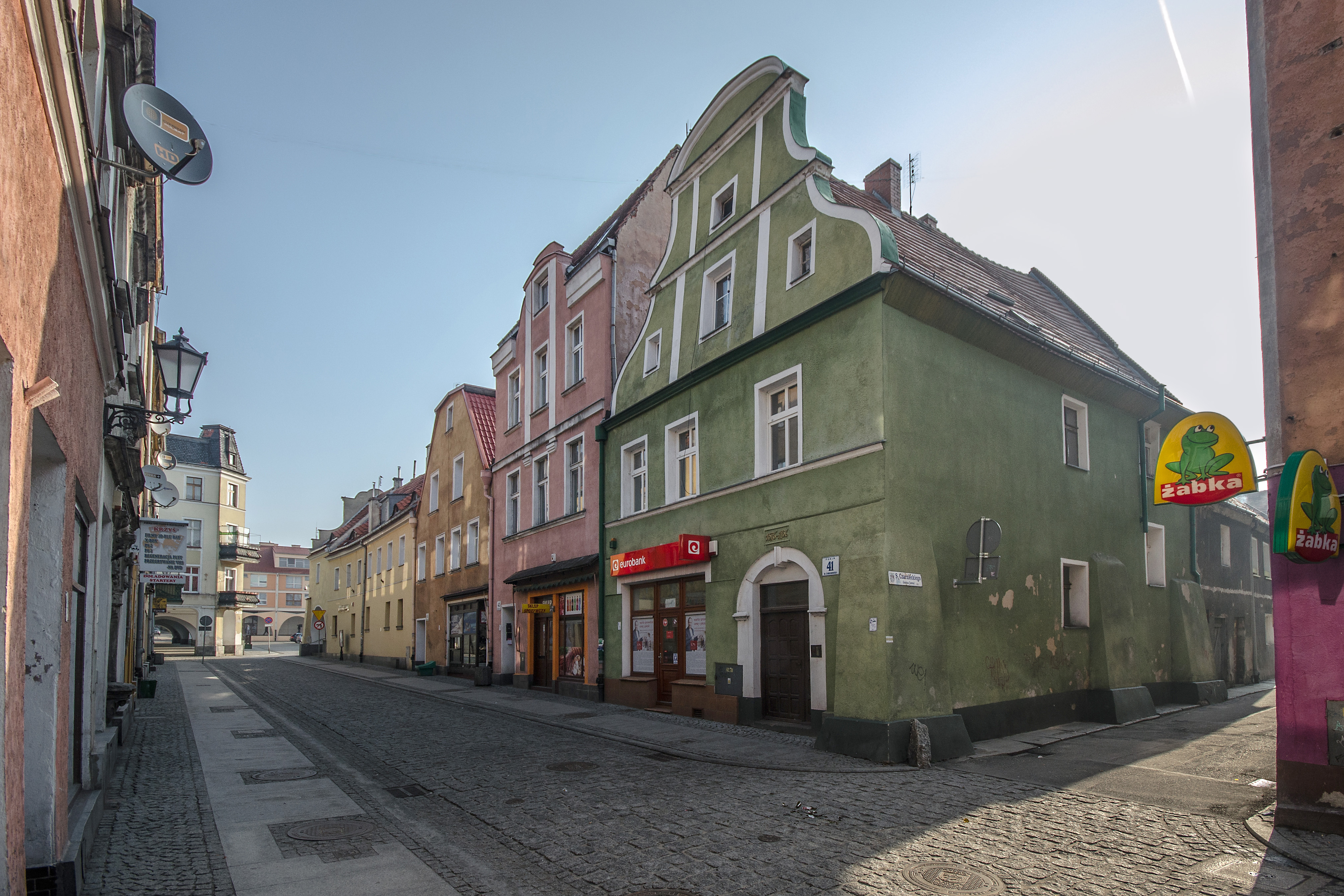
Chrobry Street in the Old Town

== Twin towns – sister cities ==
Jawor is twinned with:

- Berdychiv, Ukraine
- Niepołomice, Poland
- Niesky, Germany
- Roseto degli Abruzzi, Italy
- Turnov, Czech Republic
- Strassen, Luxembourg

== Notable people ==
- Nicholas Magni (1355–1435), theologian
- Christoff Rudolff (1499–1545), author of the first German textbook on algebra
- Heinrich Gottfried von Mattuschka (1734–1779), German botanist
- Wilhelm Ebstein (1836–1912), doctor who described the heart disorder Ebstein's anomaly
- Gerhard Bersu (1889–1964), German archeologist
- Max Otto Koischwitz (1902–1944), Nazi propagandist
- Heinz Finke (1920–1996), German officer
- Janusz Krasoń (born 1956), Polish politician
- Elżbieta Witek (born 1957), Polish politician, Marshal of Sejm (since 2019)
- Aleksander Śliwka, (born 1995), Polish volleyball player

The surname "Jaworski," meaning someone whose ancestors had ties to Jawor, is a fairly common surname both in Poland itself, and among Polish emigres to such countries as the United States. Examples include Leon Jaworski and Ron Jaworski.
