= Janusz Krasoń =

Polish politician (born 1956)

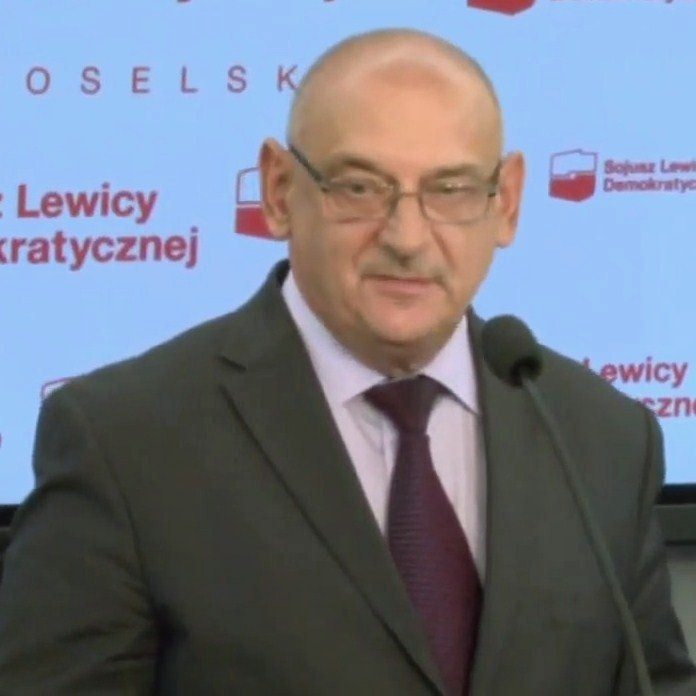

Member of the Sejm
- In office 19 October 2001 – 7 November 2011
- Constituency: 3 – Wrocław

Personal details
- Born: 1956 (age 69–70)
- Party: Democratic Left Alliance

Janusz Mirosław Krasoń (pronounced [ˈjanuʂ ˈkrasɔɲ]; born 15 September 1956 in Jawor) is a Polish politician. He was elected to the Sejm on 25 September 2005, getting 15,162 votes in 3 Wrocław district as a candidate from the Democratic Left Alliance list.

He was also a member of Sejm 2001-2005.

== See also ==
- Members of Polish Sejm 2005-2007
