= Heinrich Gottfried von Mattuschka =

German botanist

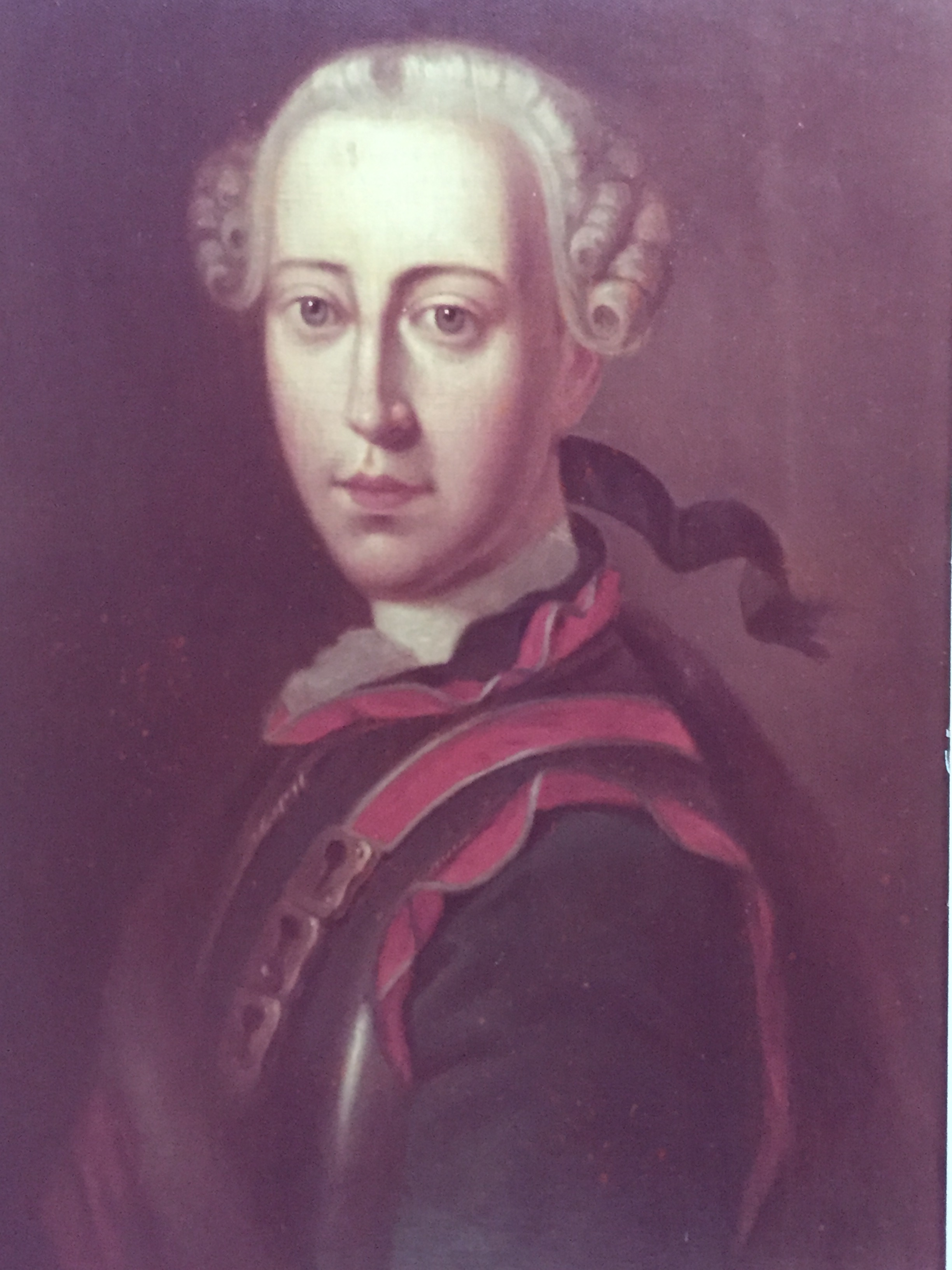

Heinrich Gottfried von Mattuschka (22 February 1734 in Jauer [now Jawor, Poland] – 9 November 1779 in Pitschen [now Pyszcsyn, Poland]) was a German botanist.

He wrote Flora silesiaca, and named many plants, notably Quercus petraea.
