= Jawor Castle =

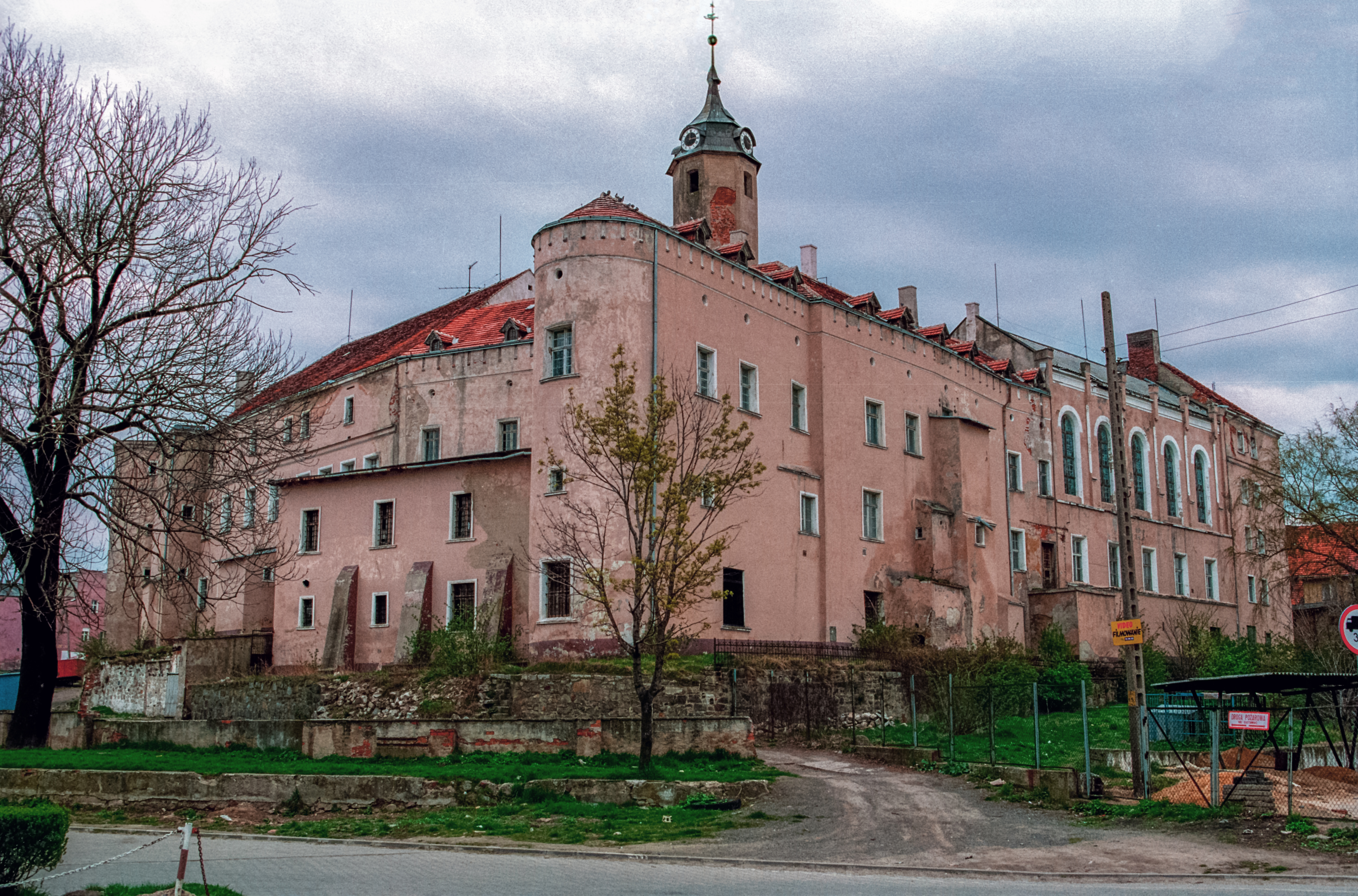
- Jawor Castle

- Location of the Jawor Castle in Poland Jawor Castle (Lower Silesian Voivodeship)
- 51°02′59″N 16°11′26″E
- Location: Jawor, Lower Silesian Voivodeship; in Poland

History
- Built: 12th century
- Demolished: 17th century
- Rebuilt: 17th century

Site notes
- Area: 6,072 m^{2} (65,360 sq ft)
- Governing body: Jawor

Jawor Castle (Polish: Zamek w Jaworze, German: Schloss Jauer) is a castle in Jawor, Poland.

The first castle was a wooden stronghold; later, Duke Bolesław the Tall built a stone tower house.

The castle has been a seat of both the Piast dynasty and the Duchy of Jawor-Świdnica. Several politically significant events took place in the castle during the Middle Ages. In 1648, the castle saw damage when it was besieged by soldiers loyal to the Holy Roman Empire, but it was renovated later during the same century (1663–65). Another renovation was carried out in 1705, when the clock tower was repaired.

Later during the 18th century, Frederick the Great converted the castle into a prison, a role which it would keep until 1956. Until 1821, it also housed an asylum for mentally ill. After 1888, the hitherto all-male prison became an all-female prison, and stayed in this capacity until 1945. During World War II, it was used as such also by the German authorities who among others imprisoned several French women here. A memorial commemorating them has been erected in the castle courtyard. After 1945, it housed political prisoners and former soldiers of the Home Army.

== Gallery ==
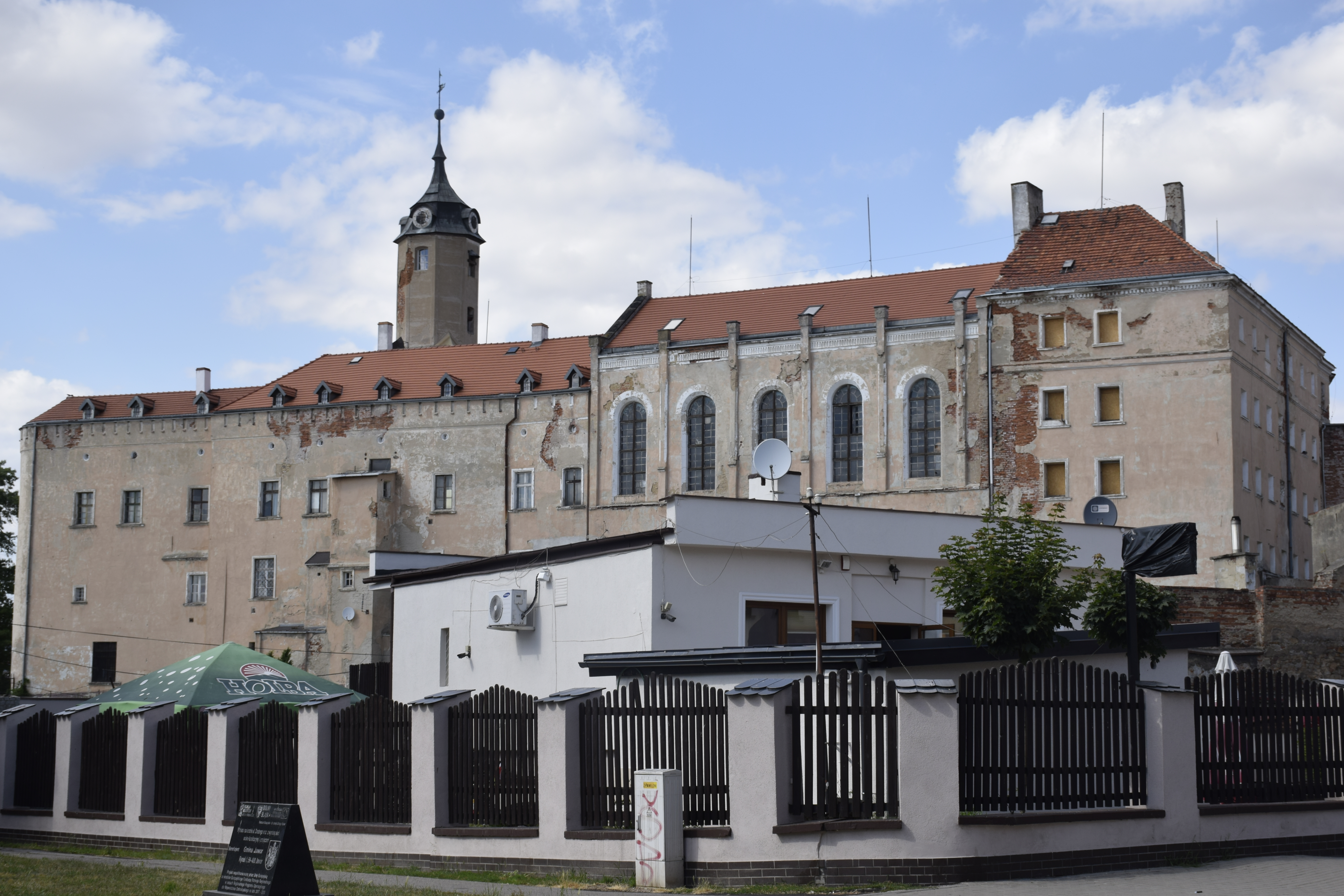
Castle as seen from the river

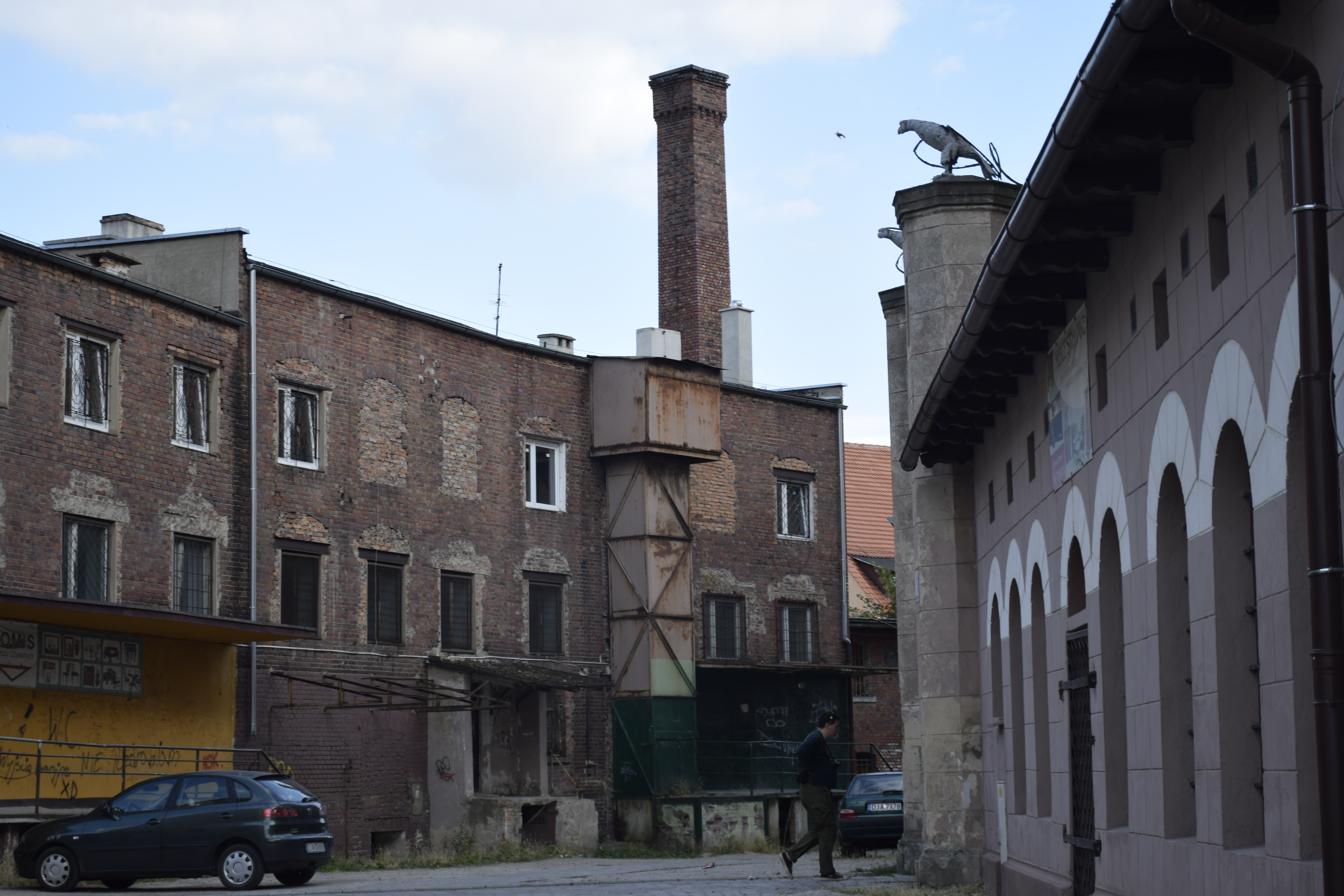
Industrial background

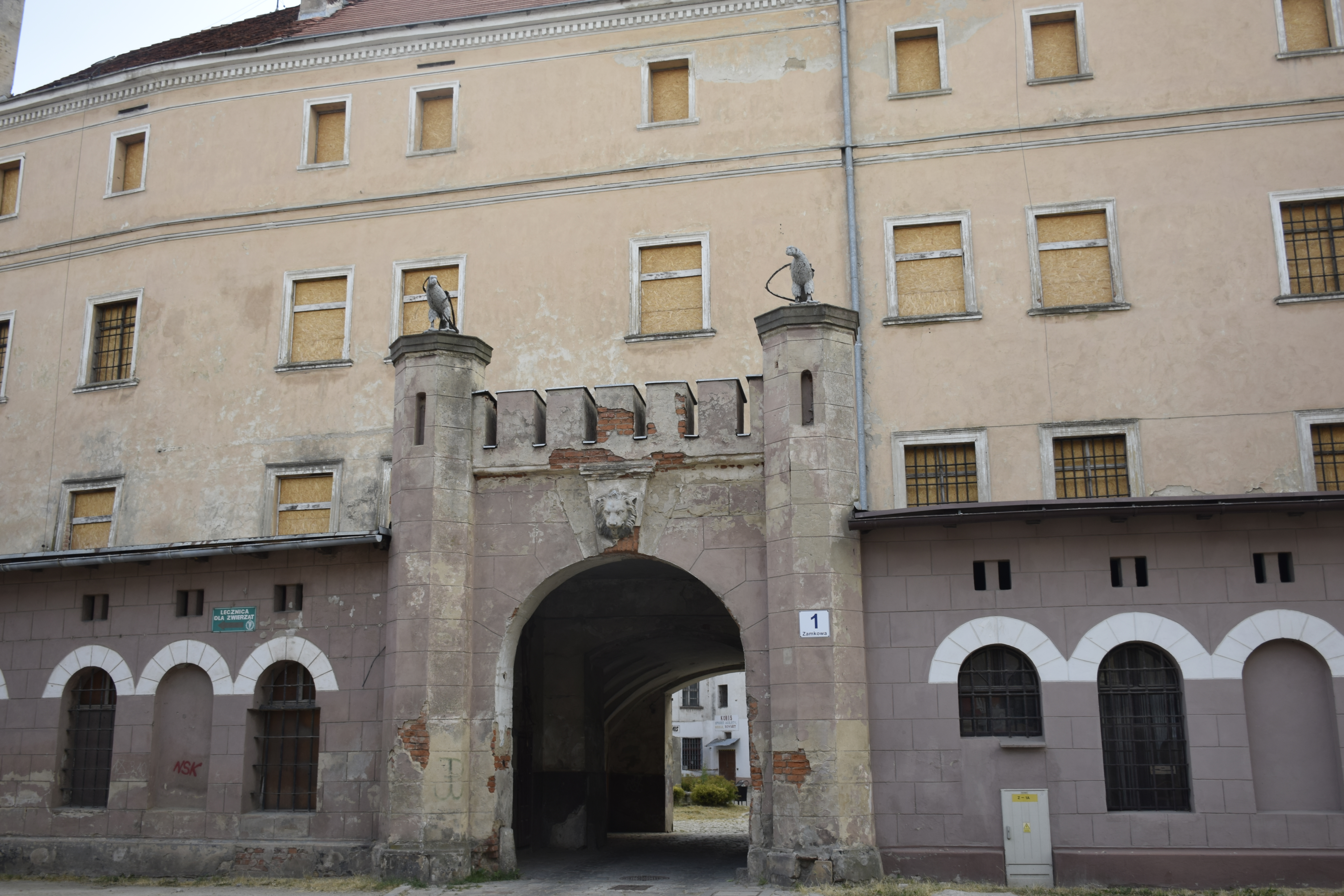
Main gate

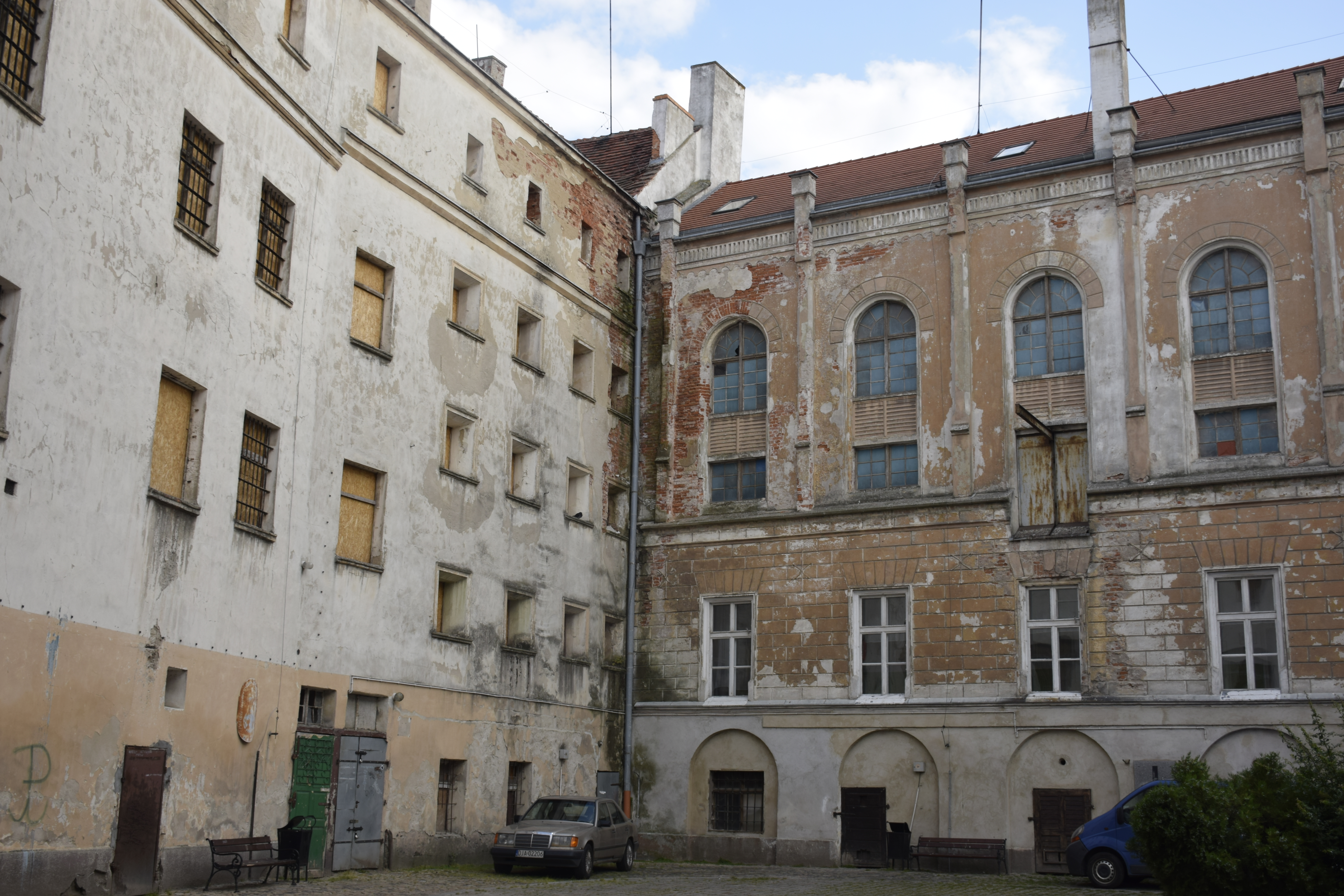
One side of the courtyard (2019)

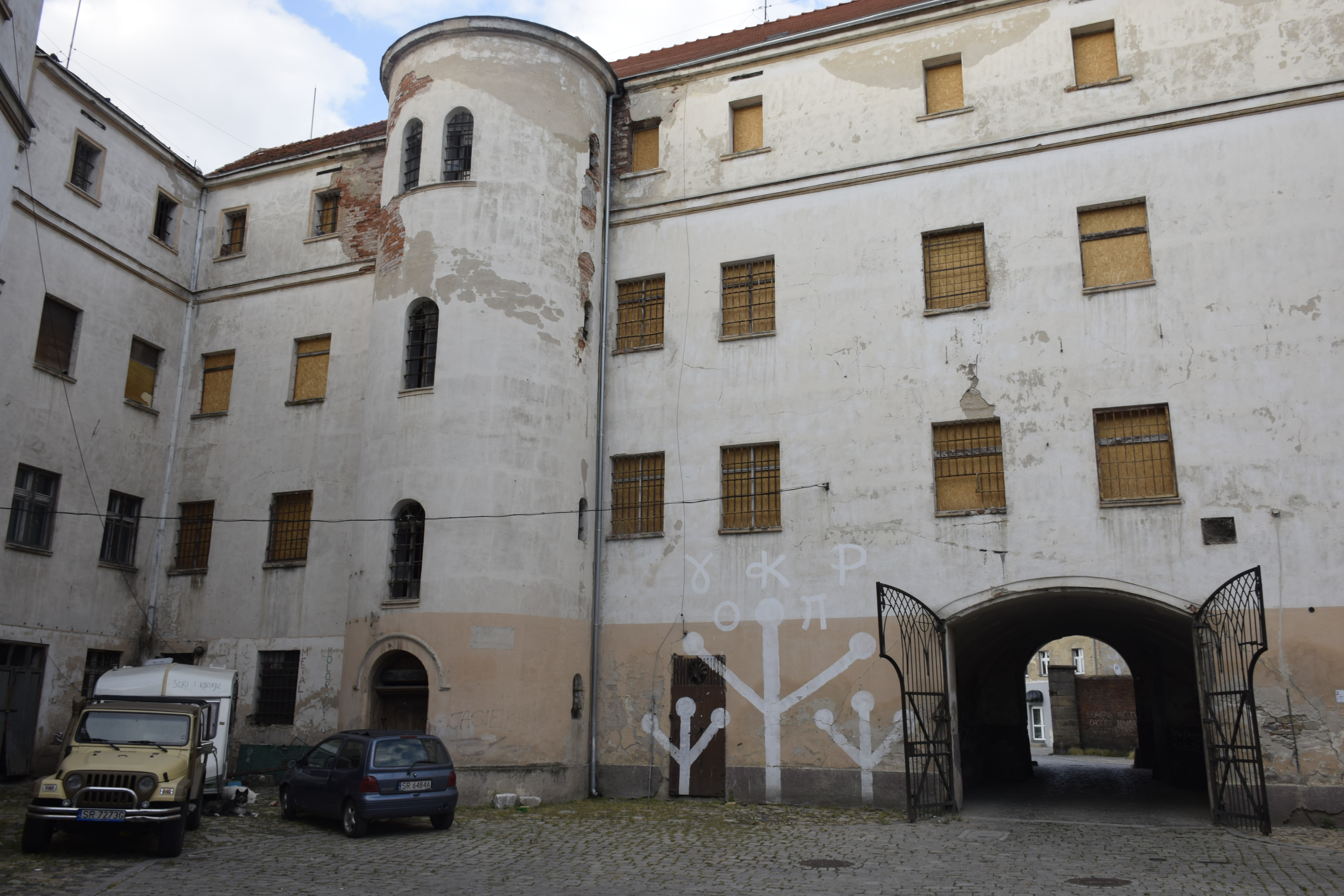
Other side of the courtyard (2019)
