= Nicholas Magni =

Nicholas Magni (Nicolaus Magni de Iawor, Mikuláš Magni z Jawora, Nikolaus Groß von Jauer) (c. 1355 – 22 March 1435) was a late medieval theologian, a professor at Prague University and Heidelberg University.

== Life ==
Born in Jawor, Silesia, he studied in Vienna (until 1377) and in Prague (1378-), where he lived in a Polish college and represented Polish nation. He studied under professor Matthew of Krakow (from 1378, baccalaureus 1392, magister artium 1395). Before 1392 he received priestly ordination. From 1392 he served as a priest of St. Gallus Church in Prague - Old Town, from about 1395 he started with lectures on theology from 1397 as a professor of theology and rector of Prague University. In 1402, he went to Heidelberg, where he was likewise made rector in 1406. He also represented the university at the Council of Constance 1414–1418, where he argued for a reform of the Church and the clergy.

His 1405 Tractatus de supersticionibus enjoyed great popularity throughout the 15th century, and survives in 80 manuscripts, but its influence did not extend beyond the end of the century, being superseded by the 1487 Malleus maleficarum, and was never printed.

== Works ==
- Sermo super quattuor passionibus D.N. Iesu Christi (Prague sermons)
- Reformist sermons of Constance, Obsecro vos ego, 3 October 1417
- German sermons Vom Gebet Von der Liebe Gottes (Basle 1434)
- Lectura super psalmis
- De tribus substancialibus votis religiosorum
- Quaestio de mendicantibus (against Beguines and Beghards)
- Quaestio de usuris
- Tractatus de supersticionibus (1405)
- Dialogus super sacra communione contra Hussitas
- Quaestio de hereticis
- Contra epistolam perfidiae Hussitarum

== Literature ==
- Josef Tříška (Ed.), Repertorium biographicum universitatis Pragensis praehussiticae 1348-1409, Praha 1981, 406;
- Adolph Franz, Der Magister Nikolaus Magni de Jawor, Freiburg 1898 1898, online
- F.X. Bantle, "N. Magni de Jawor und Johannes Wenk im Lichte des Codex Mc. 31 der UB Tübingen," in: Scholastik 38, 1963, 536-554
- "St. Bylina, Licitum - illicitum, Mikolaj z Jawora," in: Kultura elitarna a kultura masowa w Polsce póünego óredniowiecza, Wroclaw 1978, 137-153
- Ansgar Frenken (1993). "Nikolaus Jauer, eigentl.: Nicolaus Magni de Jawor, Nikolaus Groß von Jauer". In Bautz, Traugott (ed.). Biographisch-Bibliographisches Kirchenlexikon (BBKL) (in German). Vol. 6. Herzberg: Bautz. cols. 888–889. ISBN 3-88309-044-1.
