= Franz Kaspar Lieblein =

German botanist

Franz Kaspar (or Caspar) Lieblein (15 September 1744 – 28 April 1810) was a German botanist, born at Karlstadt am Main on 15 September 1744. He is noted for his studies of the flora of Fulda in Hesse, and wrote Flora fuldensis in 1784, in which he described over 300 plant species found in the Rhön Mountains. He died at Fulda on 28 April 1810.
