= Coat of arms of Świdnica =

- Earliest mention: 1452

The coat of arms of Świdnica – is the coat of arms of the town of Świdnica.

== Appearance and symbolism ==
The coat of arms of the town is divided into four fields. On a quartered shield, in fields 1 and 4, there is a black crown on a black background, in field 2, there is a red griffin on a silver background, and in field 3, there is a black boar on a silver background.

== History ==
This coat of arms, which was used for the longest period in the town's history, refers to the old coat of arms of the Duchy of Świdnica. It was granted to the town of Świdnica in 1452 by the Czech king Ladislaus the Posthumous. At the same time, in 1452, the town council ordered a seal with a new coat of arms to be made, which was to be used on all important town documents. In 1501, the seal was modified. The seal reproduced the coat of arms in heraldic structure, i.e. a shield divided into four fields with images of ancient motifs: a griffin in field II, a boar in field III and a royal crown in the other two fields. This coat of arms remained in use until 1966, when the Municipal National Council in Świdnica introduced a new coat of arms for the city. It broke with the historical tradition of the coat of arms, as it depicted only a red griffin on a silver or white field. The coat of arms in this form was used until 1999. That year, the City Council passed a resolution to return to the original, historical coat of arms of the city.

== Gallery ==
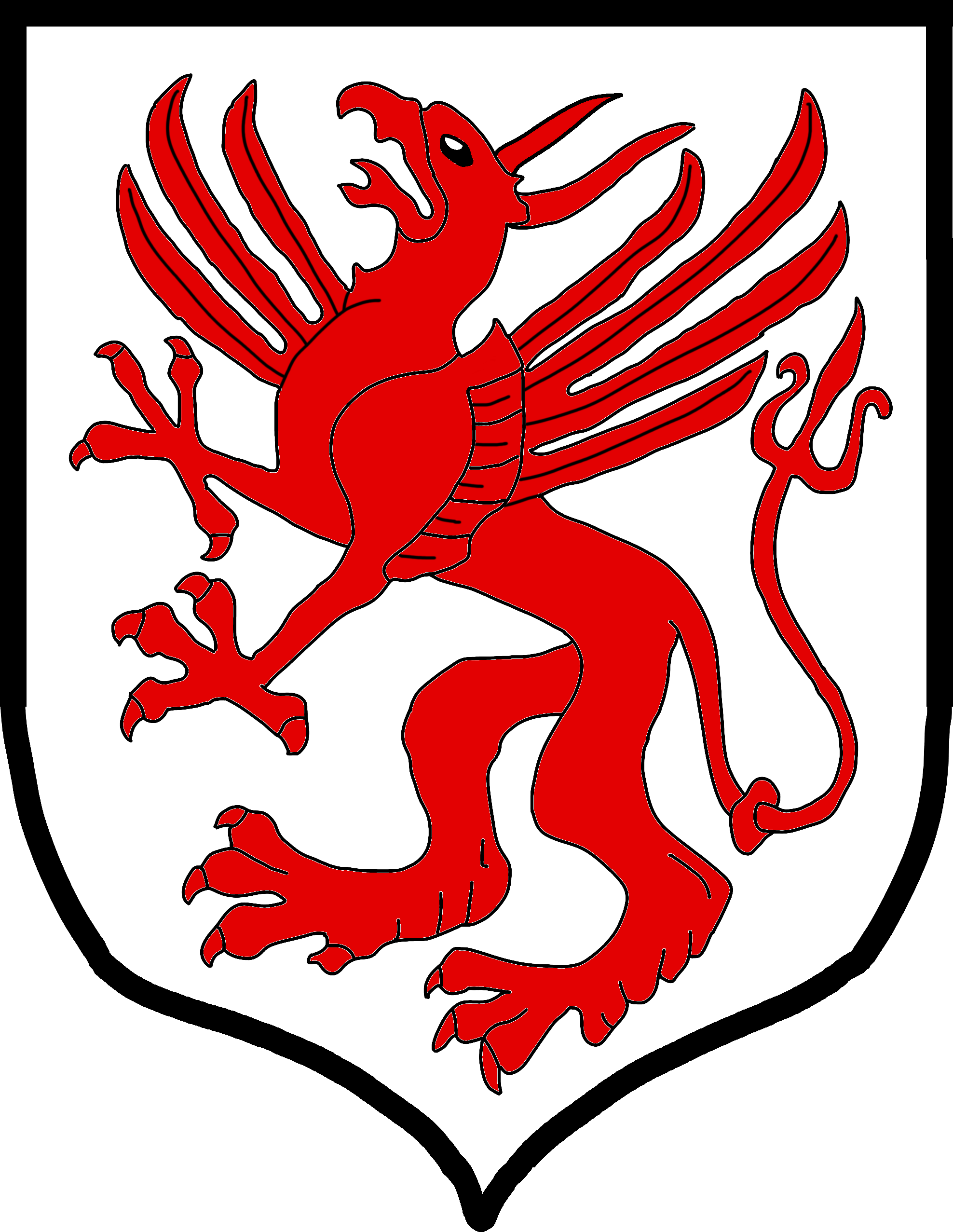
Coat of arms of Świdnicy from 1966-1999.

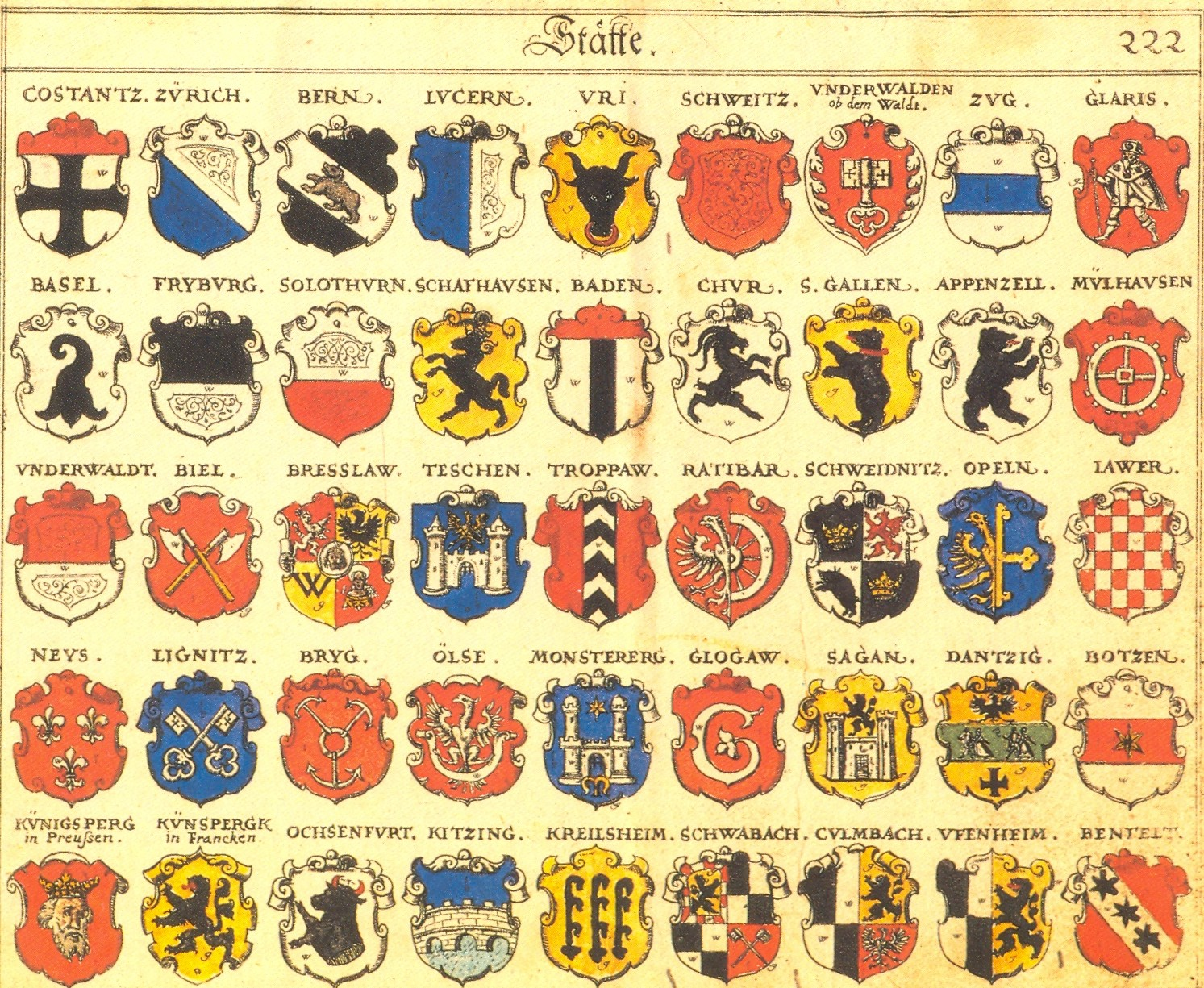
Coat of arms of Świdnicy in the armorial of Johann Siebmach (seventh from the left in the third row).

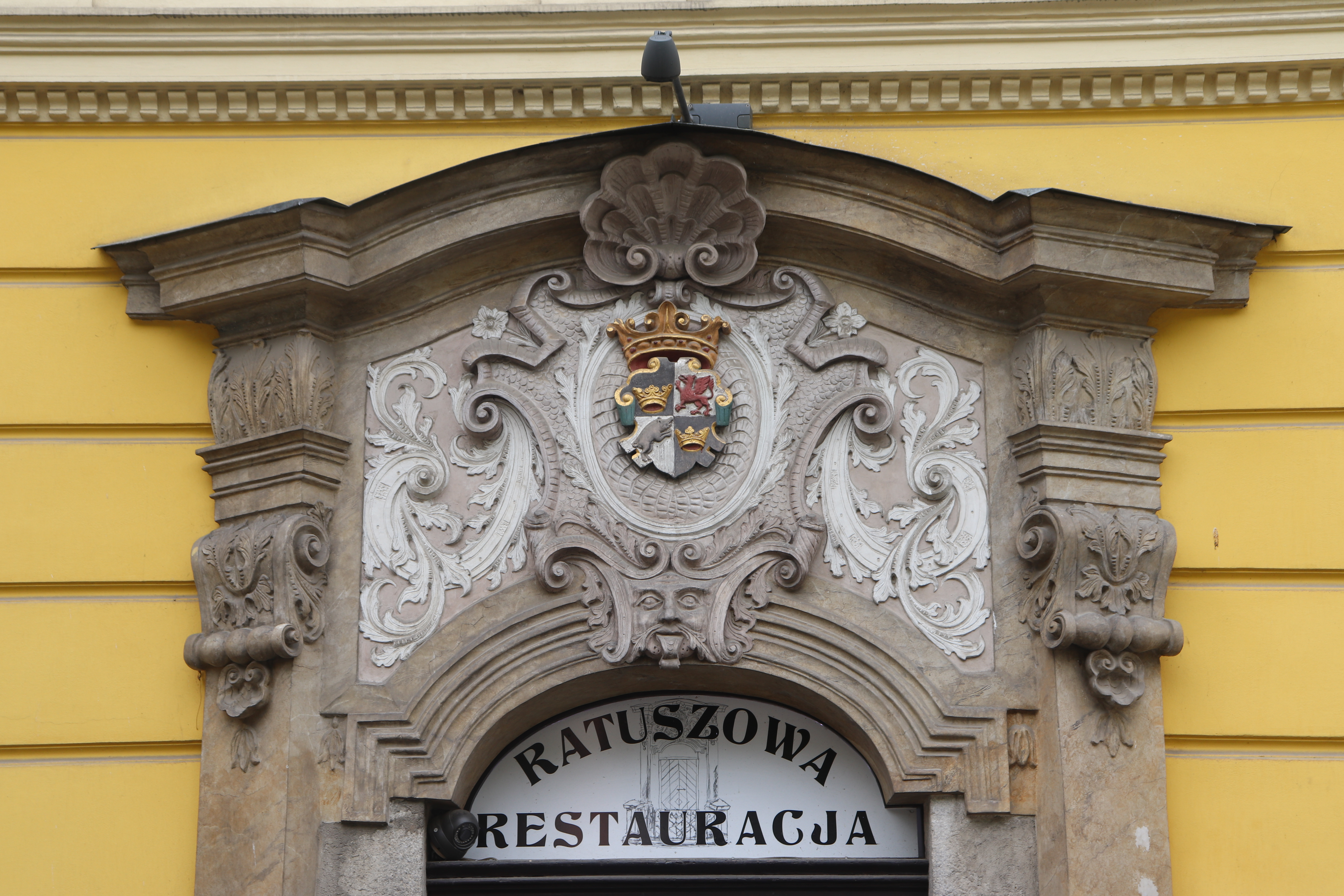
The coat of arms of Świdnica on the portal of the tenement house at 37 Market Square.

== See also ==
- Świdnica
