= Clara Jaschke =

Prussian-German railway worker and activist

- Born: Clara Berta Anna Jaschke either 1848 or 1858; Schweidnitz, Silesia
- Died: 3 January 1912 (aged 53-64); Lichtenberg, Berlin
- Occupation(s): One of Prussia and Germany's first women railway workers, campaigner for women's rights

Clara Berta Anna Jaschke (either 1848 or 1858 - 3 January 1912) was one of Prussia and Germany's first women railway workers and a campaigner for women's rights.

== Early life ==
Clara Berta Anna Jaschke, known as Clara (sometimes spelled Klara), was born in either 1848 or 1858 in Schweidnitz, Silesia, (now Świdnica in Poland) the daughter of a stationmaster employed by the Berlin-Anhalt Railway Company, which meant that she was familiar with railway work from a young age. Women were only allowed to work in certain support roles on the German railway at the time. From 1870, unmarried women (often from railway families) were employed as telegraphists and ticket sellers. The pay for women was lower than for men, and women were only paid and employed on a daily basis, rather than on a proper contact.

== Career ==
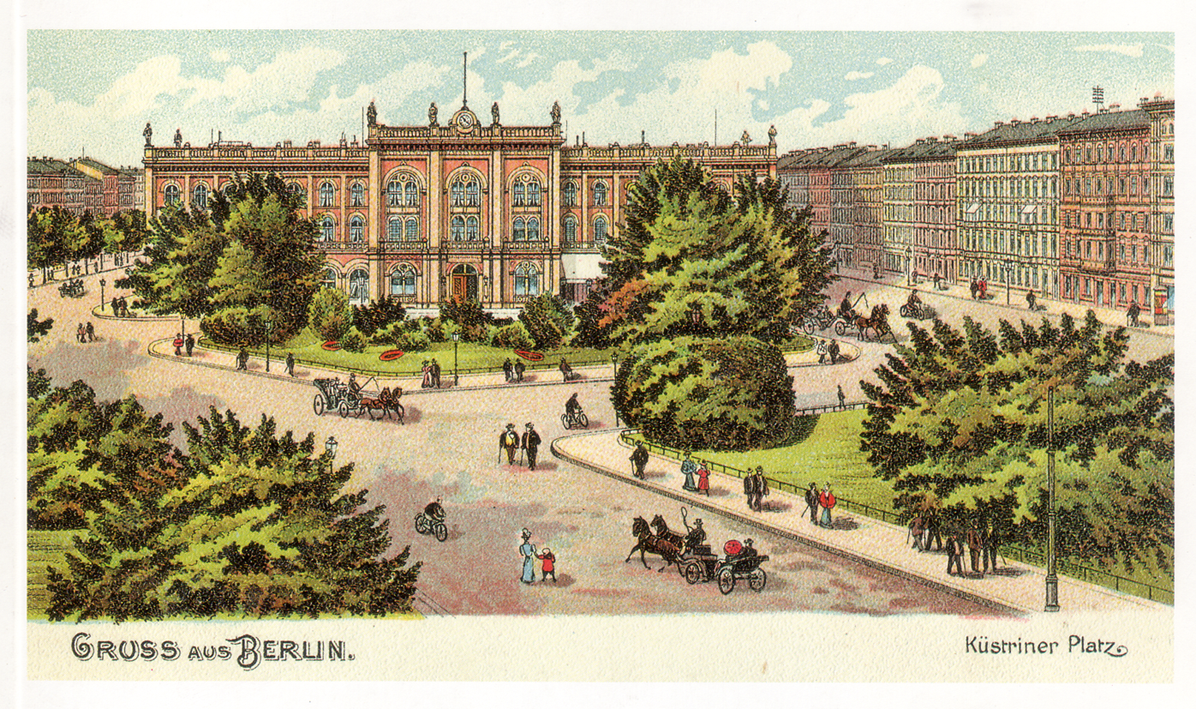
Station building at Küstriner Platz, postcard (c. 1900)

Sometime between 1873 and 1875 Jaschke began working as a ticket seller at the Schlesischer Bahnhof (Old Berlin-Ostbahnhof), making her one of the first four women to work for the railways in what was then Prussia. In 1880 most of the Prussian state railways were nationalised, which made contracted male staff state employees or civil servants. Women were not allowed to work directly on the railways, being relegated to lower grade, day rate office based work. The low pay of a daily worker was insufficient for the women colleagues to live on. Jaschke felt that this low pay and insecure employment rights in comparison to men's pay for equal work was unfair, and she began a campaign for equal rights between men and women.

== Campaign for women's employment rights on the railway ==
In 1882 an occupational census shows that 1,302 women were employed in the state and private railway service. Jaschke began to work with others who wanted equal rights on the railways. In 1898, after almost 25 years working in the profession, she and other women colleagues drew up a petition, demanding that railway workers be employed on a salaried basis. This ultimately received approval in the Preußischen Staatseisenbahnen (Prussian House of Representatives). As a result, the first civil service positions for women are created in 1898, and women could work for the railways as Beamtinnen (permanent civil servants) which brought with it an element of job and economic security. It is unclear whether Jaschke herself achieved a permanent position with the Prussian State Railways.

From 1904 onwards the job title of Eisenbahngehilfin (railway assistant) was created, although it was a role without any possibility of promotion. The job required the completion of secondary school education or a similar examination qualification. The women railway assistants were on the same scale as male workers who were wagon guards or conductors. The women were expected to work between 42 and 60 hours per week, including Sundays and night duties. The considerably lower pay compared to male colleagues remained, as did the so-called civil servant celibacy, which stipulated that female civil servants had to be dismissed after marriage, This rule was only abolished when the Weimar Constitution came into force on 11 August 1919.

== Later life ==
Clara Jaschke died 1912 in Lichtenberg in Berlin.

== Commemoration ==
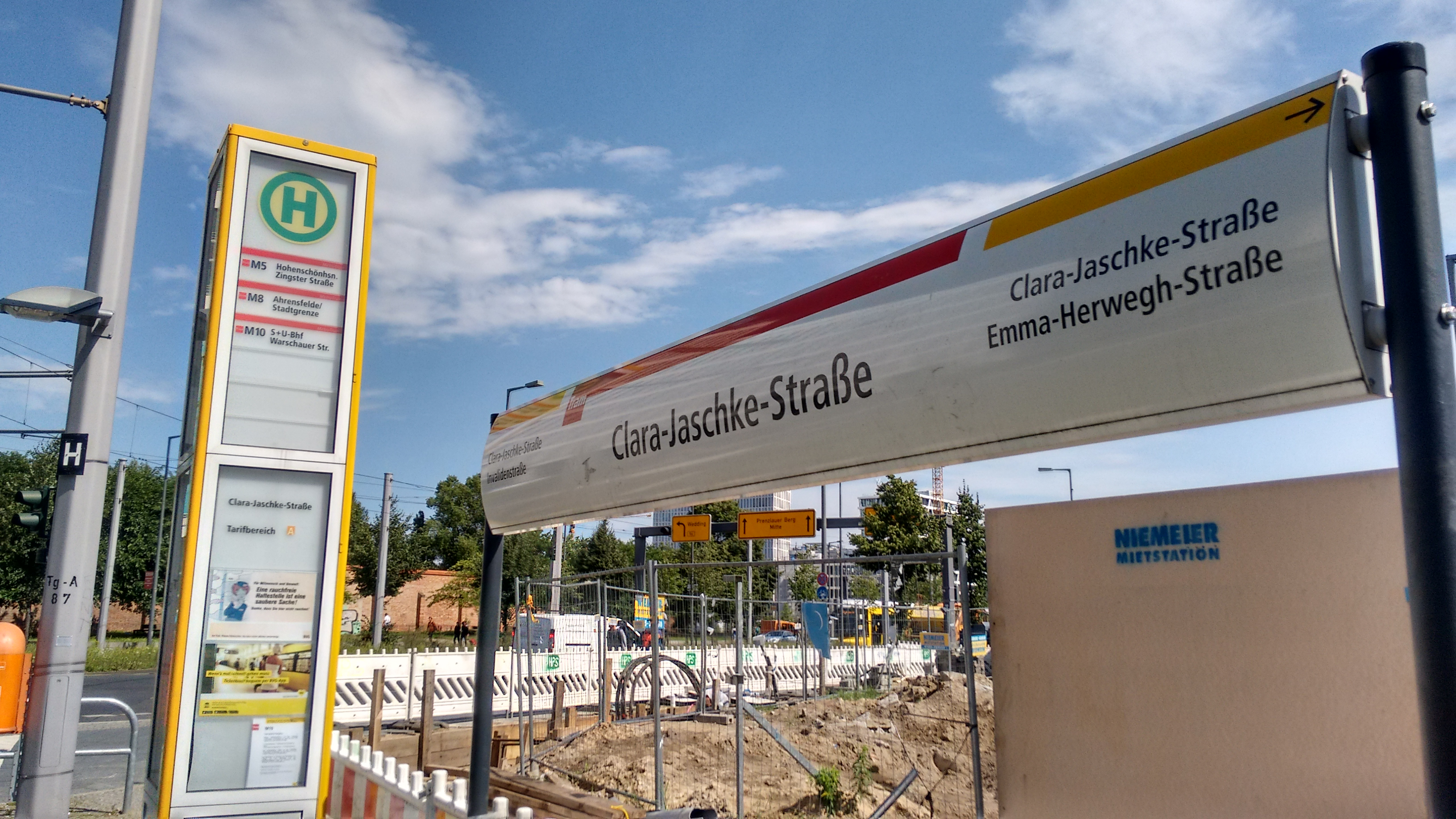
Clara-Jaschke-Straße tram stop, Berlin-Moabit

In 2005, Clara-Jaschke-Straße, a street near the Berliner Hauptbahnhofs (Berlin's main railway station which opened in 2006) in Berlin-Moabit, was named after her.

In 2018, the Pro-Rail Alliance introduced an annual Clara Jaschke Innovation Award, which recognises achievements by women in the rail industry.

In 2022, the council of Bad Zwischenahn in Lower Saxony decided to name a new road after Clara Jaschke in a commercial area of the Bauerschaft Aschhausen not far from the Kayhauserfeld service station on the Oldenburg-Leer railway line.
