= Albert Kretschmer =

German painter (1825–1891)

- Born: 27 February 1825; Schweidnitz, Silesia Province, Prussia (now Świdnica Poland)
- Died: 11 July 1891 (aged 66); Berlin, German Empire (now Germany)
- Education: Carl Joseph Begas, Akademie der Künste
- Known for: Painting, costume design

Albert Kretschmer (27 February 1825 – 11 July 1891) was a German professor, painter, costumes researcher and chairman of Schauspielhaus Berlin.

== Life and work ==
Kretschmer moved to Berlin in 1842 and studied under Professor Carl Joseph Begas at the Prussian Academy of Arts. He lived in Friedrichstadt, Behrenstraße 8 and was father of historic geographer Konrad Kretschmer and Indo-European linguist Paul Kretschmer.

Kretschmer was renowned for his detailed drawings, watercolor paintings and lithographs and their appearance in publications on German and international Tracht as well as historic fashion.

Furthermore, Kretschmer worked as a costume designer at Schauspielhaus Berlin until 1889.

== Selected works ==
- Das große Buch der Volkstrachten (in German) (2 ed.). Leipzig: Bach. 1890.
- Rohrbach, Carl (1906). Die Trachten der Völker. Vom Beginn der Geschichte bis zum 19. Jahrhundert. In 104 Tafeln zusammengestellt, gezeichnet und lithographiert von Albert Kretschmer, im Farbdruck ausgeführt von Franz Eugen Köhler, (Gera -Untermhaus) (in German) (3 ed.). Leipzig: Verlag Bibliographische Anstalt Adolph Schumann.

Illustrationen

- von Reinsberg-Düringsfeld, Ida; von Reinsberg, Otto (1871). Hochzeitsbuch: Brauch und Glaube bei den christlichen Völkern Europas, mit XXIV Illustrationen von Albert Kretschmer und einem symbolischen Titelbilde von Marie von Reichenbach. In Farbendruck ausgeführt von J. G. Bach in Leipzig (in German). Leipzig: J. G. Bach. urn:nbn:de:hbz:061:1-71430

=== Gallery ===
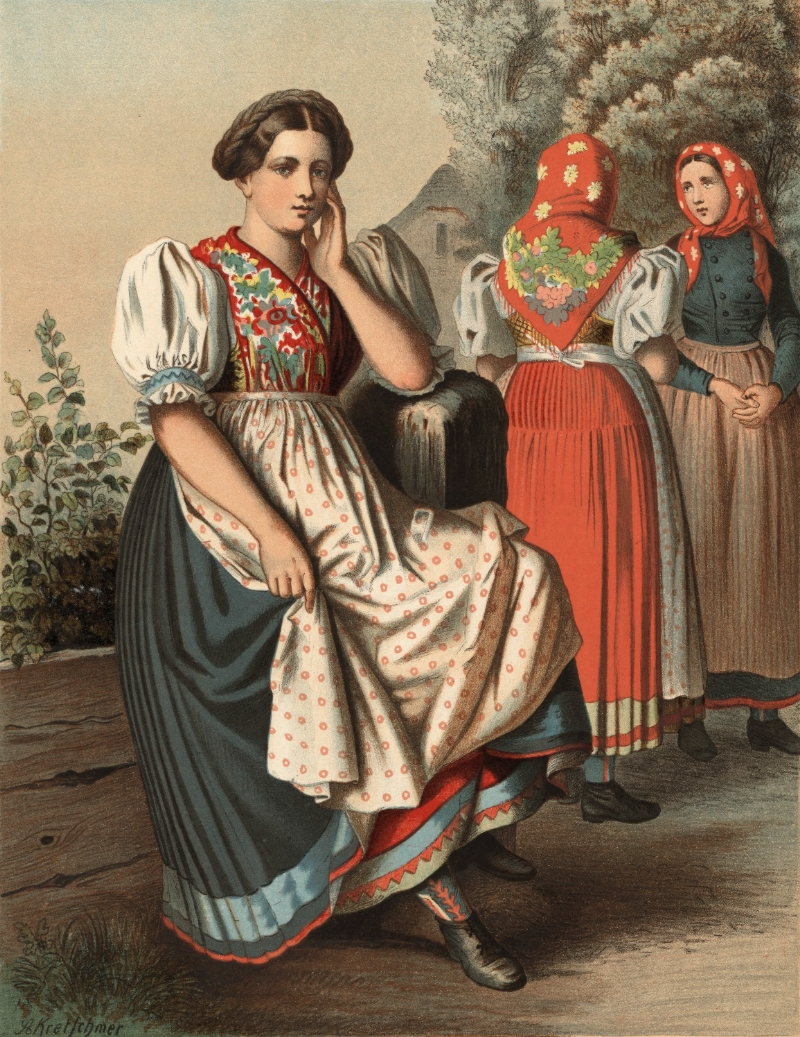
Silesian Tracht

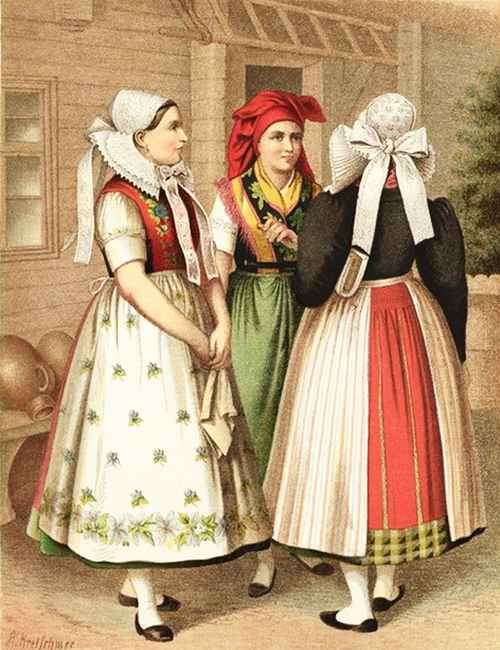
Prussian Tracht

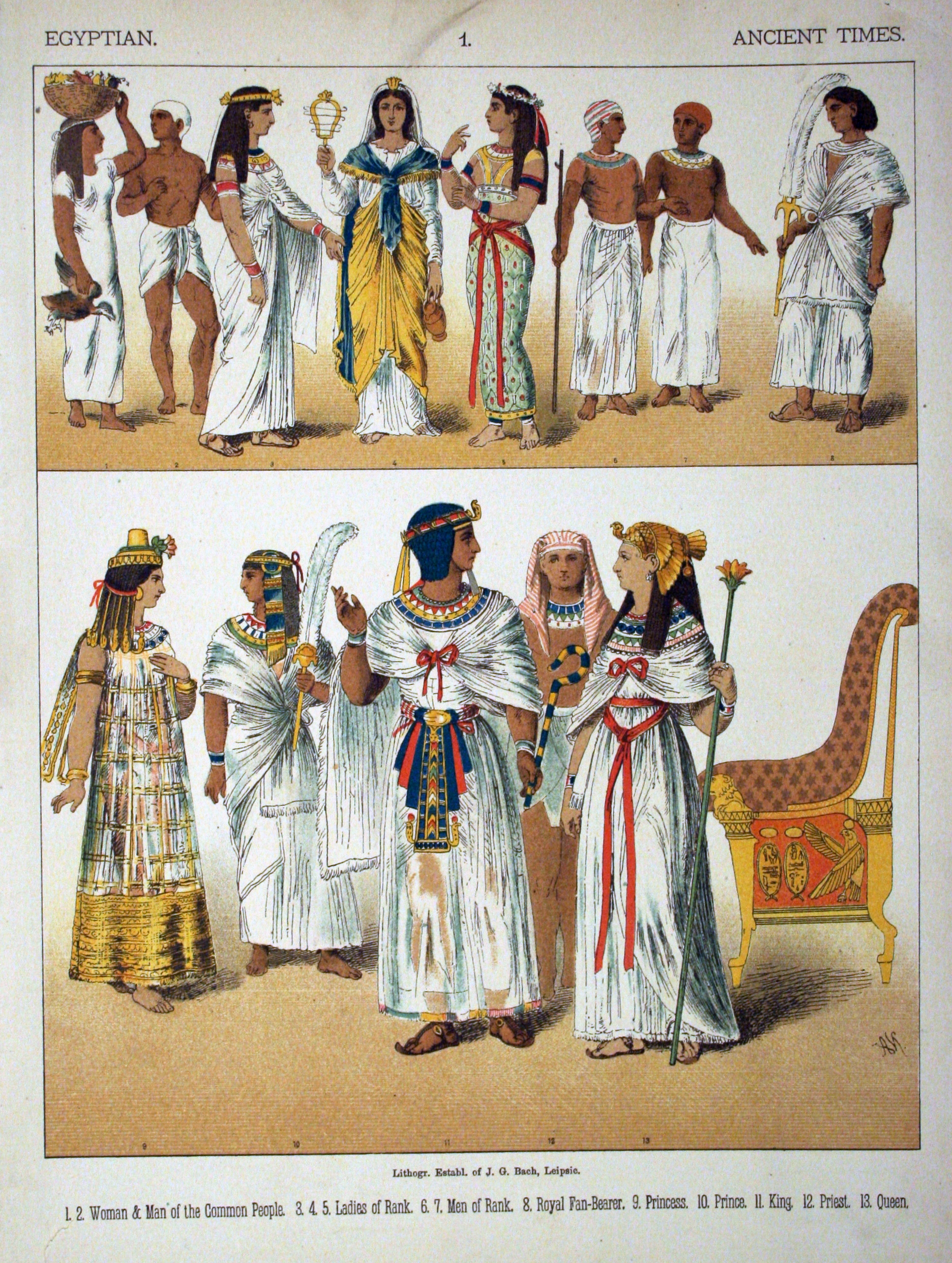
Antique Egyptian Tracht

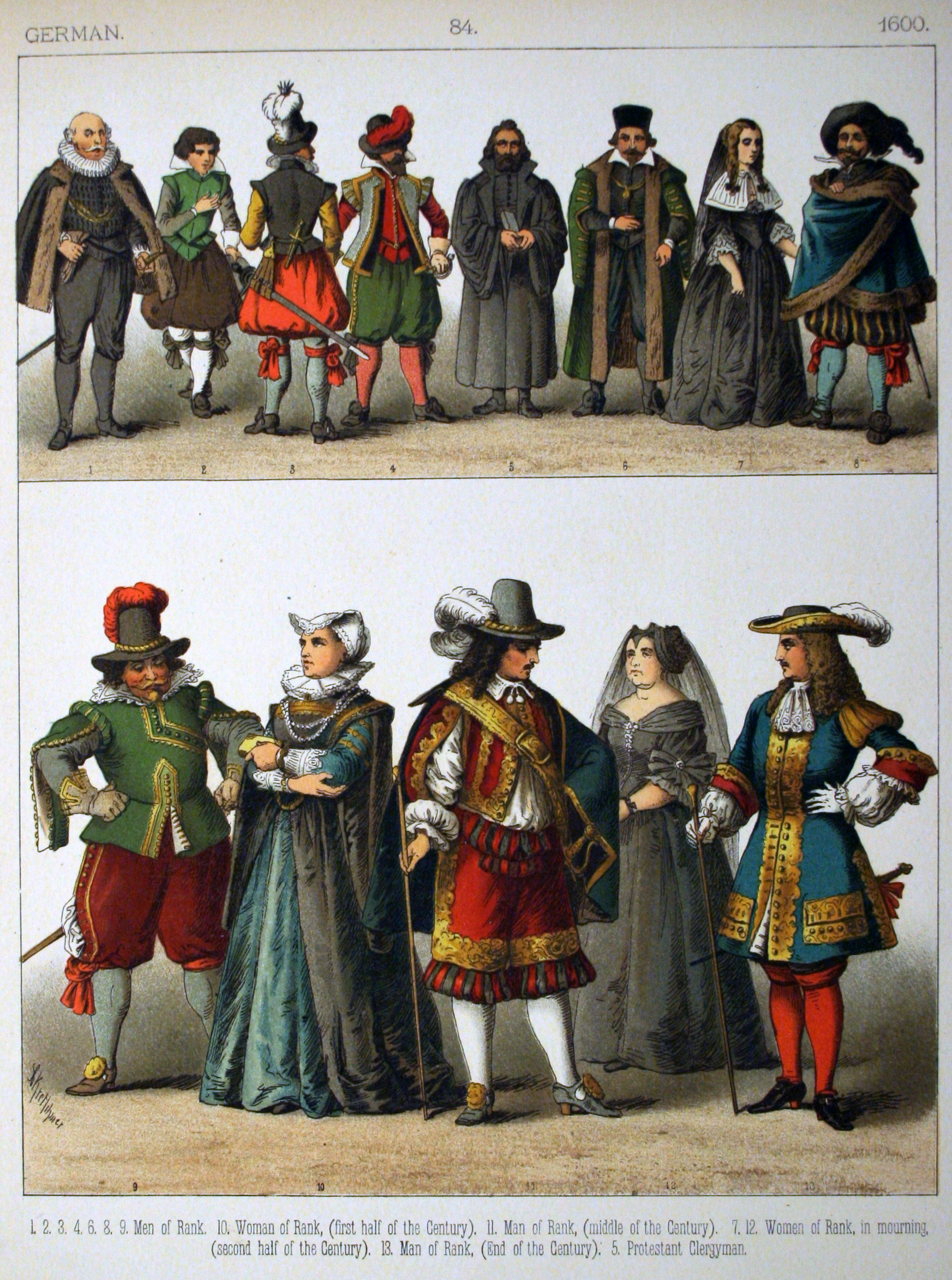
German Fashion 17th century

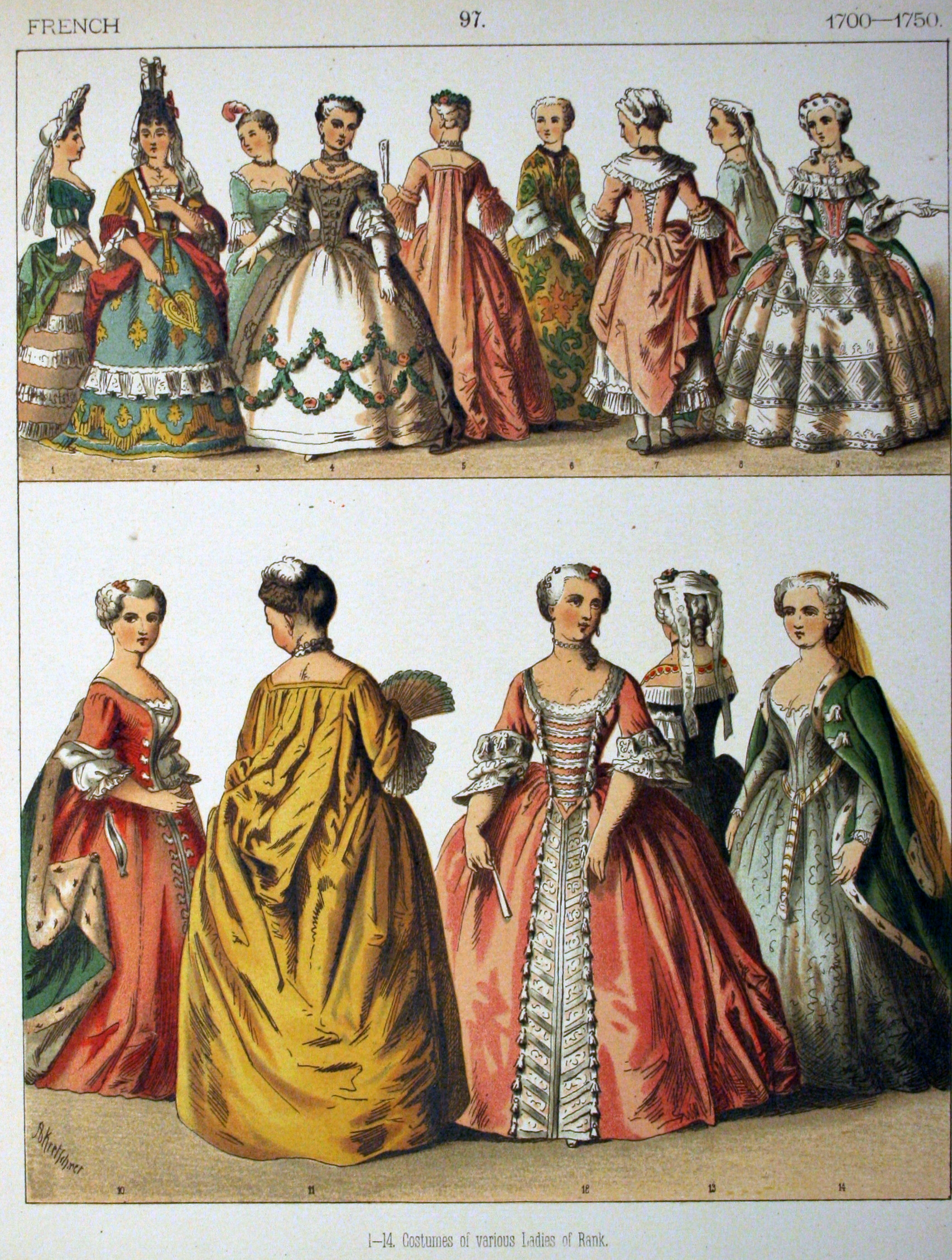
French Fashion 1750 - 1800
