= Diocese of Świdnica =

Roman Catholic diocese in Poland

Coordinates: 50°50′28″N 16°29′31″E

Diocese of Świdnica Dioecesis Suidniciensis Diecezja Świdnicka

Catholic
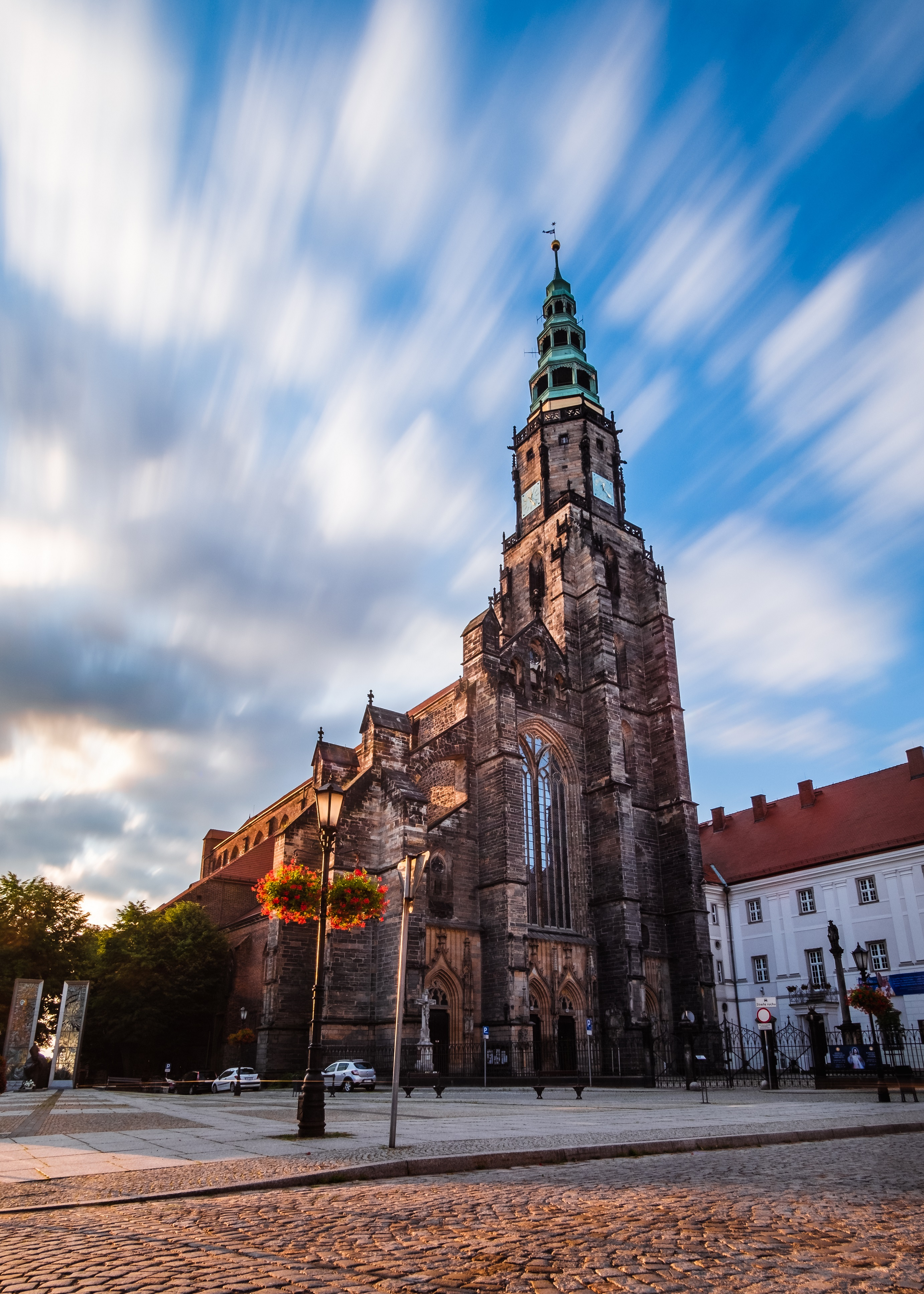
- Cathedral of Sts. Paul, Stanislaus and Wenceslaus in Świdnica

Location
- Country: Poland
- Ecclesiastical province: Wrocław
- Metropolitan: Wrocław

Statistics
- Area: 4,500 km^{2} (1,700 sq mi)
- Population: Total; Catholics: (as of 2020); 620,000; 525,720 (84.8%)

Information
- Denomination: Catholic Church
- Rite: Latin Rite
- Established: 24 February 2004
- Cathedral: (Cathedral of St. Stanislaus and St. Wenceslaus)

Current leadership
- Pope: Leo XIV
- Bishop: Marek Mendyk
- Metropolitan Archbishop: Józef Kupny
- Auxiliary Bishops: Adam Bałabuch

Map

Website
- Website of the Diocese

The Diocese of Świdnica (Latin: Dioecesis Suidniciensis) is a Latin Church diocese of the Catholic Church located in the city of Świdnica in the ecclesiastical province of Wrocław in Poland. In 2013 about 28.7% of the dioceses population attended a church on Sundays regularly according to the church statistics.

Its St. Stanislaus and St. Wenceslaus Cathedral in Świdnica is listed as a Historic Monument of Poland.

== History ==
The new diocese was created from the combination of 13 deaneries of the Archdiocese of Wroclaw and 8 deaneries of the Diocese of Legnica.

On February 24, 2004, John Paul II announced the election of Świdnica (from Nysa, Wałbrzych and Kłodzko) as the capital of the new diocese in Lower Silesia.

On March 19, 2008, Pope Benedict XVI appointed Adam Bałabuch, the first auxiliary bishop in the diocese.

On March 31, 2020 bishop Ignacy Dec retire and Pope Francis appointed Marek Mendyk as new diocesan bishop.

== Leadership ==
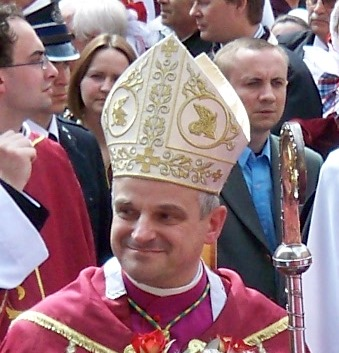
Bishop Marek Mendyk

- Bishops of Świdnica (Roman rite):
  - Bishop Ignacy Dec (February 24, 2004 – March 31, 2020)
  - Bishop Marek Mendyk (since April 24, 2020)
- Auxiliary bishop
  - Adam Bałabuch (since March 19, 2008)

== See also ==
- Roman Catholicism in Poland

== Sources ==
- GCatholic.org
- Catholic Hierarchy
- Diocese website
