= Świdnica =

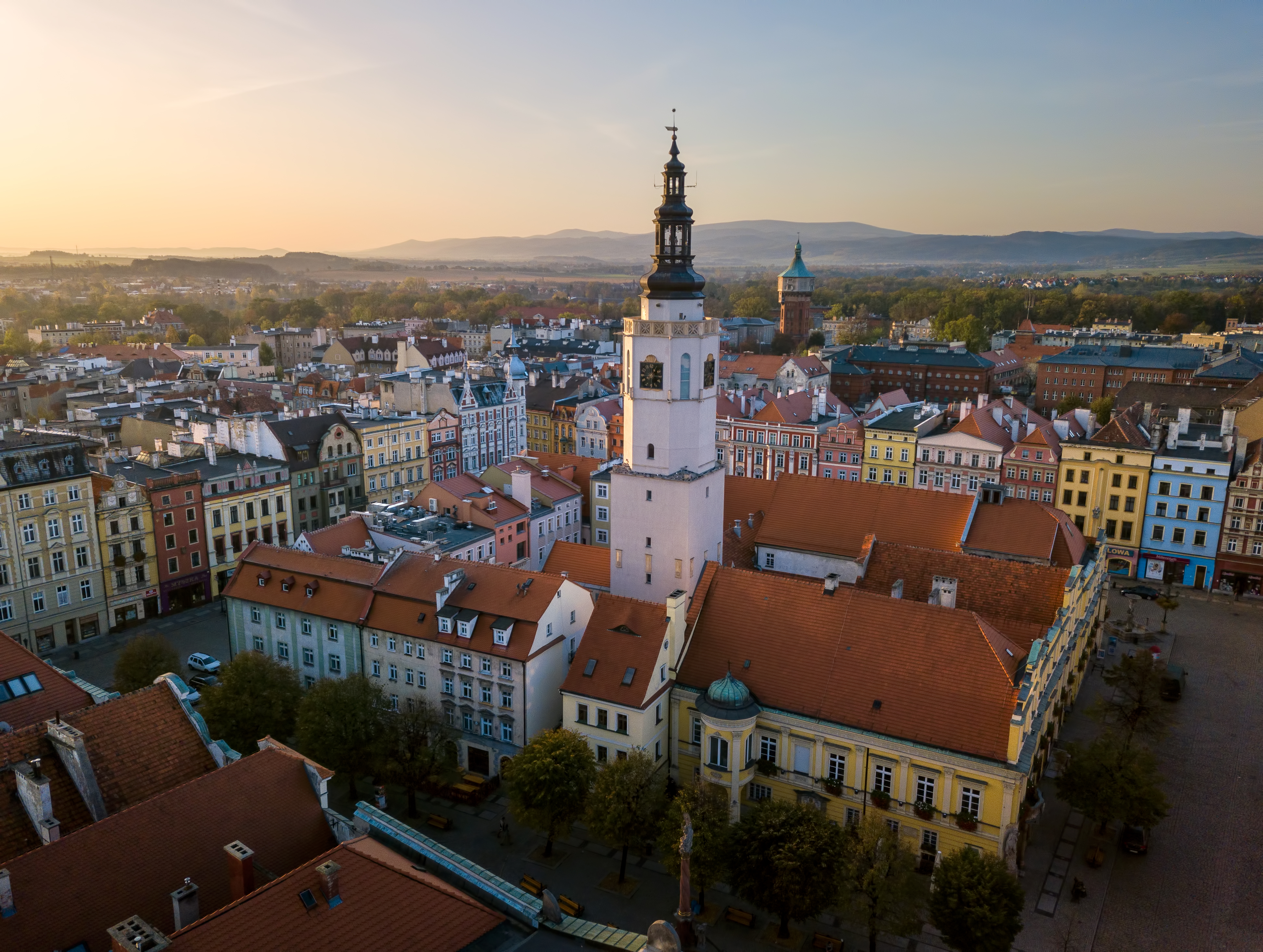
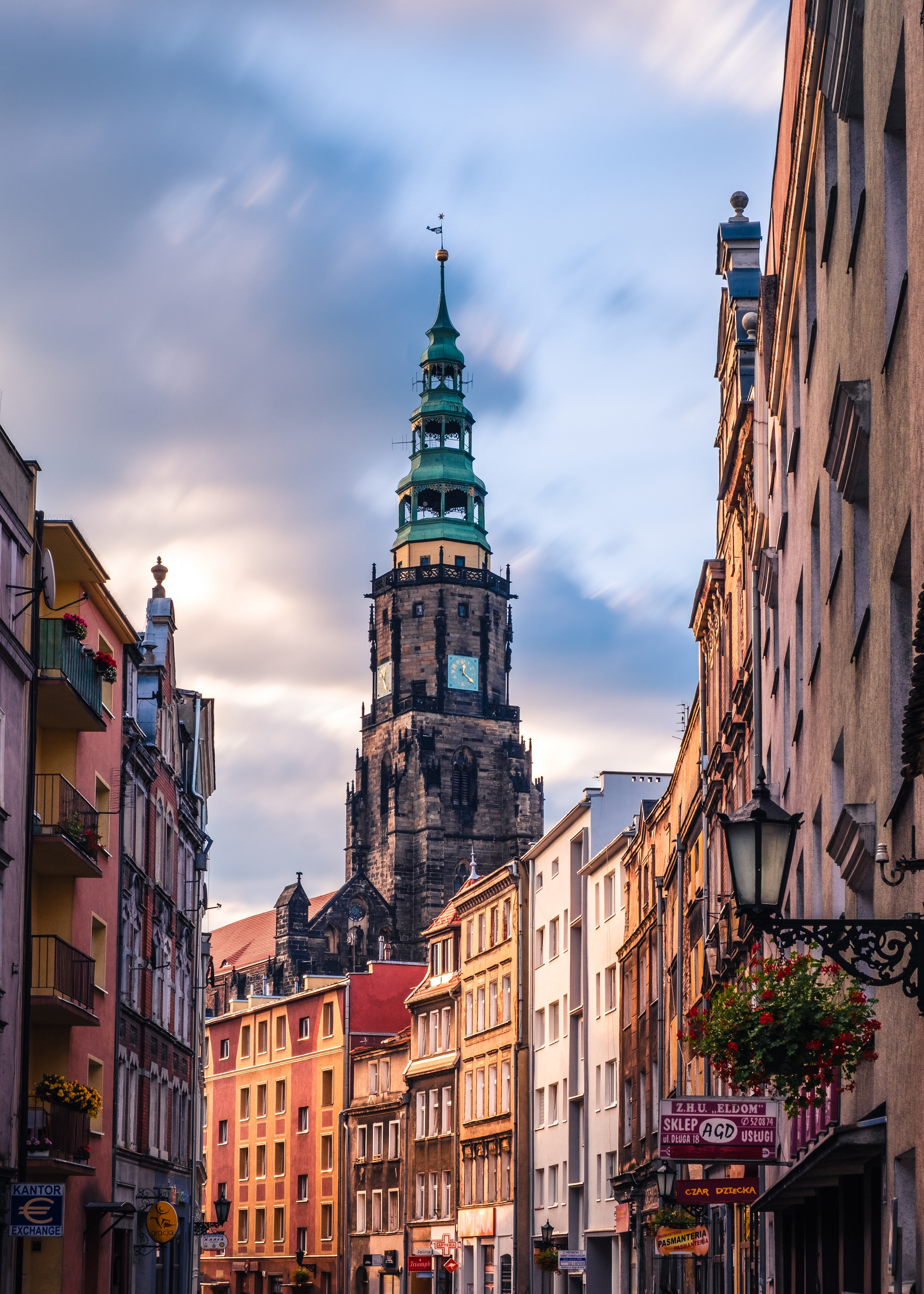
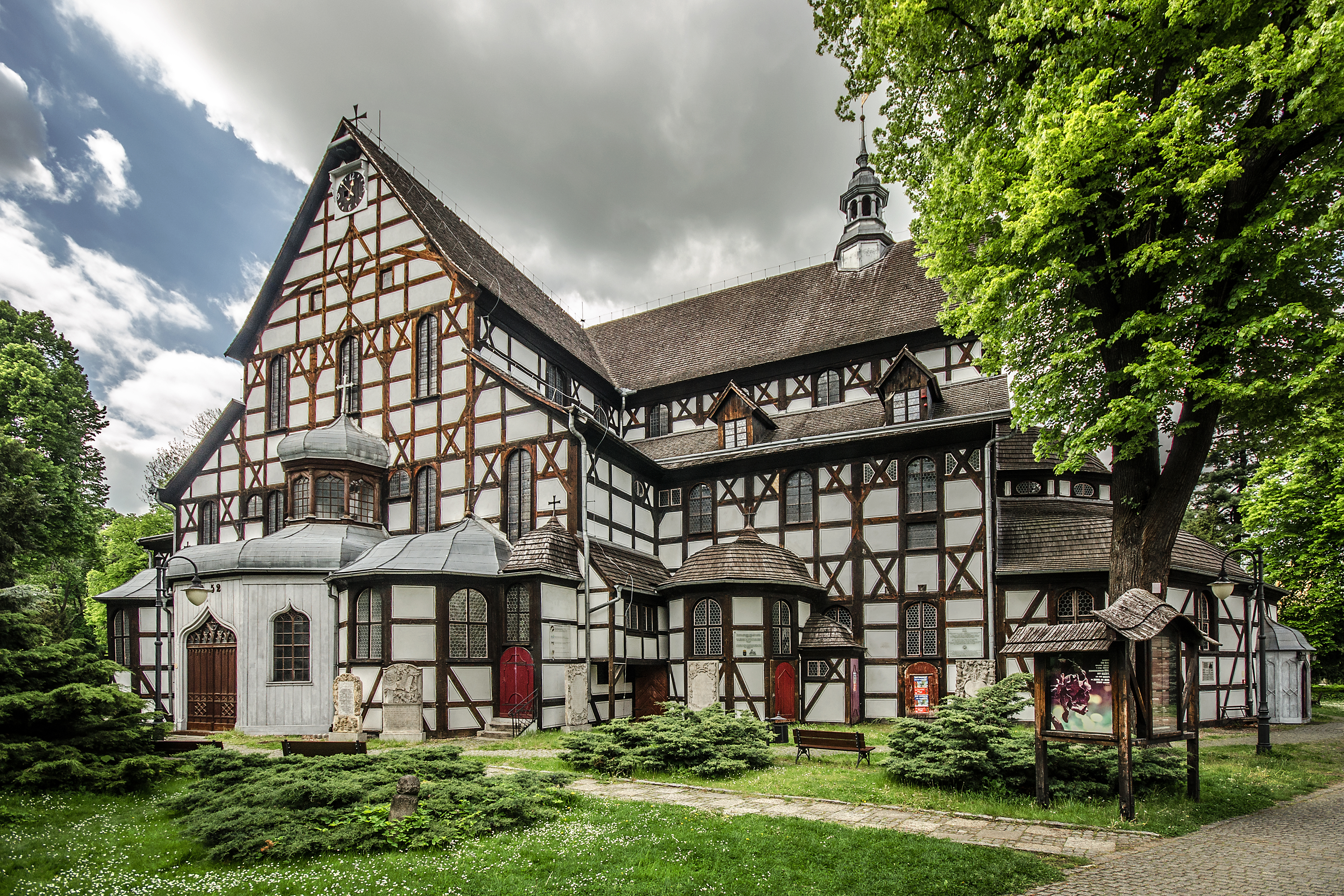
- Old Town, Town Hall and Market Square Cathedral Church of Peace

- Flag Coat of arms

- Location within Poland
- Coordinates: 50°51′N 16°29′E
- Country: Poland
- Voivodeship: Lower Silesian
- County: Świdnica
- Gmina: Świdnica (urban gmina)
- First mentioned: 1070
- City rights: 1267

Government
  - City mayor: Beata Moskal-Słaniewska (L)

Area
  - Total: 21.76 km^{2} (8.40 sq mi)
- Elevation: 250 m (820 ft)

Population (31 December 2021)
  - Total: 55,413 ▼
  - Density: 2,547/km^{2} (6,596/sq mi)
- Time zone: UTC+1 (CET)
  - Summer (DST): UTC+2 (CEST)
- Postal code: 58-100 and 58-105
- Area code: +48 74
- Car plates: DSW
- Website: http://www.um.swidnica.pl

Świdnica (Polish: [ɕfidˈɲit͡sa]; German: Schweidnitz [ˈʃvaɪtnɪts]; Czech: Svídnice [ˈsviːdɲitsɛ]; Silesian: Swidnica) is a city on the Bystrzyca River in south-western Poland in the Lower Silesian Voivodeship. As of 2021, it has a population of 55,413 inhabitants. It is the seat of Świdnica County, and also of the smaller district of Gmina Świdnica, though it forms a separate urban gmina. It is the seventh largest city of the Lower Silesian Voivodeship. Świdnica became part of the Wałbrzych agglomeration on 23 January 2014.

A city with almost a thousand years of history, recorded in 1070, Świdnica was one of the main cities of Silesia and southwestern Poland in the Middle Ages, the second most important center of culture and art in the region (after Wrocław), a famed brewing center, and in 1291–1392 the capital of an eponymous principality ruled by a local line of the Piast dynasty. The city has a preserved Old Town with several Gothic and Baroque churches, including the St. Stanislaus and St. Wenceslaus Cathedral and the Church of Peace, two landmark churches listed as Historic Monuments of Poland with the latter also listed as a UNESCO World Heritage Site.

== History ==
=== Medieval period ===
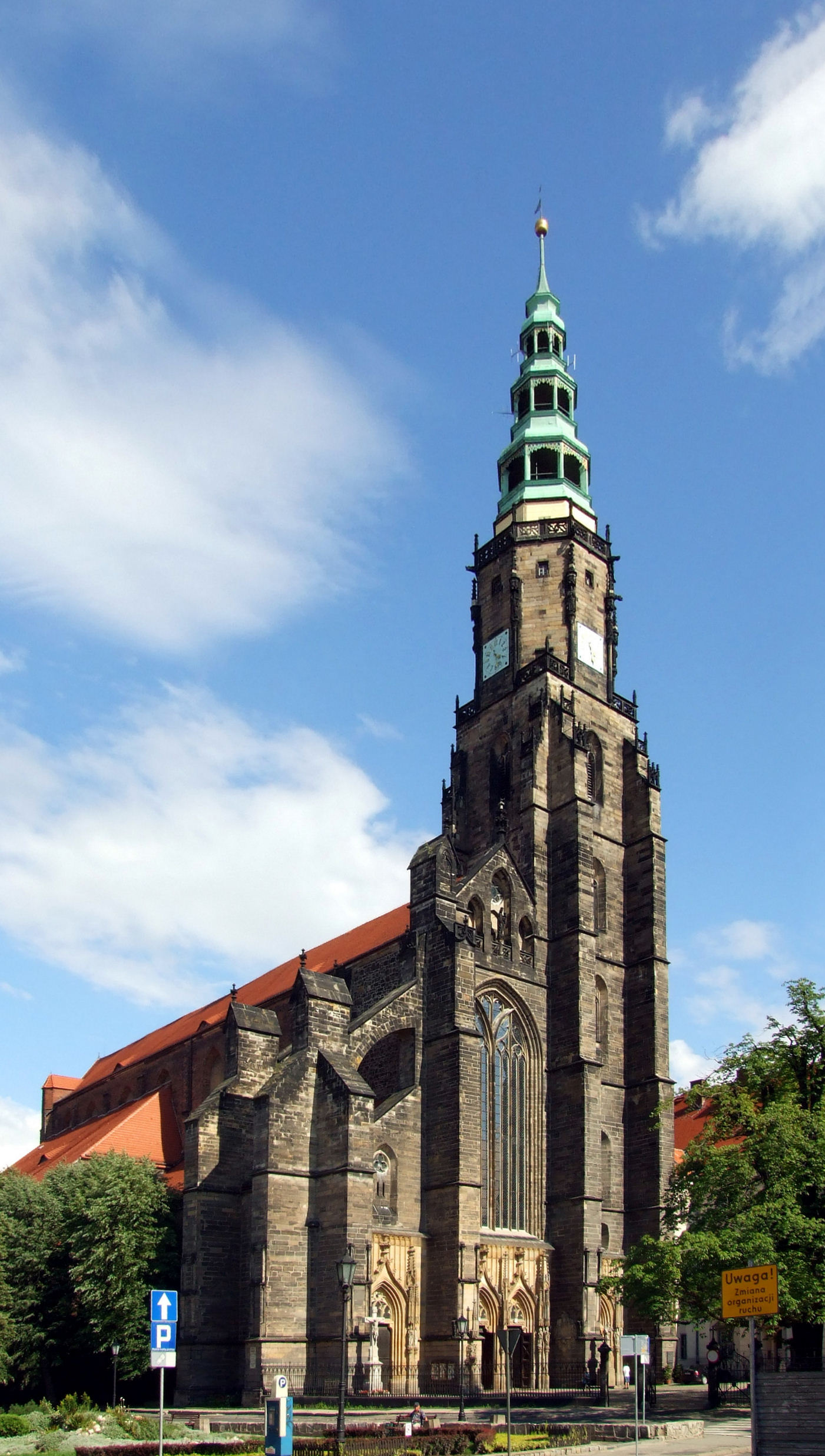
St. Stanislaus and St. Wenceslaus Cathedral, listed as a Historic Monument of Poland

The city's name was first recorded as Svidnica in 1070, when it was part of Piast-ruled Poland. Świdnica became a town in 1250, although no founding document has survived that would confirm this fact. The town belonged at the time to the Duchy of Wrocław, a province of Poland. By 1290, Świdnica had city walls and six gates, crafts and trade were blossoming. At the end of the 13th century, there were guilds of bakers, weavers, potters, shoemakers, furriers and tailors in Świdnica. The city was famous for its beer production. In the late 15th century, almost three hundred houses had the right to brew beer. In various cities of the region (Wrocław, Oleśnica, Brzeg) and Europe (Kraków, Toruń, Prague, Pisa) there were so-called "Świdnica Cellars" – restaurants serving beer from Świdnica. Wrocław's Piwnica Świdnicka exists to this day as the oldest restaurant in Poland and one of the oldest in Europe. There was also a mint in Świdnica. The Franciscans and Dominicans settled in the city in 1287 and 1291, respectively.

In 1291–1392 Świdnica was the capital of the Piast-ruled Duchy of Świdnica and Jawor. The last Polish Piast duke was Bolko II of Świdnica, and after his death in 1368 the duchy was held by his wife until 1392; after her death it was incorporated into the Kingdom of Bohemia by Wenceslaus IV of Bohemia. By the end of the 14th century, Świdnica was already one of the largest cities in Silesia, with about 6,000 inhabitants.

In 1429 the city successfully defended itself against a Hussite attack. In the 15th century, several mills operated in the city. Large cattle and hop markets took place there. In 1493, the town is recorded by Hartmann Schedel in his Nuremberg Chronicle as Schwednitz.

=== Early modern period ===
In 1526 the city came under the rule of the Habsburg monarchy as part of the surrounding Duchy of Schweidnitz (Świdnica). In the 16th century it was one of the regional centers of Anabaptism. The city suffered greatly during the Thirty Years' War (1618–48) as a result of sieges, fires and epidemics. Świdnica was annexed by the Kingdom of Prussia during the First Silesian War (1740–42). The town was turned into a fortress, which it remained until 1866.

Map of Świdnica (1778)

It was captured again by Austria in October 1761, during the Third Silesian War, or Seven Years' War, but Prussians retook it one year later. In 1803 the city was visited by Polish jurist, poet, political and military activist Józef Wybicki, best known as the author of the lyrics of the national anthem of Poland. In 1807 the city was captured by French troops during the Napoleonic Wars. It became part of the Prussian-led German Empire in 1871 during the unification of Germany and stayed within Germany until the end of World War II. According to the Prussian census of 1905, the city of Schweidnitz had a population of 30,540 who were mostly Germans, but also included a Polish minority comprising around 3% of the population. The World War I flying ace Lothar von Richthofen was buried in Schweidnitz, until the city became owned by Poland after World War II in which the graveyard was levelled. During World War I, the Germans operated a POW camp for Allied officers and a forced labour camp for regular POWs in the town.

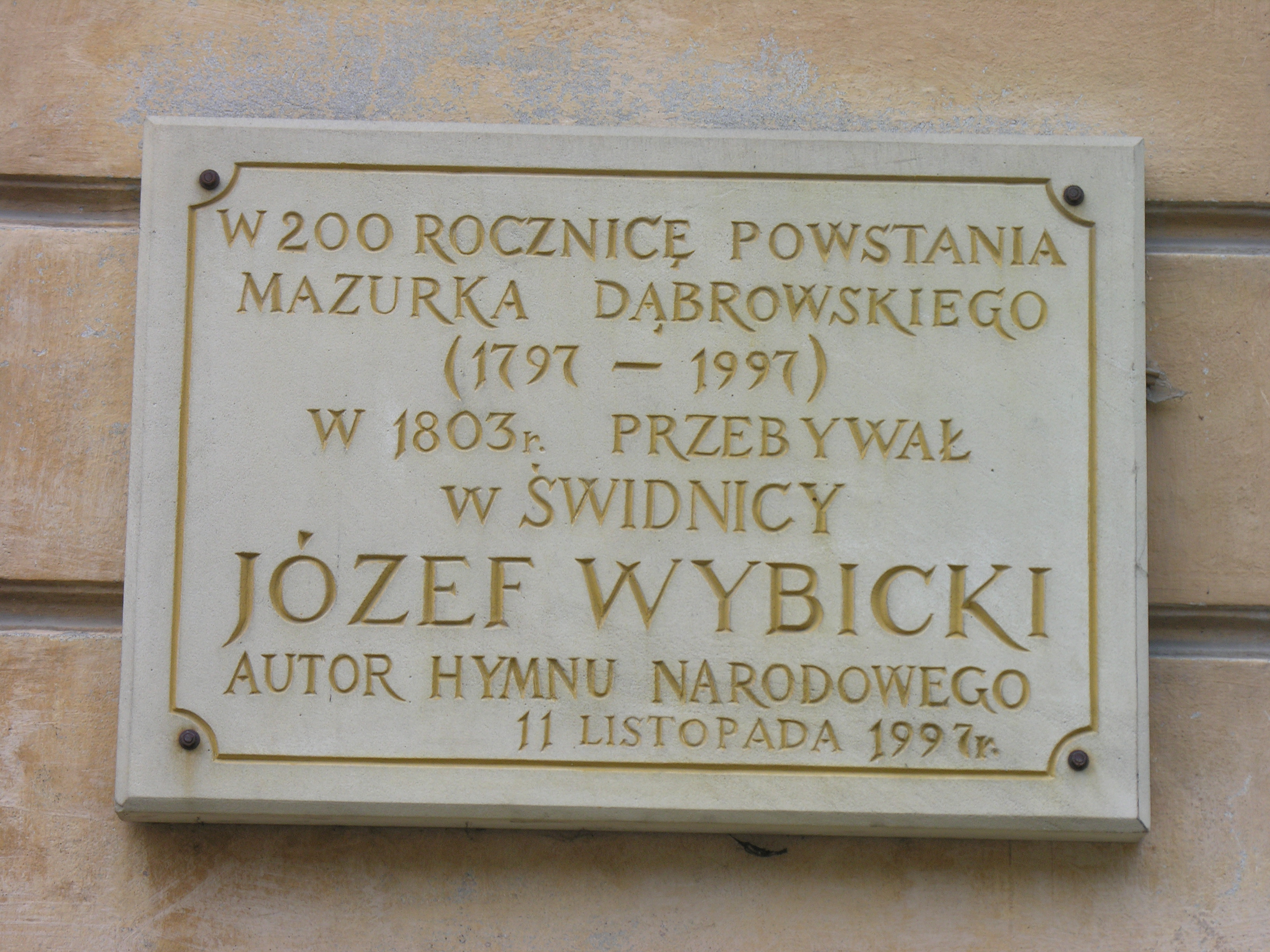
Plaque to Józef Wybicki, commemorating his stay in 1803

=== World War II and recent history ===
A Nazi prison was located in the city under Nazi Germany, and during World War II, the Germans also established a subcamp of the Gross-Rosen concentration camp, three prisoner of war labor divisions of the Stalag VIII-A camp and a forced labour camp. Among the prisoners was Lesław Bartelski, Polish writer and resistance member, who fought in the Warsaw Uprising. In January 1945, a German-perpetrated death march of Allied POWs from the Stalag Luft 7 passed through the city.

After the defeat of Germany in 1945, the town, like most of Silesia, became again part of Poland under border changes agreed at the Potsdam Conference. Those members of the German population who had not already fled or had been killed during the war were subsequently expelled to the remainder of Germany in accordance with the Potsdam Agreement and the city was repopulated with Poles, many of whom had themselves been expelled from Polish areas annexed by the Soviet Union. Also Greeks, refugees of the Greek Civil War, settled in Świdnica in the 1950s. From 1975 to 1998 it was administratively located in the former Wałbrzych Voivodeship.

In 2004, Świdnica became the seat of the Roman Catholic Diocese of Świdnica.

== Jewish History ==
=== Medieval beginnings ===
The first documented presence of Jews in Świdnica dates to the second half of the 13th century. In 1285 Jews in Świdnica received their first recognized privileges from Duke Henry Probus, a sign of official status in the town. By the early 14th century the Jewish community was sufficiently organized to enjoy significant rights: in 1328 the Duke Bolko II the Small reaffirmed earlier privileges (from 1295), including unrestricted trade and moneylending, activities often restricted for Jews elsewhere due to guild regulations.

=== Late Middle Ages through Early-Modern period ===
In the mid-14th century Świdnica was one of the most important centres of Jewish settlement in Silesia. The community maintained a significant rabbinical and scholarly centre: among those active were notable rabbis such as Israel Isserlein and David Falkind. However, in 1453 the community was decimated following accusations of desecration of the Host by the visiting inquisitor John of Capistrano. Seventeen Jews were executed by burning, the rest were expelled, their synagogue was confiscated and converted to a church, and for roughly 300 years there was no Jewish community in Świdnica.

=== Pre-war revival (19th to early 20th century) ===
A new Jewish community was re-established in 1859. The community grew from 137 members to 339 by 1880; a new synagogue was built and consecrated in 1877. By 1925, the community had declined to around 130 members.

=== Post-war period ===
During the Nazi era the Jewish community was destroyed and virtually eliminated. After World War II there was a brief post-war revival: in 1946, around 2,377 Jewish repatriates (from the Soviet Union) arrived in Świdnica; by late 1949 only about 1,245 remained. Jewish communal life in the post-war period included establishment of social and cultural institutions (health societies, cultural clubs, schools), but by the late 1960s – especially following the 1967 Six-Day War – communal activity had largely ceased.

== Points of interest ==
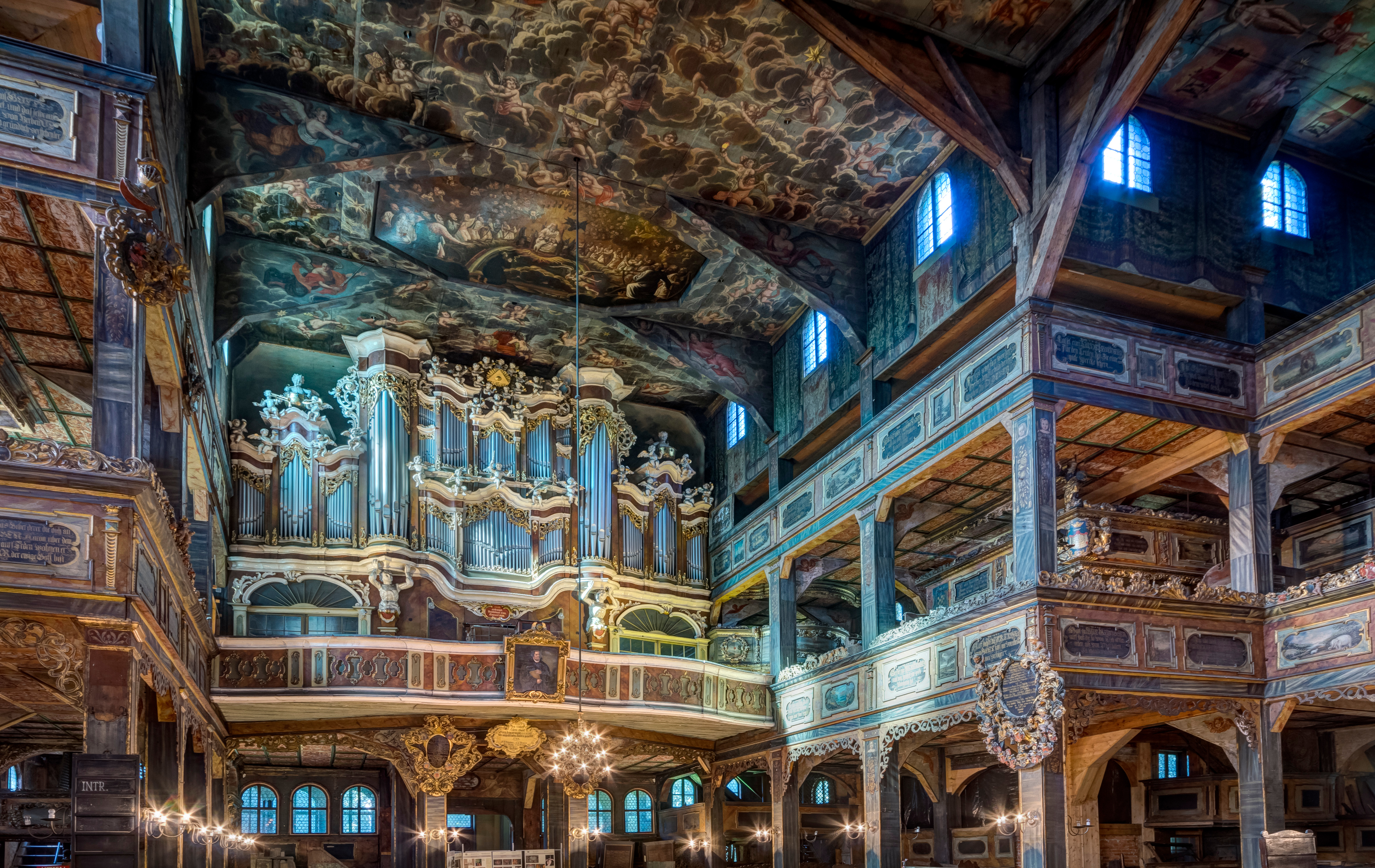
Interior of the Evangelical Church of Peace, a UNESCO World Heritage Site

The Gothic Cathedral of St. Stanislaus and St. Wenceslaus from the 14th century has the highest tower in Silesia, standing 103 meters tall. It is listed as a Historic Monument of Poland.

The Evangelical Church of Peace, a UNESCO World Heritage Site and Historic Monument of Poland, was built in 1656–57.

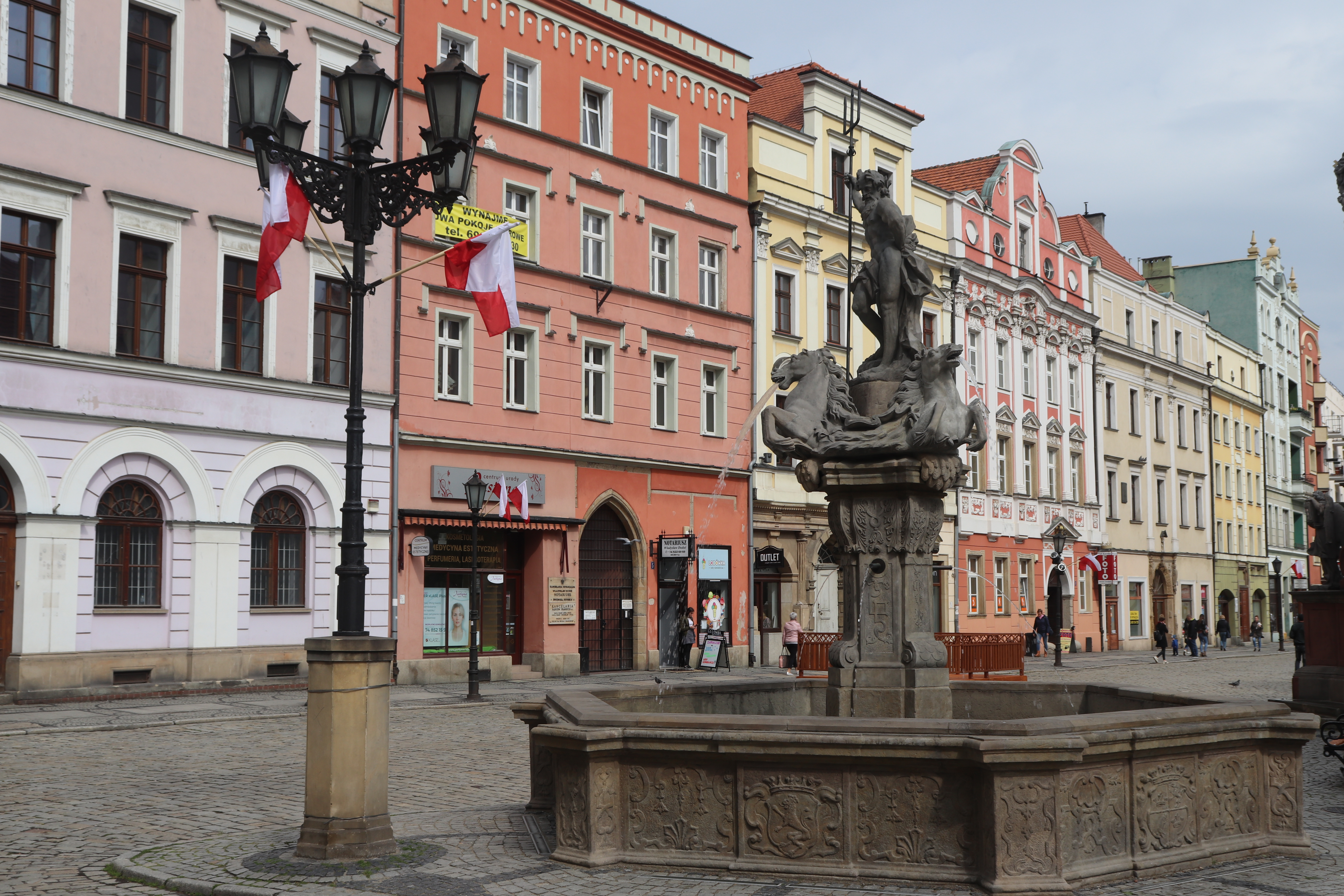
Market Square in the Old Town

The 16th-century town hall has been renovated numerous times and combines Gothic, Renaissance, and Baroque architectural elements. A museum is located in the town hall. The Baroque Church of St. Joseph and the Church of St. Christopher are from the same era. One remaining element of the former defensive works is the Chapel of St. Barbara.

Other notable destinations include the old town and the Stary Rynek square, Gola Dzierżoniowska Castle, Medieval town of Niemcza, Cistercian monastery at Henryków, where the oldest preserved manuscript in Polish was written, and the Wojsławice Arboretum.

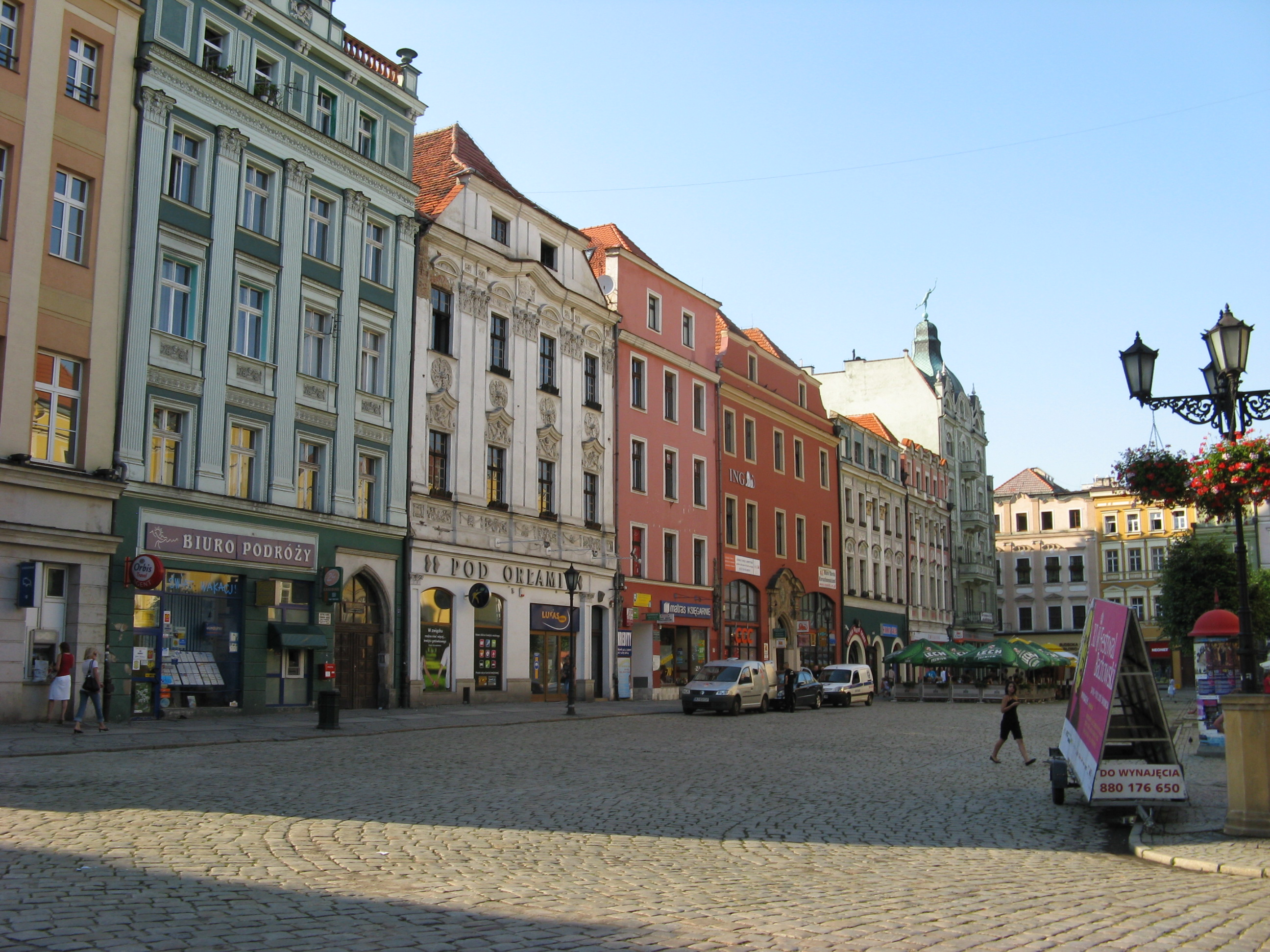
Old Town of Świdnica

== Politics ==
=== Wałbrzych constituency ===
Members of Parliament (Sejm) elected from the Wałbrzych constituency.

Michał Dworczyk	Law and Justice
Marek Dyduch	Democratic Left Alliance
Marcin Gwóźdź	Law and Justice
Izabela Mrzygłocka	Civic Platform
Wojciech Murdzek	Agreement
Tomasz Siemoniak	Civic Platform
Monika Wielichowska	Civic Platform
Ireneusz Zyska	Law and Justice

== Education ==
Świdnica is home to a College of Data Communications Technology (Wyższa Szkoła Technologii Teleinformatycznych).

In 2003, Świdnica hosted a session of the Warsaw-based International Chapter of the Order of Smile, when a Child Friendship Centre was established. Świdnica was officially titled the "Capital of Children's Dreams".

== Sport ==
- Polonia Świdnica – football club that competes in the lower leagues, but also played in the Polish second division in the 1940s and 1950s.

== Notable people ==
- Thomas Stoltzer (c. 1480–1526), composer
- Maria Cunitz (1604–1664), astronomer
- Benjamin Schmolk (1672–1737), composer, poet
- Johann Christoph Glaubitz (c. 1700–1767) architect
- Johann Gottlieb Janitsch (1708–1763), composer
- Karl Theodor Robert Luther (1822–1900), astronomer
- Albert Kretschmer (1825–1891), professor, painter, costumes researcher
- Clara Jaschke (either 1848 or 1858–1912) one of Prussia and Germany's first women railway workers and campaigner for women's rights.
- Emil Krebs (1867–1930), sinologist
- Ferdinand Friedensburg (1886–1972), politician
- Michael Graf von Matuschka (1888–1944), resistance fighter
- Hubert Schmundt (1888–1984), Kriegsmarine Admiral
- Manfred von Richthofen (1892–1918), World War I ace known as "The Red Baron"
- Peter Adolf Thiessen (1899–1990), physical chemist
- Heinz Starke (1911–2001), politician, Bundesfinanzminister 1961–1962
- Georg Gärtner (1920–2013), known as "Hitler's last Soldier in America"
- Gunther Gebel-Williams (1934–2001), animal trainer
- Manfred Kanther (born 1939), politician
- Henning Eichberg (born 1942), cultural sociologist
- Dorota Świeniewicz (born 1972), volleyball player, member of Poland women's national volleyball team
- Bartosz Huzarski (born 1980), cyclist
- Anna Werblińska (born 1984), volleyball player, member of Poland women's national volleyball team
- Janusz Gol (born 1985), Polish professional footballer
- Arkadiusz Piech (born 1985), Polish professional footballer
- Patryk Klimala (born 1998), Polish professional footballer
- Aleksander Balcerowski (born 2000), basketball player

== Gallery ==
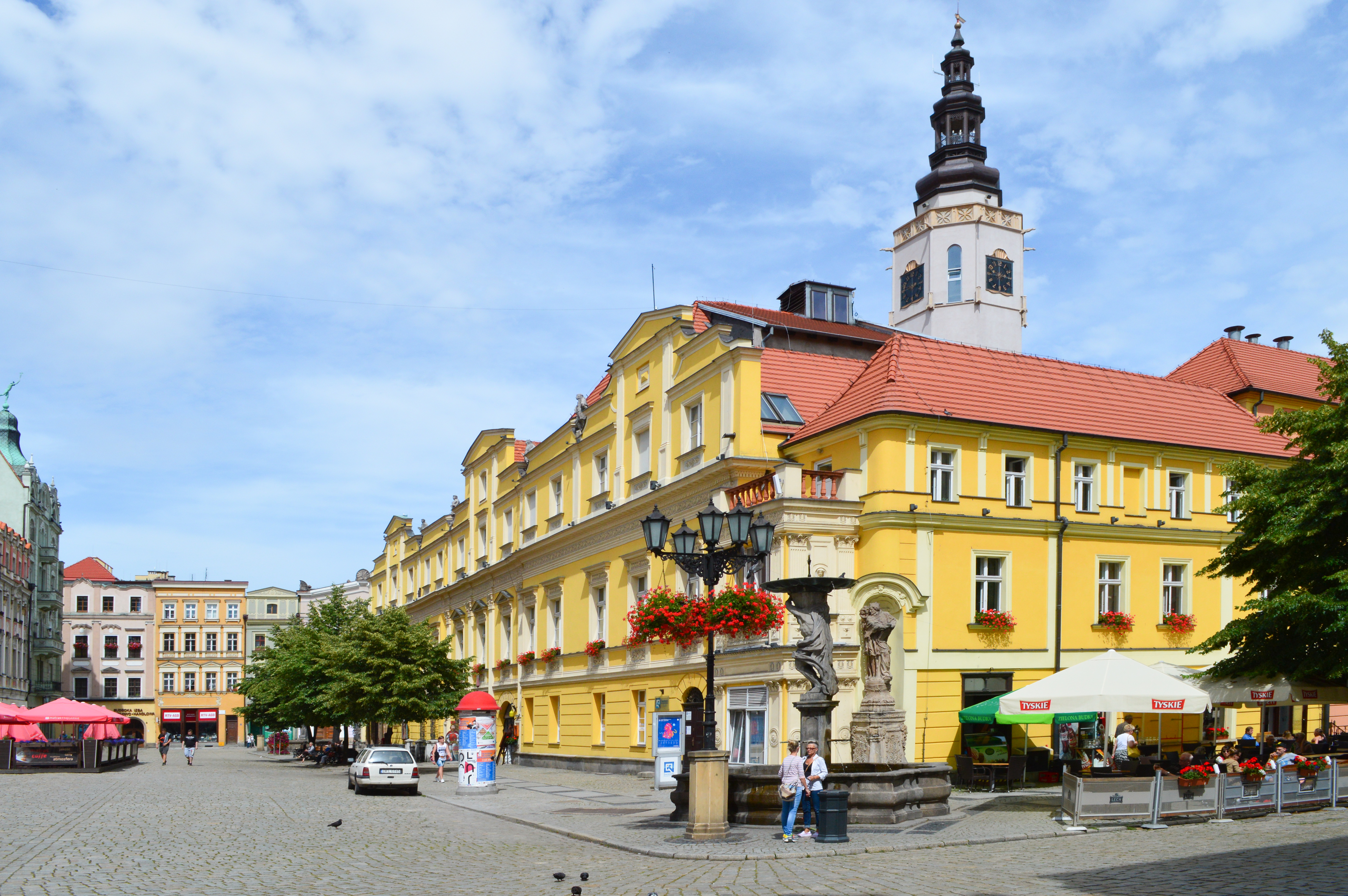
Świdnica Town Hall

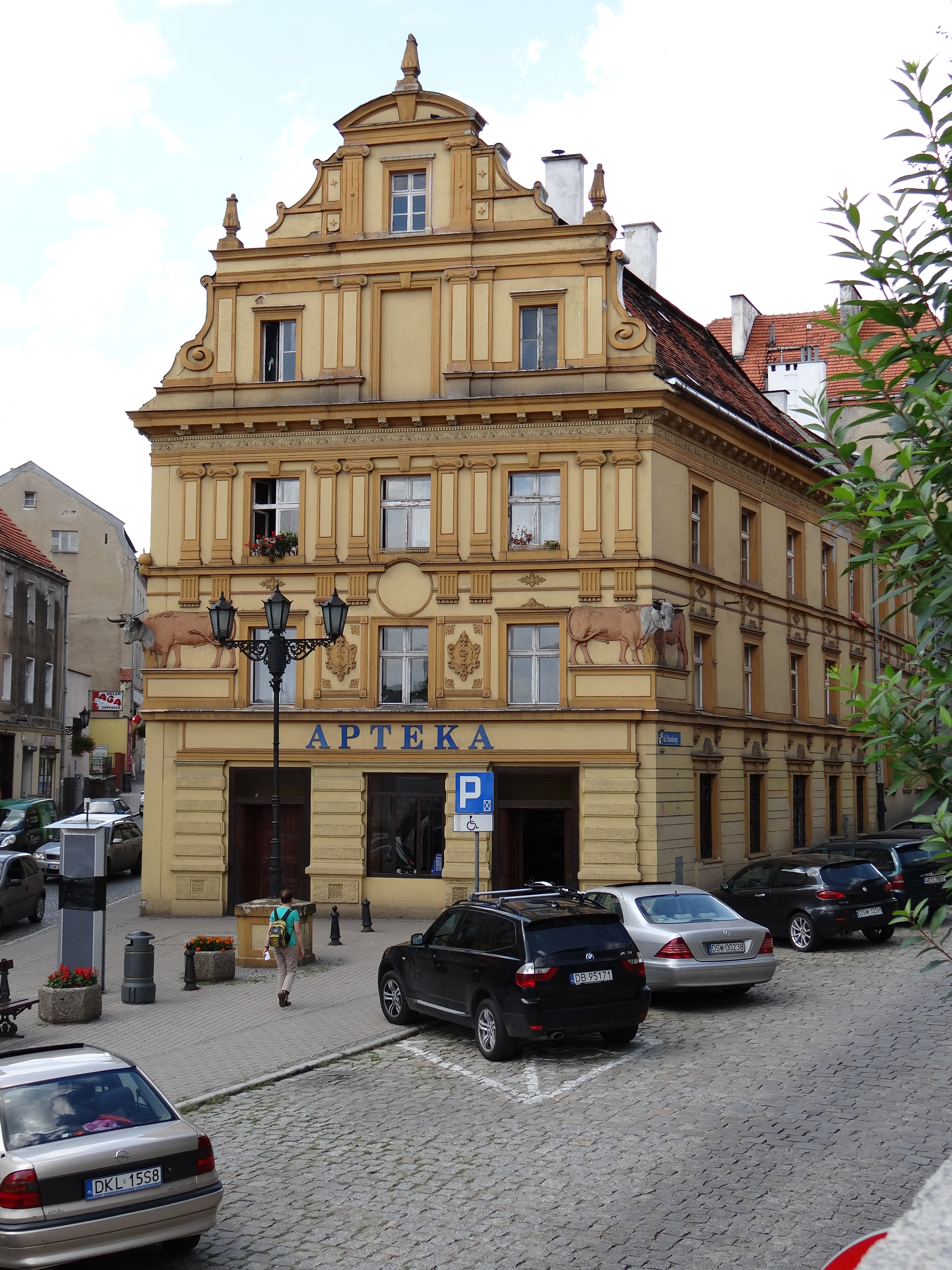
Dom pod bykami (House under the bulls)

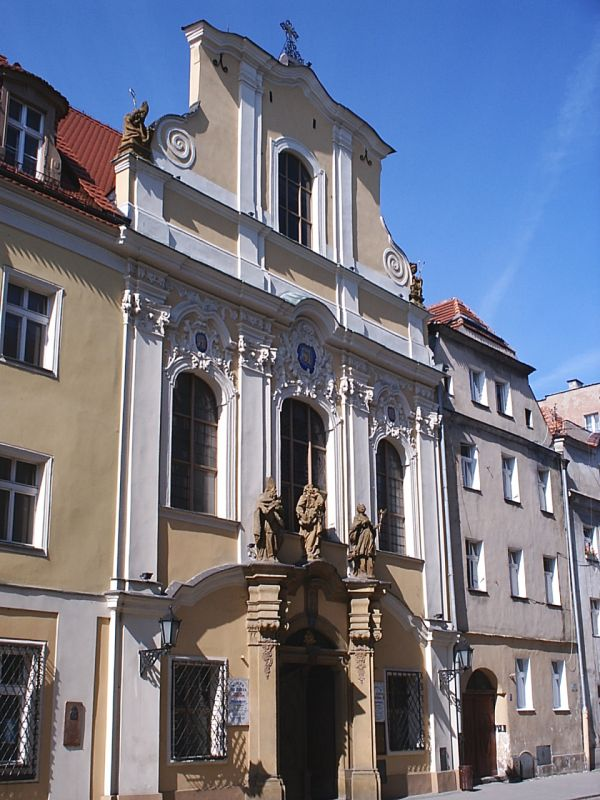
Saint Joseph's Church

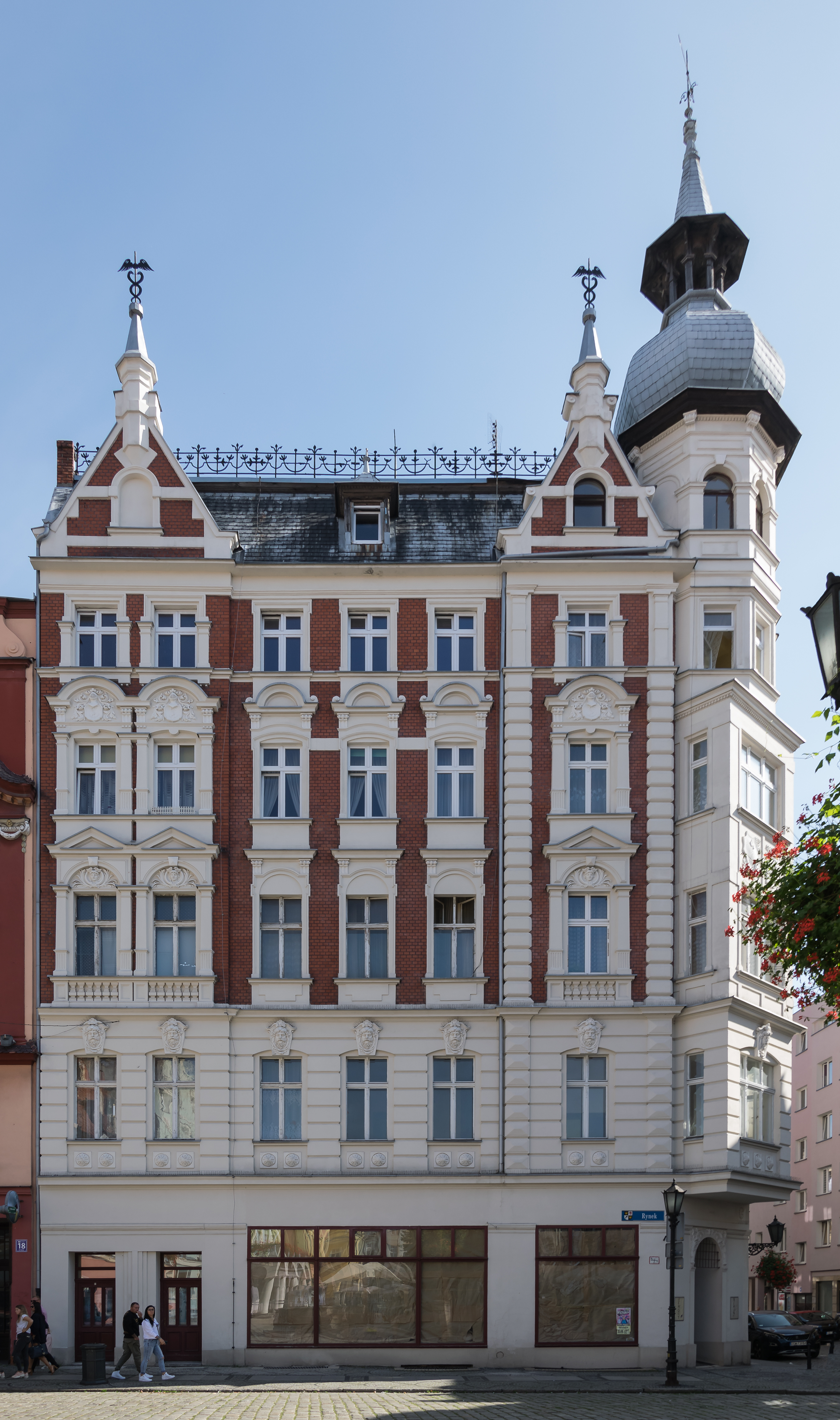
Historic townhouse at the market square

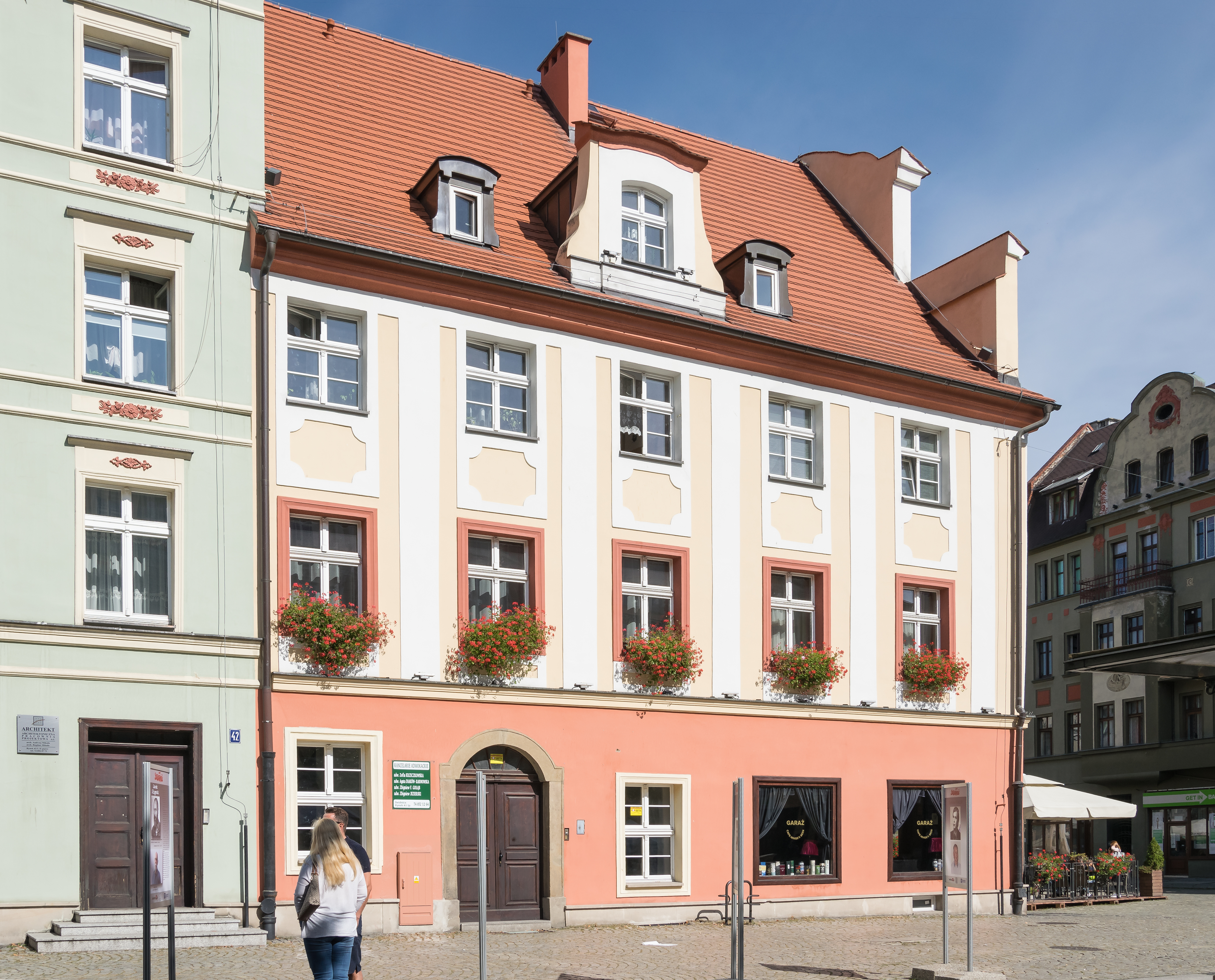
Historic townhouse at the market square

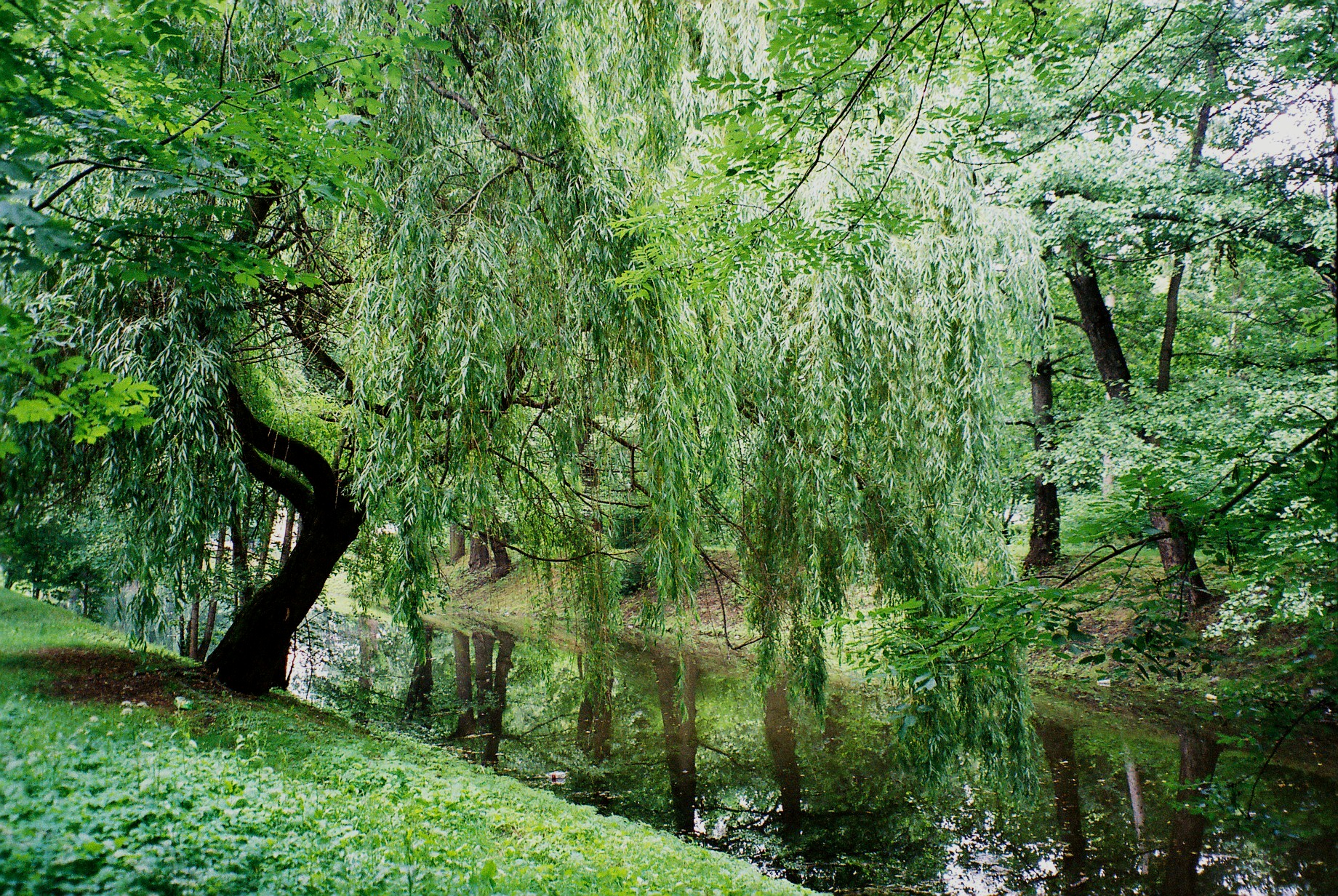
City Park

== Twin towns – sister cities ==
Świdnica is twinned with:

- Biberach an der Riss, Germany
- Ivano-Frankivsk, Ukraine
- Kazincbarcika, Hungary
- Nizhyn, Ukraine
- Police nad Metují, Czech Republic
- Švenčionys, Lithuania
- Trutnov, Czech Republic
- Tendring, United Kingdom
