= Świdnica Cathedral =

St. Stanislaus and St. Wenceslaus Cathedral
- Katedra św. Stanisława i św. Wacława
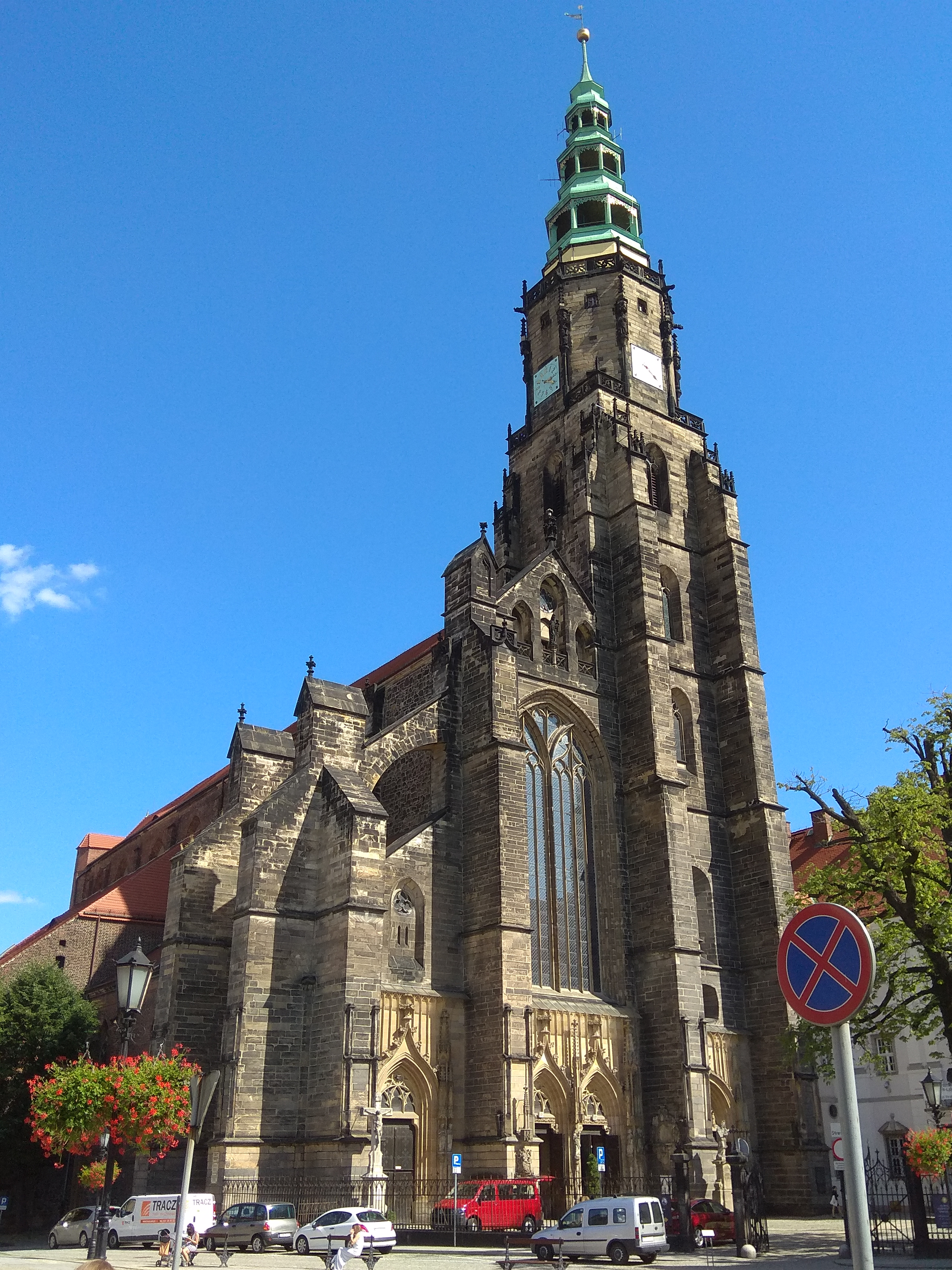
- St. Stanislaus and St. Wenceslaus Cathedral
- 50.8411°N 16.4919°E
- Location: Świdnica
- Country: Poland
- Denomination: Roman Catholic Church
- Website: www.katedra.swidnica.pl

History
- Dedication: St. Stanislaus and Wenceslaus I

Administration
- Diocese: Roman Catholic Diocese of Świdnica

Historic Monument of Poland
- Designated: 15 March 2017
- Reference no.: Dz. U. z 2017 r. poz. 655

The Cathedral of St. Stanislaus and St. Wenceslaus (Polish: Katedra św. Stanisława i św. Wacława) is a historical monument and the main Catholic building in the town of Świdnica, in southwestern Poland.

== History ==
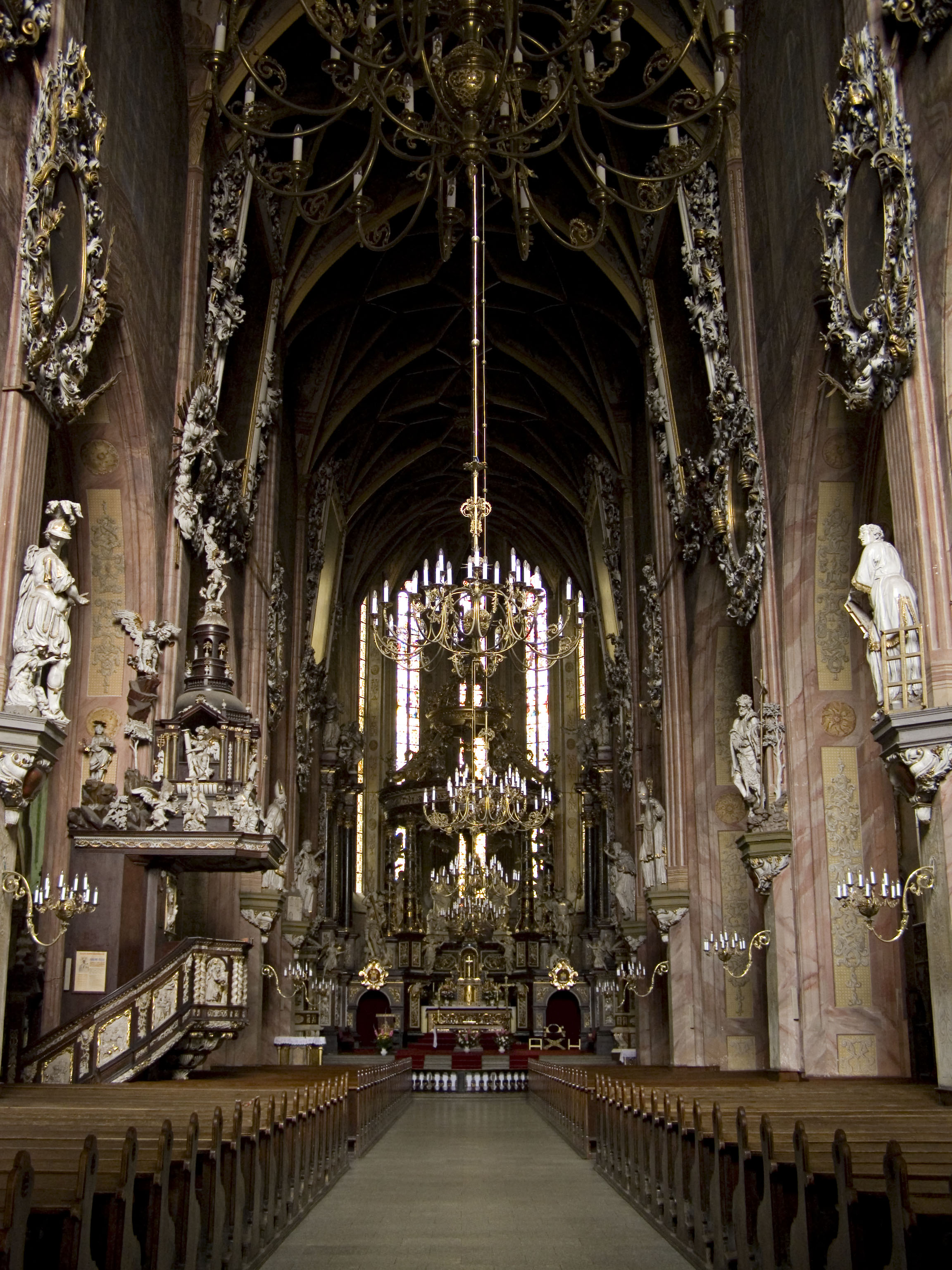
Interior

Construction of the current church began in 1330 at the behest of Duke Bolko II of Świdnica, following a fire that destroyed a wooden building that stood there. The new building, in Gothic style, was designed as a three-aisled basilica with a slender Gothic tower that measures 102 meters, the largest in the region. Between 1400 and 1410 the building was expanded. In the years 1535–1546 the church was renovated after it was greatly damaged in the fire of 1532.

From 1561 to 1629 the church was owned by Protestants. From 1662 it belonged to the Jesuits who in the years 1671–1688 have added to it baroque furniture and decorations that still characterize its interior. With the gradual expulsion of the Jesuits of Prussian Silesia, the church was secularized in 1772 and the Prussian authorities converted it into a barn.

The church was renovated between 1893 and 1895 but lost many of its original architectural features. On 25 March 2004, with the bull Multos fructus, of Pope John Paul II, established the Catholic Diocese of Świdnica, and the building became the cathedral.

== See also ==
- Roman Catholicism in Poland
- St. Stanislaus
