= Holy Trinity Church of Peace in Świdnica =

Church in Świdnica, Poland

Coordinates: 50°50′46″N 16°29′29″E

Church of Peace
- Holy Trinity Church of Peace
- Kościół Pokoju im. Trójcy Świętej
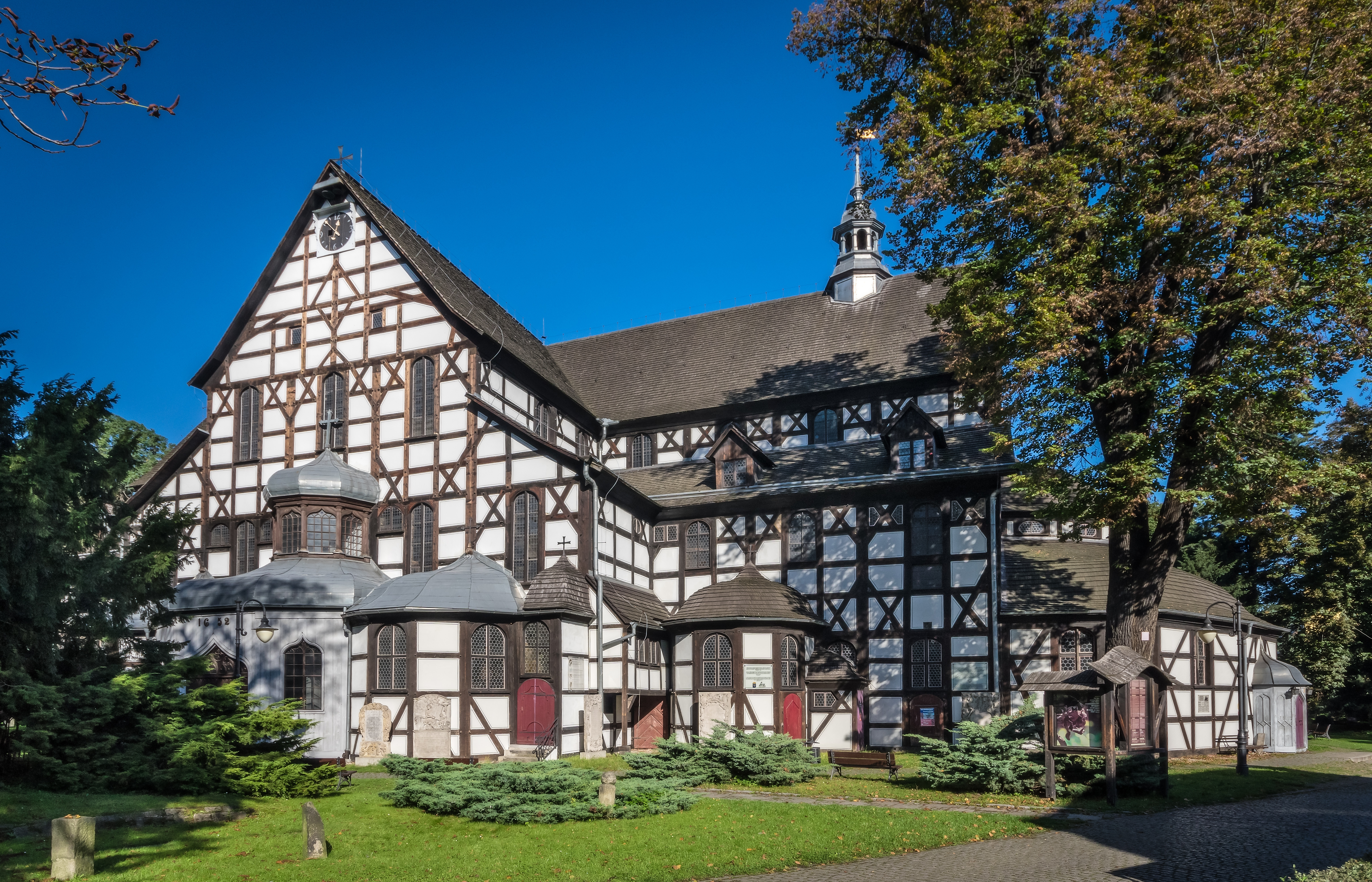

- Location: Świdnica
- Country: Poland
- Language: Polish
- Denomination: Lutheran

History
- Status: Parish church

Architecture
- Functional status: Active
- Style: Baroque

Administration
- Archdiocese: Wrocław

Historic Monument of Poland
- Designated: 2017-03-15
- Reference no.: Dz. U. z 2017 r. poz. 672

UNESCO World Heritage Site
- Part of: Churches of Peace in Jawor and Świdnica
- Criteria: Cultural: (iii), (iv), (vi)
- Reference: 1054-002
- Inscription: 2001 (25th Session)

The Holy Trinity Church of Peace in Świdnica is the largest wooden Baroque temple in Europe and a historic religious building built under the agreements of the Treaty of Westphalia signed in 1648, which ended the Thirty Years' War. It belongs to the Świdnica parish of the Evangelical-Augsburg Church in Poland. The building has been on the UNESCO World Heritage List since 2001.

== History ==
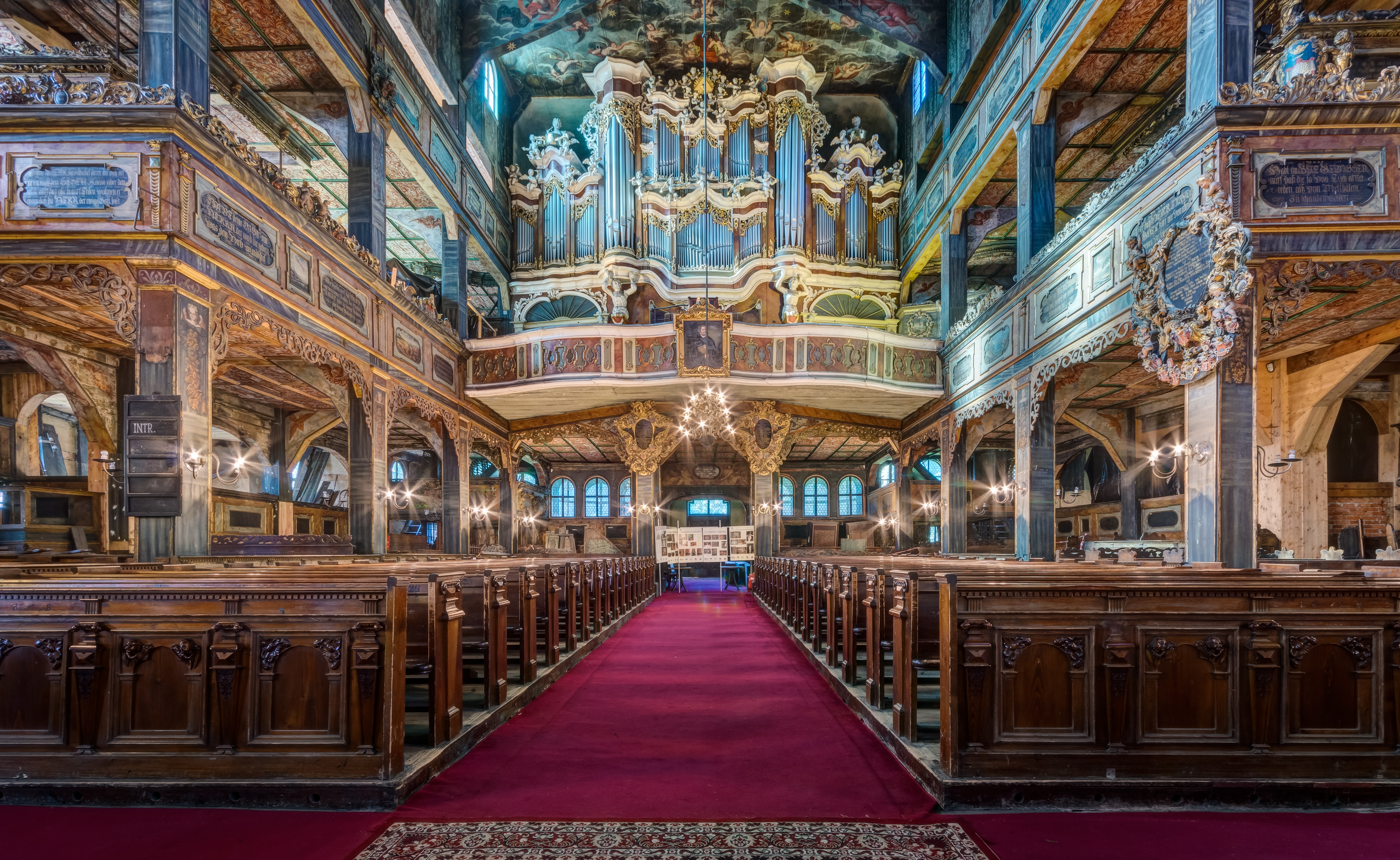
Interior of the Church of Peace, the organs

Świdnica's Church of Peace was one of the three Churches of Peace (after Głogów and Jawor) that the Catholic Emperor Ferdinand III, under pressure from Protestant Sweden, allowed to be built in the Habsburg hereditary principalities in Silesia. All churches built by Catholics and taken over by Protestants were returned to the Catholic Church. After the war broke out, the Evangelicals were deprived of the right to profess their own faith and hold their own churches. However, in the principalities ruled by the Silesian Piasts - mostly Evangelicals - all churches were allowed to remain Protestant.

The construction of the Churches of Peace was intentionally subject to additional conditions that were to make their construction more difficult or, in the event of their completion, cause the temple to be used for a short period of time. The foundation stone of the church in Świdnica was laid on 23 August 1656. The author of the project was a Wrocław master builder Albrecht von Saebisch. The church was built by Andreas Kaemper, a carpenter from Świdnica. To raise funds for the construction a native of Świdnica Christian Czepko set off on a journey around European Protestant courts. Silesian Evangelicals of all social classes, from peasants to townsmen and noblemen, were involved in the construction.

After 10 months of construction the first service in the new Świdnica church was held on 24 June 1657.

In 1708, during the Great Northern War, when the religious situation of Evangelicals improved, again under pressure from the Swedish king, a bell tower and an Evangelical school were built next to the church. Both buildings survived to this day.

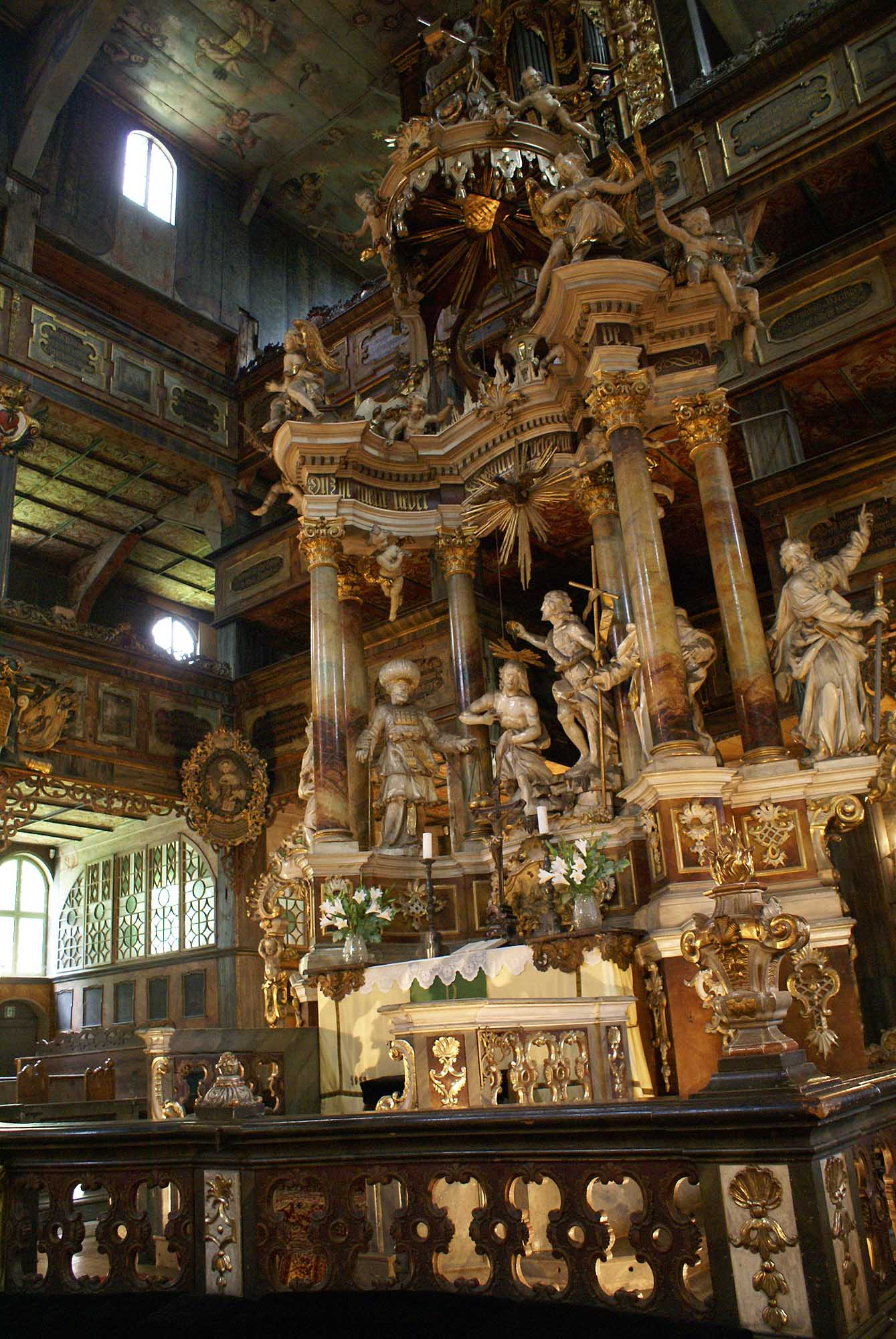
Main altar

Although the church was founded as a result of religious conflicts, it is a symbol of reconciliation. In 1989, Polish Prime Minister Tadeusz Mazowiecki and German Chancellor Helmut Kohl prayed together for peace in the church. In 2011, the church hosted the Swedish royal couple Carl XVI Gustav and Queen Silvia. In 2014, German Chancellor Angela Merkel and Polish Prime Minister Ewa Kopacz participated in an ecumenical prayer for peace. In September 2016, the "Appeal for Peace" was signed in the Świdnica church by representatives of Christian faiths, Judaism, Islam and Buddhism (represented by the Dalai Lama XIV).

== Architecture ==
The Church of Peace in Świdnica was built in the wattle and daub system as a centrally located building based on a wooden frame filled with a mass of clay and straw. It was built on a Greek cross plan. The central building was complemented by the Baptismal Hall and the sacristy in the east, the Hall of the Dead in the west, the Wedding Hall in the south, and the Field Hall in the north. It is 44 m long and 30.5 m wide. The first floor and four floors of galleries can accommodate 7,500 people (including 3,000 seats). The church was built with the intention to accommodate as many people as possible, which was important especially in the times when freedom of religion was restricted for Protestants, as it was one of the two Protestant churches in the Świdnica-Jawor Principality. Therefore, the temple has a vast internal space (1090 m^{2}) and volume.

== Interior ==
The altar and the pulpit are among the most valuable pieces of equipment in the church.

=== Pulpit ===
The Baroque pulpit, work of Gotfried August Hoffmann, dates back to 1729. The staircase is decorated with biblical scenes: "Pentecost", "Golgotha" and "Paradise". The balustrade has carved allegories of Faith, Hope and Love. Above the door to the pulpit is a sculpture of Jesus the Good Shepherd.

=== Main altar ===
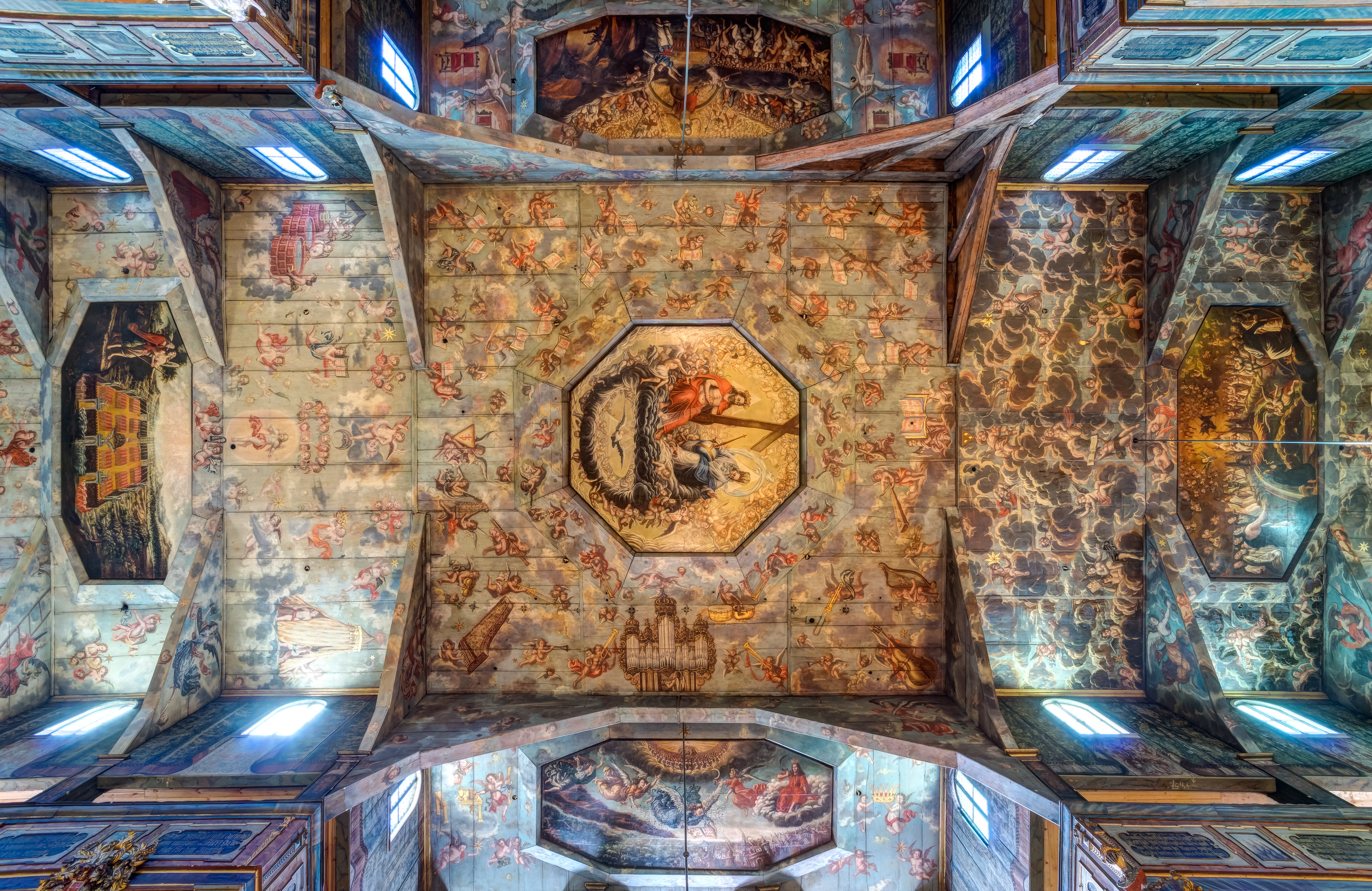
Ceiling

The main altar, also a work of Hoffmann, was commissioned for the church's centennial in 1752 and completed the following year. Above the altar mensa is a small relief depicting the Last Supper. The center features the "Baptism of Christ" and the figures of Moses, High Priest Aaron and the apostles Peter and Paul. Above, a frieze with the inscription rests on six Corinthian columns: "Dies ist mein geliebter Sohn, an dem ich Wohlgefallen habe" ("This is my beloved son, in whom I am well pleased" - Matthew 3:17). In the center, at the height of the frieze, is an allegory of the Holy Spirit in the form of a dove. Above, under the canopy, a golden triangle, surrounded by rays, with the tetragram of God's name written in Hebrew script - an allegory of God the Father. At the top of the altar, a lamb with a flag stands on a book with seven seals.

=== Organs ===
An antique organ with 62 pipes and a baroque prospectus from the years 1666–1669, built by Gottfried Klose of Brzeg and rebuilt several times, has also survived. Smaller organs, founded in 1695 by Sigismund Ebersbach, are located on the highest gallery above the altar.

The present organ, dates from 1909 and was made by a Świdnica company - Schlag & Söhne, which introduced electric power.

=== Hochberg Loge ===
The most privileged families had their own loges in the church. In front of the pulpit, above the main entrance to the church, there is a beautiful, richly decorated loge of the Hochberg family, benefactors of the church, built in 1698. The loge was built as a token of gratitude to the family of Count Johann Heinrich von Hochberg, who founded the oak trees for the construction of the church.

=== Galleries ===
The entire length of the galleries is covered with 78 blocks of biblical verses and 47 allegorical scenes. Paintings on the boards illustrate the meaning of the biblical quotations. The balustrades of the galleries are richly decorated with sculptures and paintings.

=== Paintings ===
The ceilings of the church are decorated with paintings from 1694 to 1696 by two painters from Świdnica - Chrystian Sussenbach and Chrystian Kolitschka. They illustrate scenes from the Revelation of St. John:

- "The Heavenly Jerusalem”,
- God the Father, with an eagle circling over his head, surrounded by seven flames, a closed book with seven seals in his lap, with a lamb resting on it; 24 old men kneel around him; John can be seen praying below,
- "The fall of the sinful city of Babylon."
- "The Last Judgment."

The Holy Trinity is painted at the intersection of the naves.

The ceilings around the paintings and the ceilings of the galleries and pillars are painted with floral patterns.

== Gallery ==
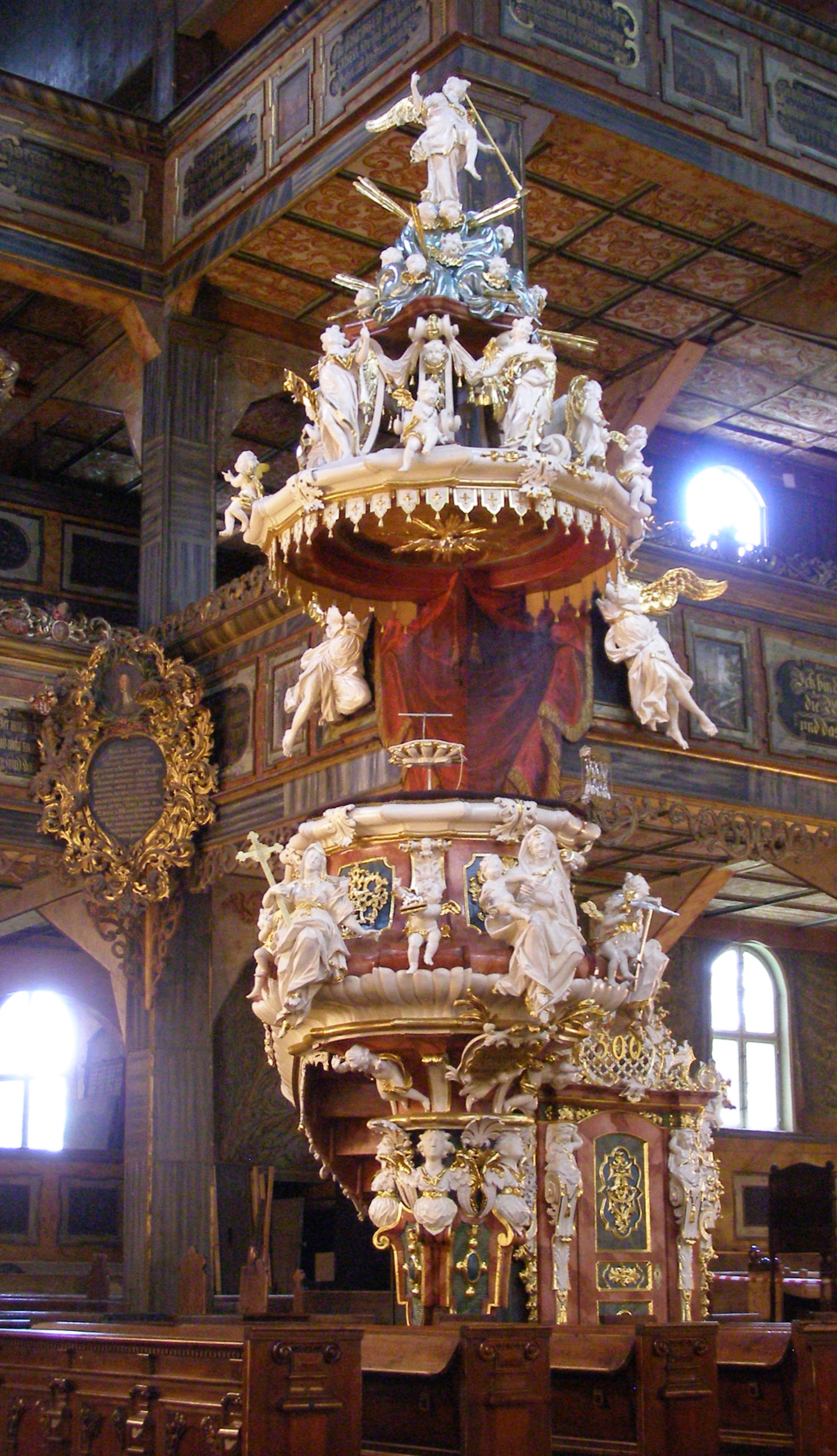
Pulpit

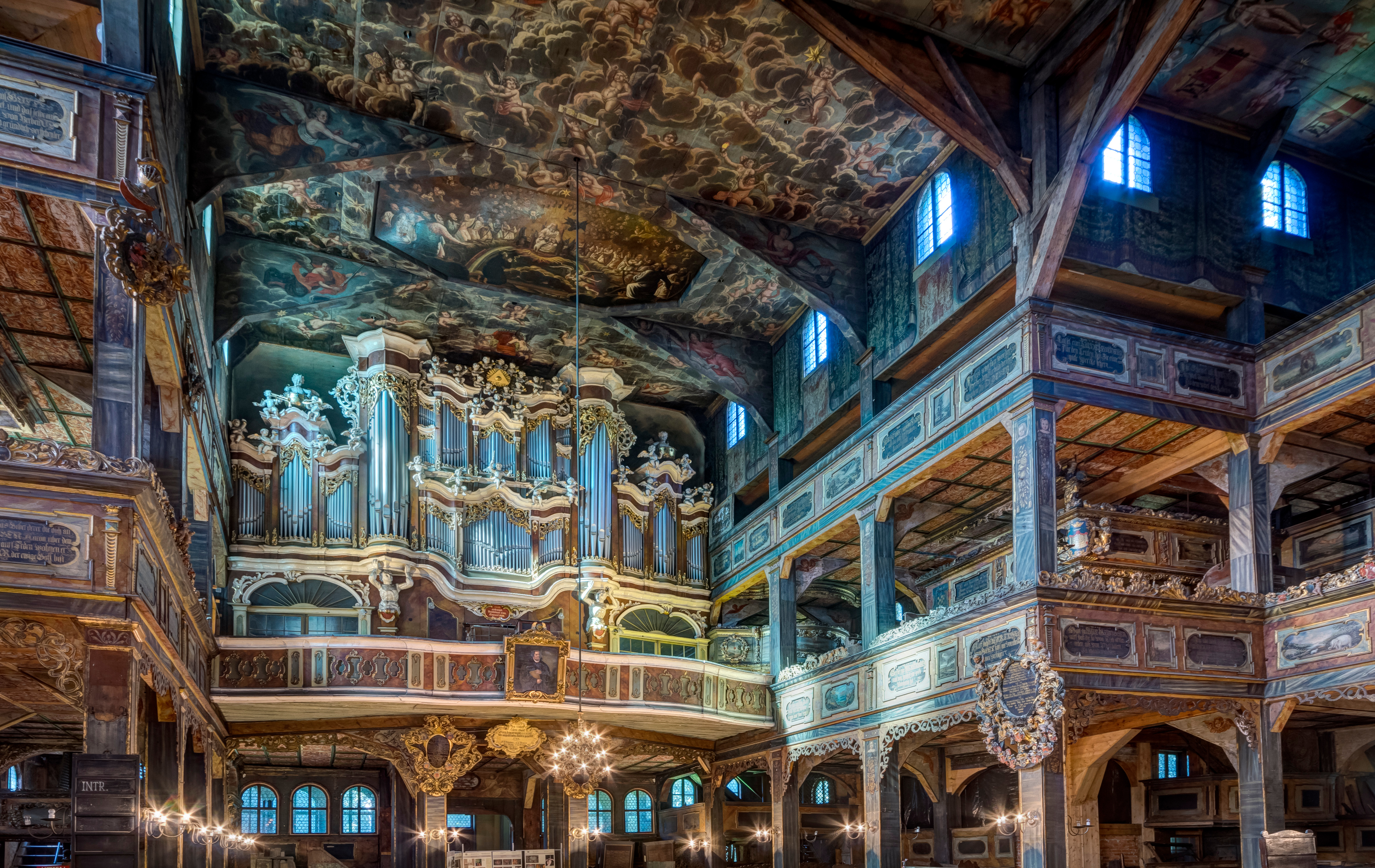
Organs

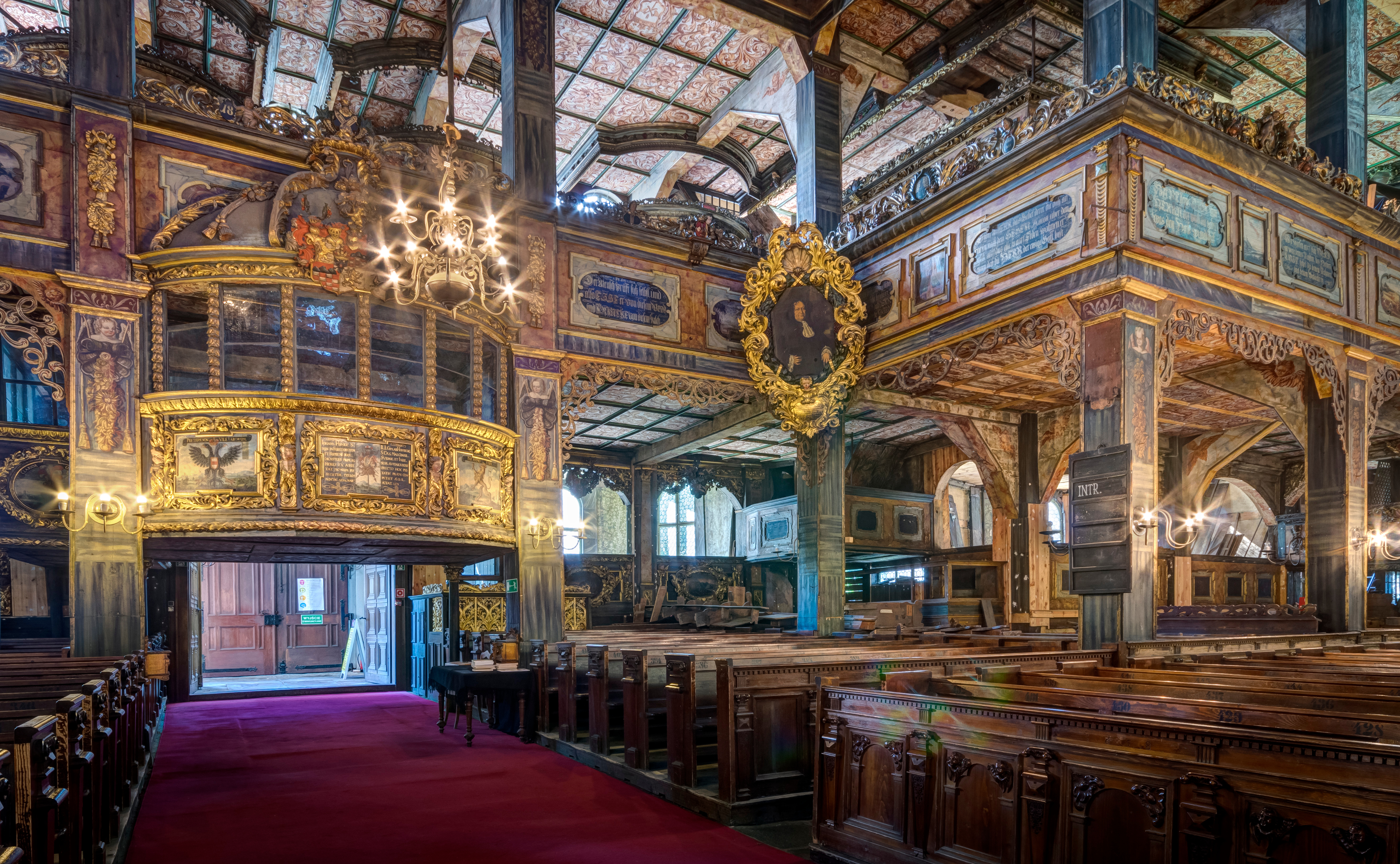
Hochberg loge

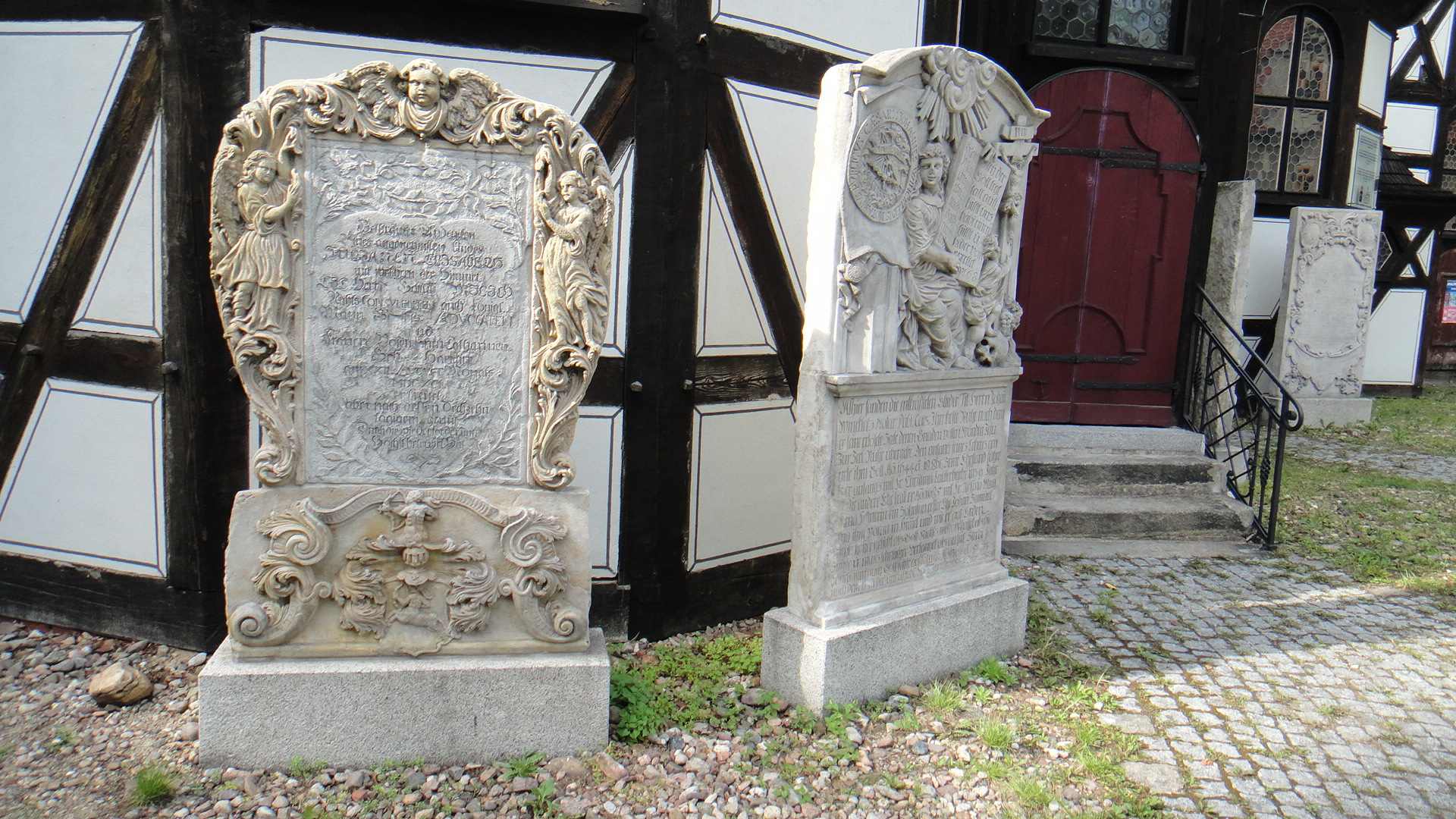
Gravestones

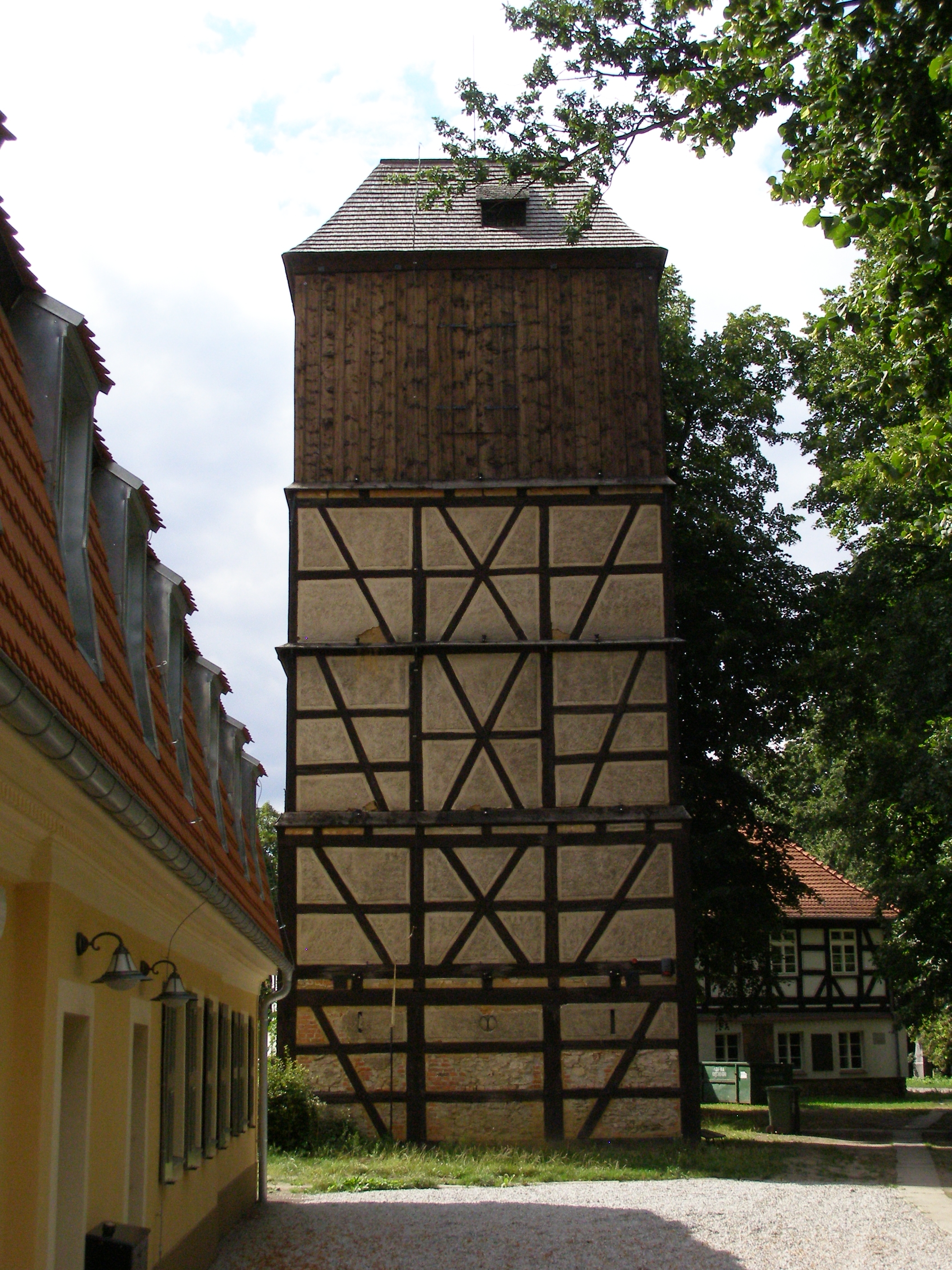
Bell tower

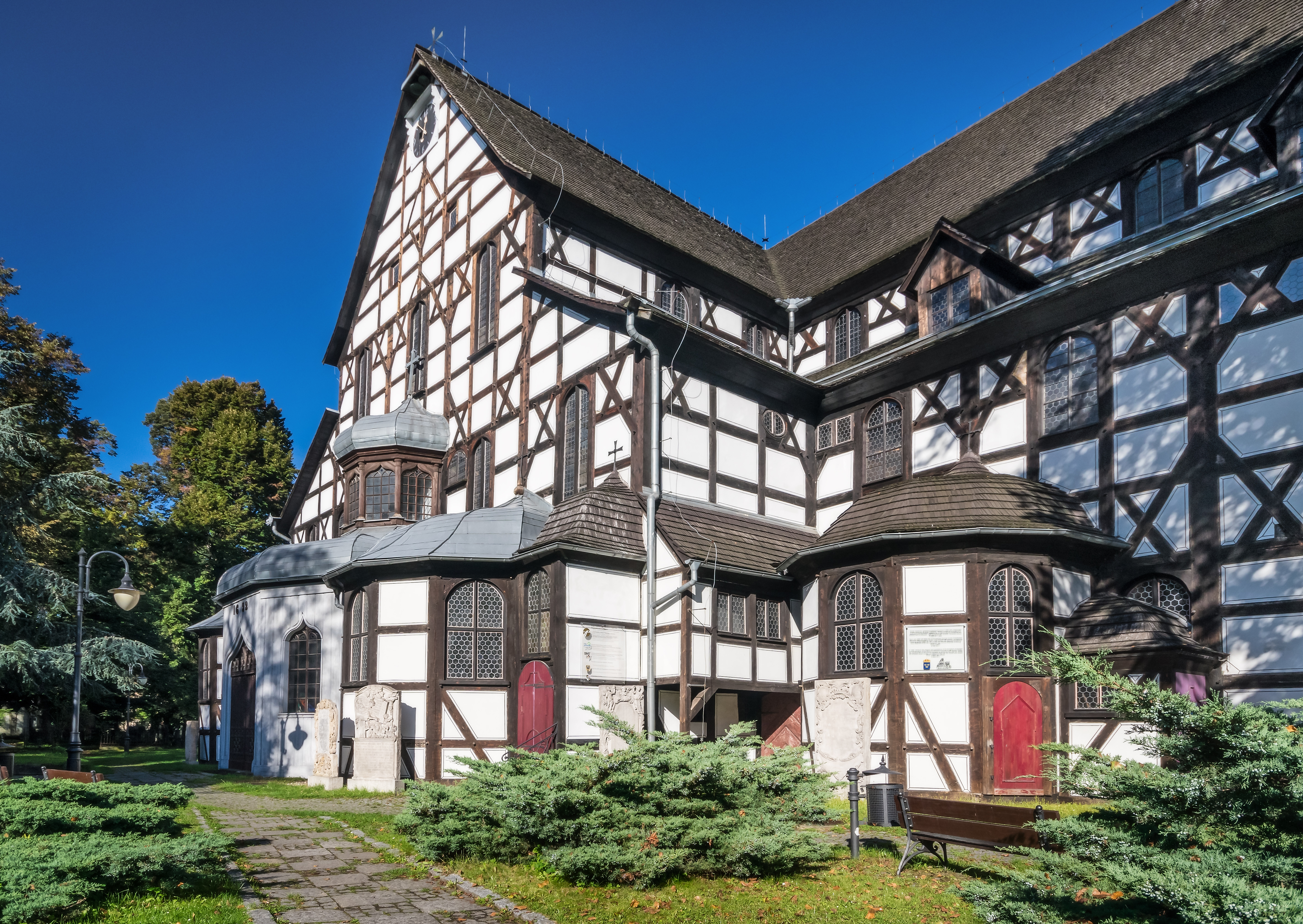
Rear part of the temple

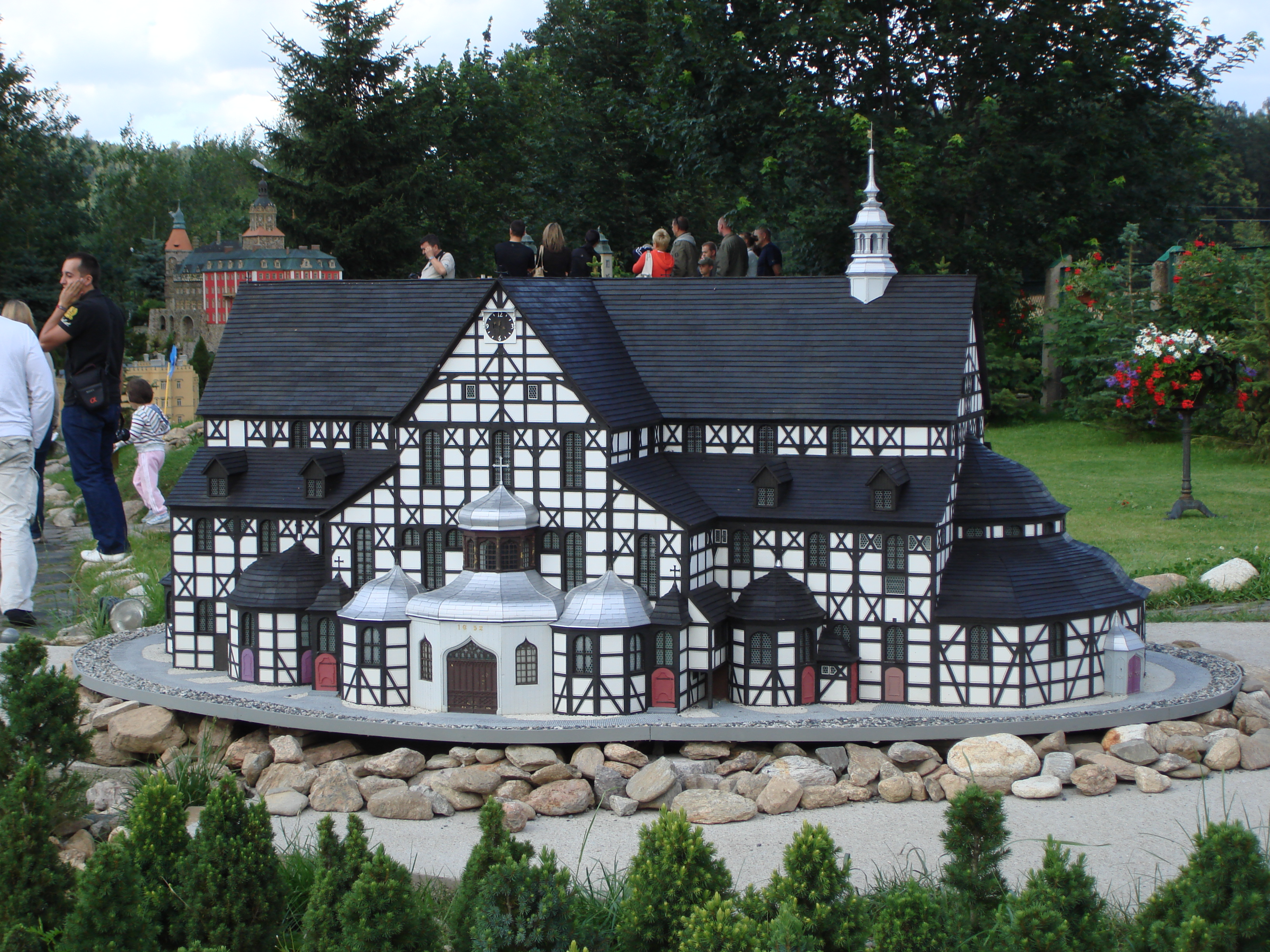
Miniature of the Świdnica Church of Peace in the park of miniatures in Kowary

== See also ==
- Churches of Peace

== Bibliography ==
- Janusz Czerwiński, Wrocław i okolice, wyd. Wydawnictwo Sport i Turystyka, Warszawa, 1989, ISBN 83-217-2279-2.
