= Churches of Peace =

Churches of Peace in Jawor and Świdnica
UNESCO World Heritage Site
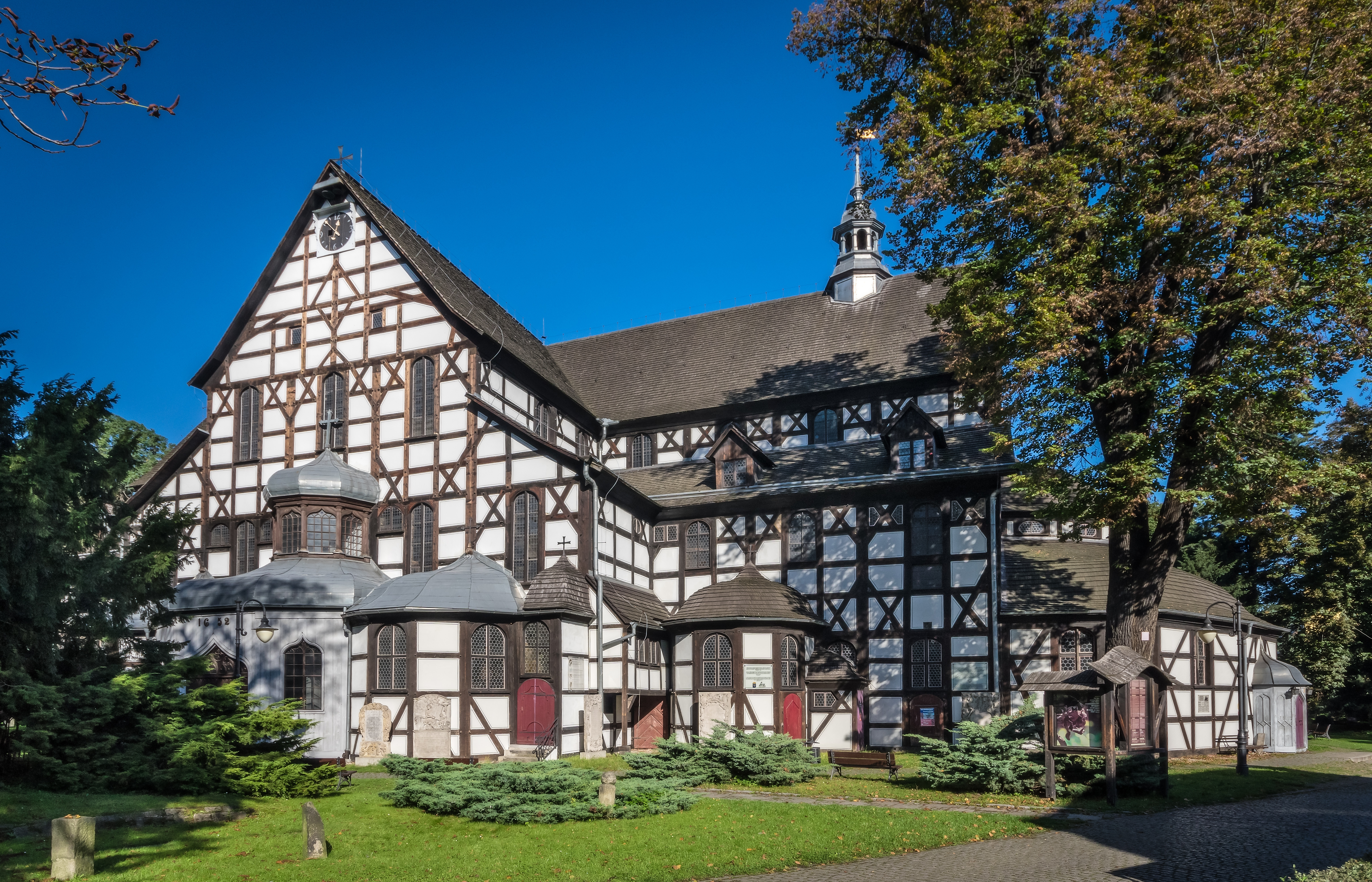
- Church of Peace in Świdnica
- Interactive map of Churches of Peace in Jawor and Świdnica
- Location: Lower Silesian Voivodeship, Poland
- Criteria: Cultural: iii, iv, vi
- Reference: 1054
- Inscription: 2001 (25th Session)

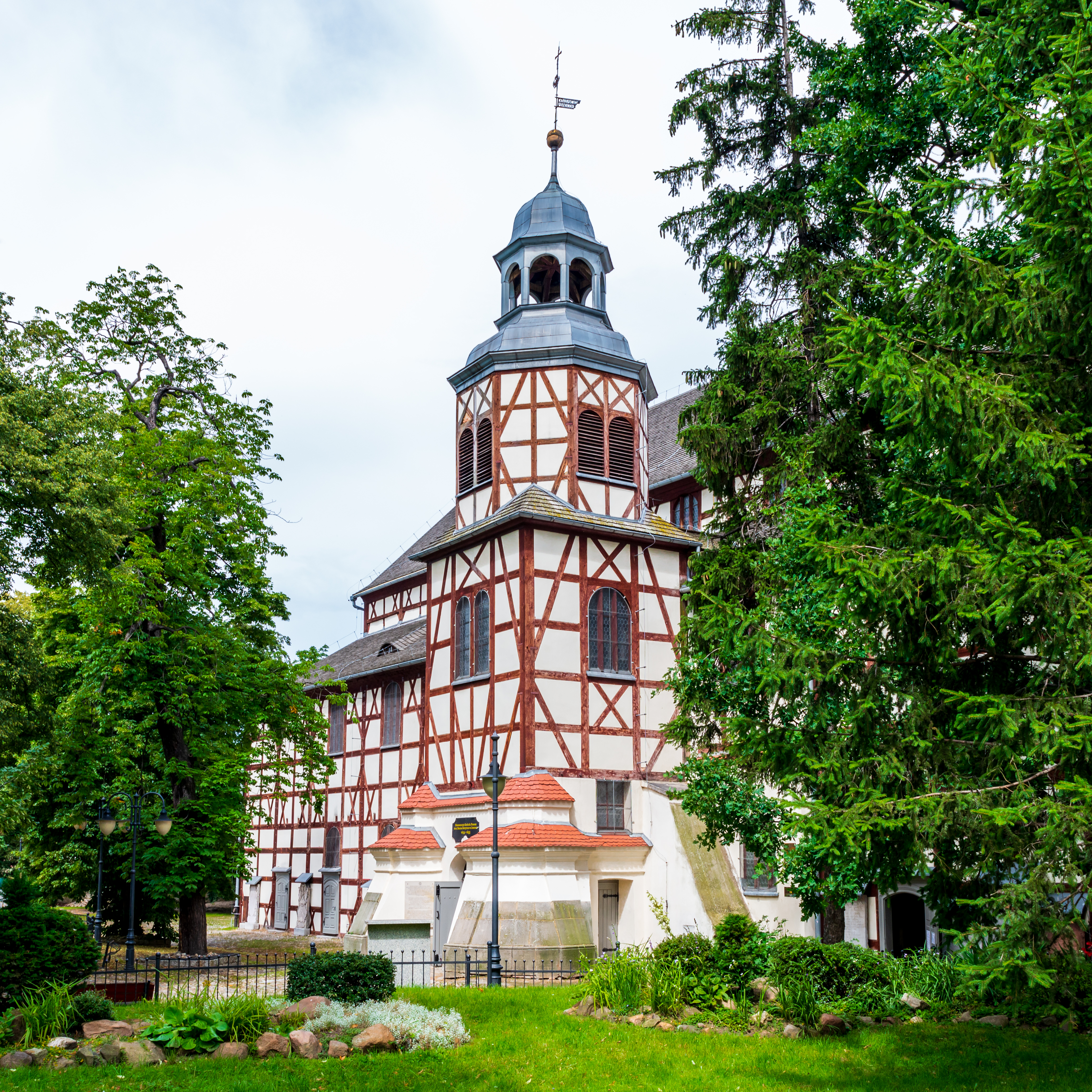
The belfry of the Peace Church in Jawor framed between trees in Park Pokoju.

The Churches of Peace (Polish: Kościoły Pokoju, German: Friedenskirchen) in Jawor and Świdnica in Lower Silesia. Poland, are 17th-century churches, named after the Peace of Westphalia of 1648.

The treaty granted the Lutherans of Silesia to build three churches from wood, loam and straw outside the city walls, without steeples and church bells. The construction time was limited to one year. The third Peace church, erected in Głogów, burned down in 1758. The exterior of the churches look austere due to the religious restrictions of the time, while their interiors are ornately decorated in Baroque style. The interior of the Jawor church is decorated with 180 paintings, depicting Biblical scenes from the Old and the New Testament, while the church in Świdnica features apocalyptic visions as well as the panorama of surrounding area.

Since 2001, the two remaining churches are listed as UNESCO World Heritage Sites:

- Holy Trinity Church of Peace in Świdnica
- Church of Peace in Jawor

== History ==
Despite the physical and political constraints, three of the churches became the biggest timber-framed religious buildings in Europe due to pioneering construction and architectural solutions.

The church in Jawor, dedicated to the Holy Ghost is 43.5-metre (143 ft) long, 14-metre (46 ft) wide and 15.7-metre (52 ft) high and has capacity of 5,500. It was constructed by architect Albrecht von Saebisch (1610–1688) from Wroclaw (then German Breslau) and was finished a year later in 1655. The 200 paintings inside by were created by Georg Flegel in 1671–1681. The ornately decorated altar, by Martin Schneider, dates to 1672, the original organ of J. Hoferichter from Legnica (then German Liegnitz) of 1664 was replaced in 1855–1856 by Adolf Alexander Lummert.

By that time, the town had been part of the majority Protestant Kingdom of Prussia for about a century. Another 100 years later, in 1945, the town became again part of Poland, as a result of the Potsdam Agreement. Although most of the Protestant churches taken over by Poland in 1945 became Catholic, the two Peace Churches still serve their Lutheran parishes.

The similar church, erected in Głogów (then German Glogau) burned down in 1758, but the one in Świdnica, dedicated to the Holy Trinity, survived like the one in Jawor. Both were restored by a Polish–German cooperation, and recognized by UNESCO in 2001.

The three Churches of Peace (around 1750)

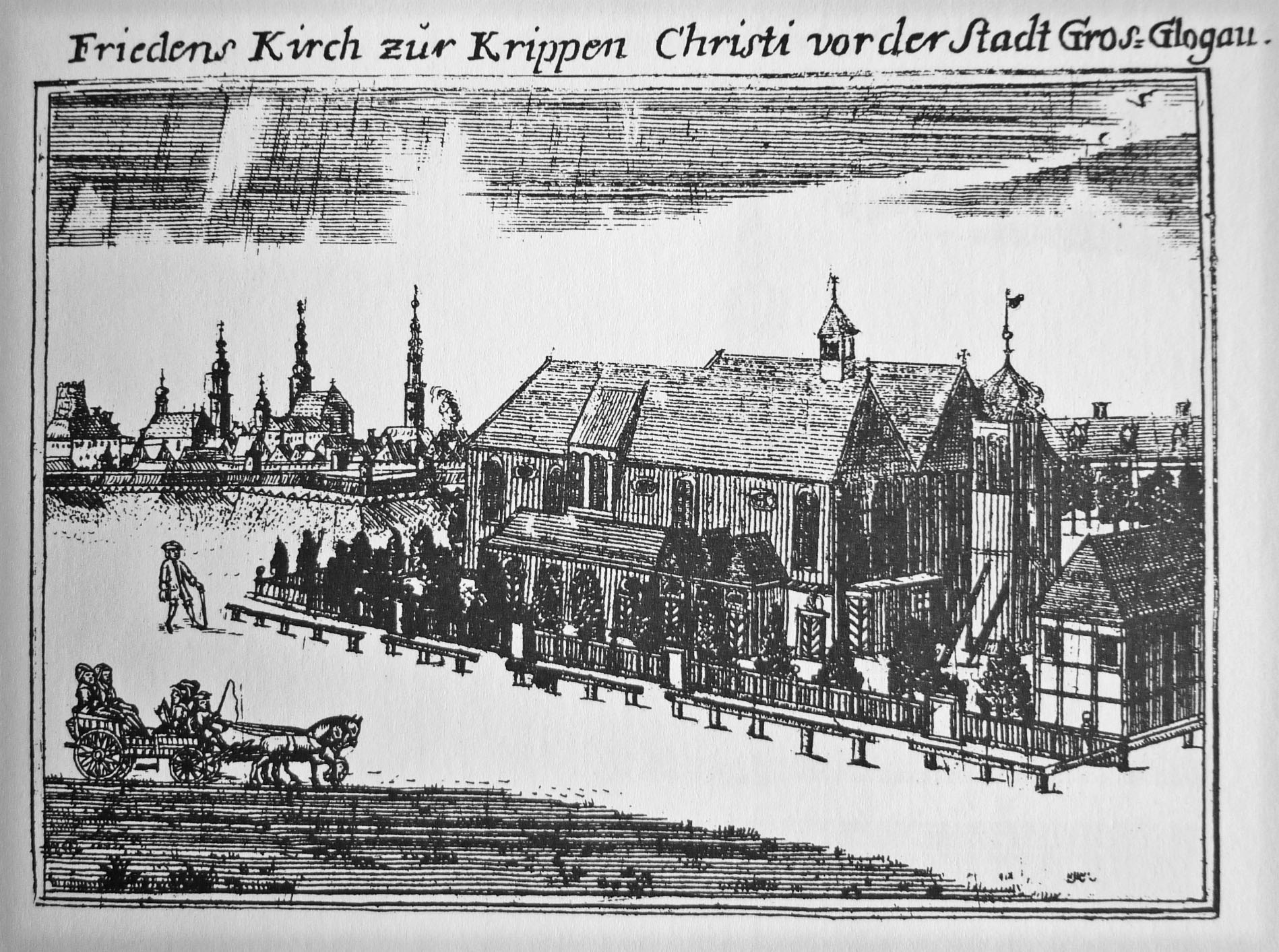
Glogau (Głogów)

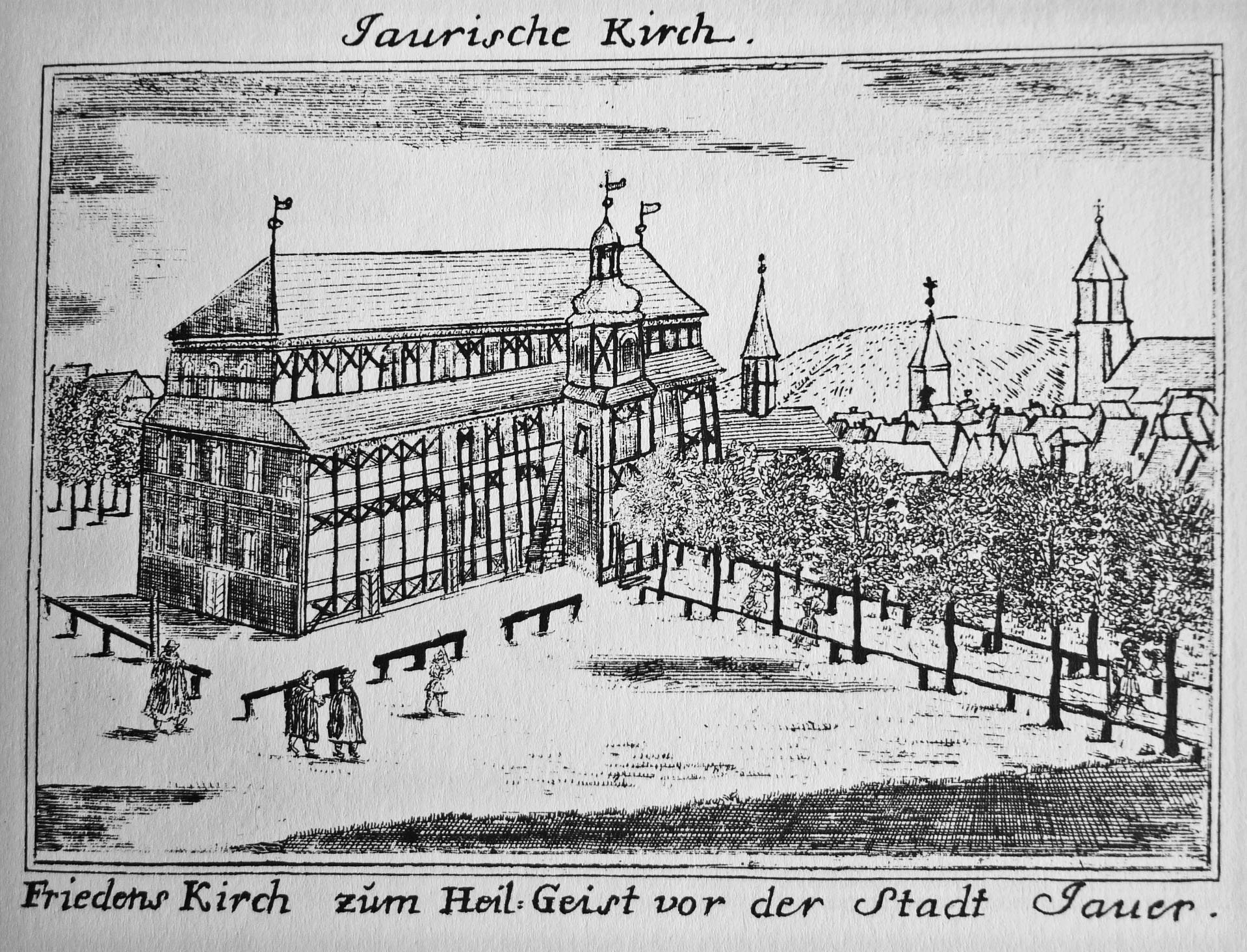
Jauer (Jawor)

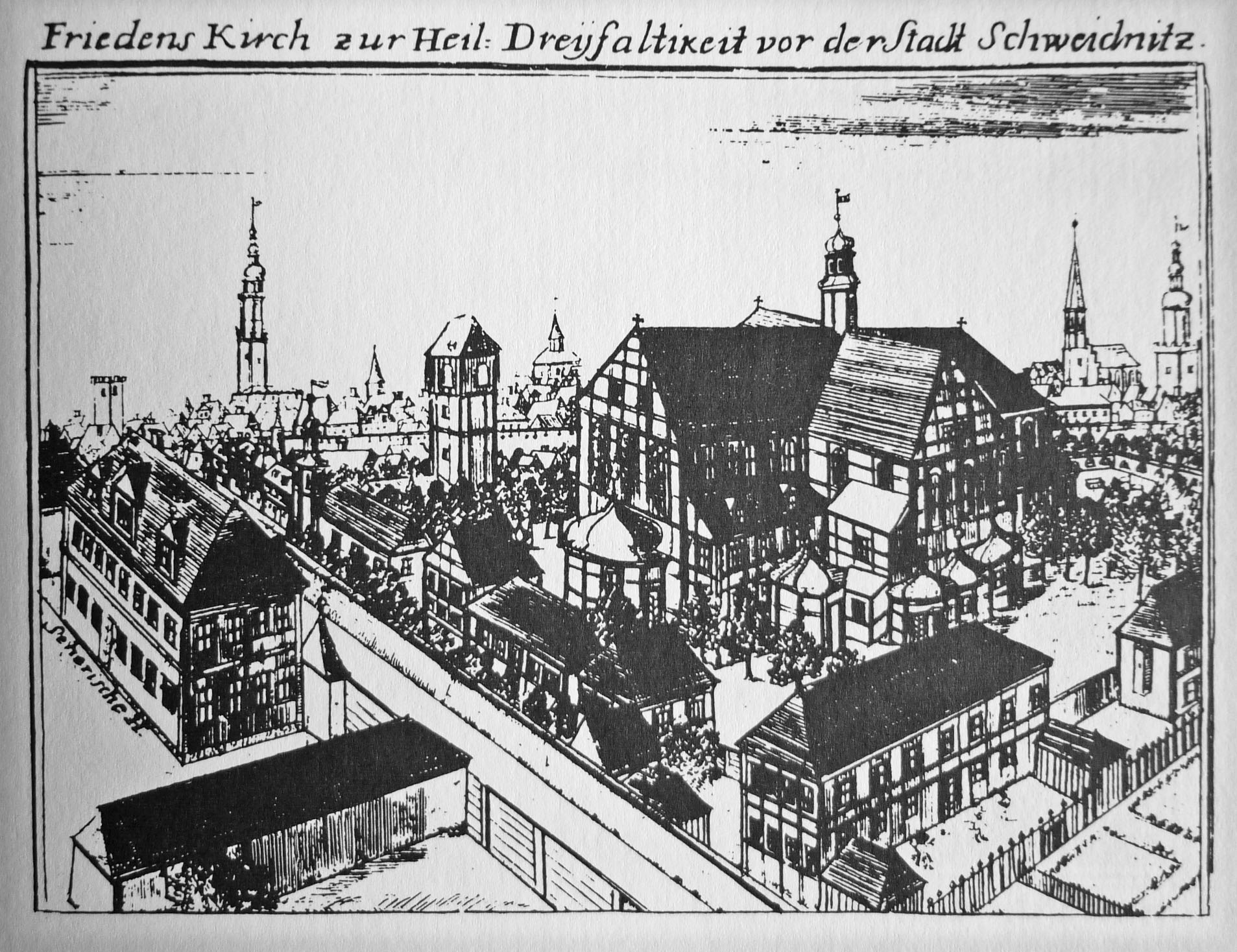
Schweidnitz (Świdnica)

== Gallery ==
=== Świdnica ===
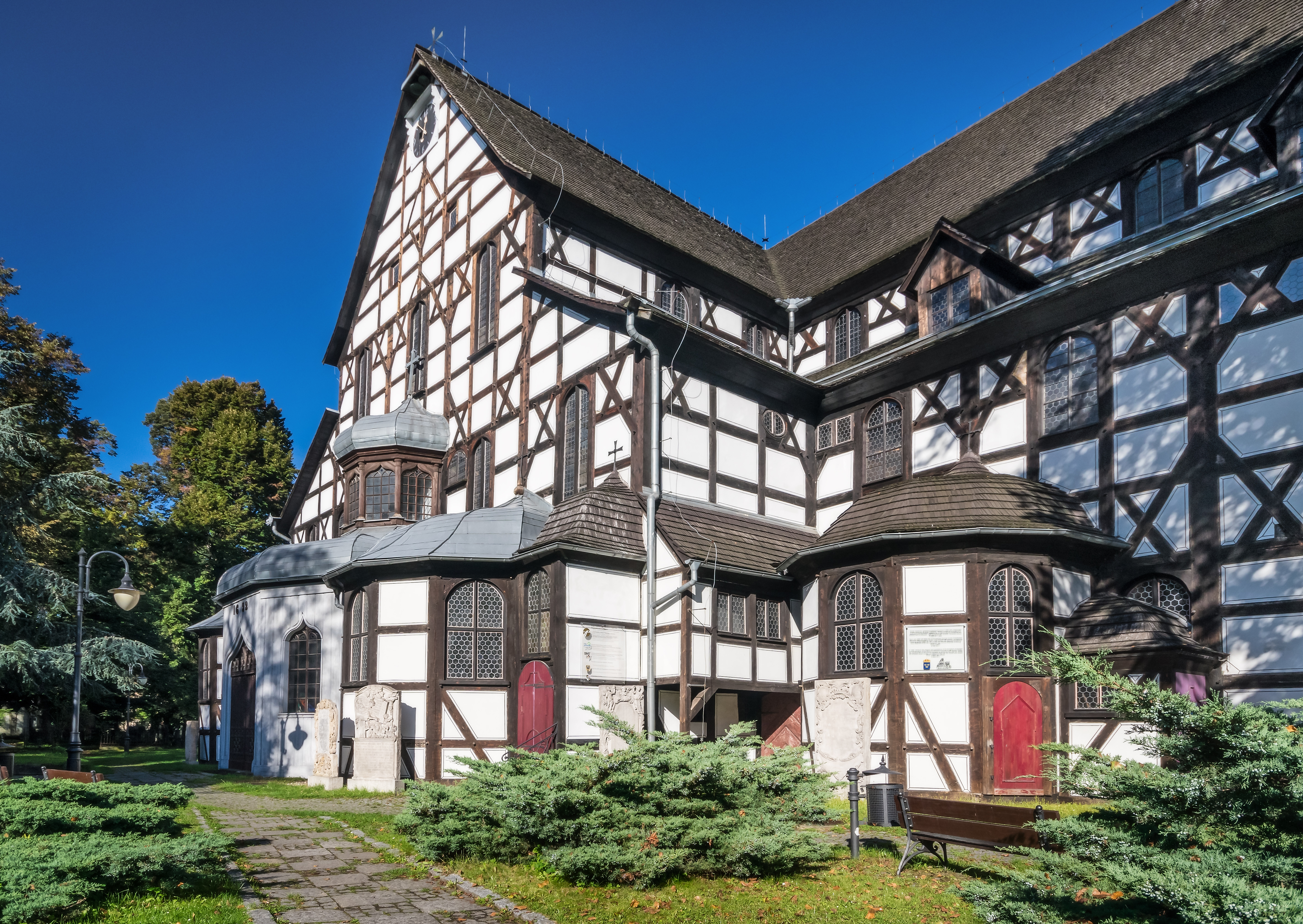

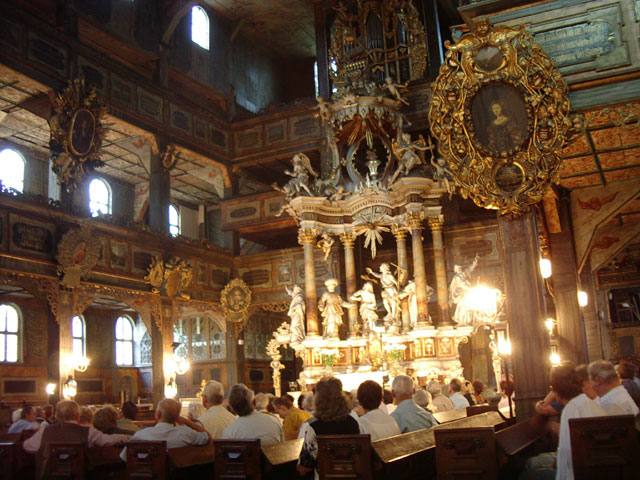
Main altar

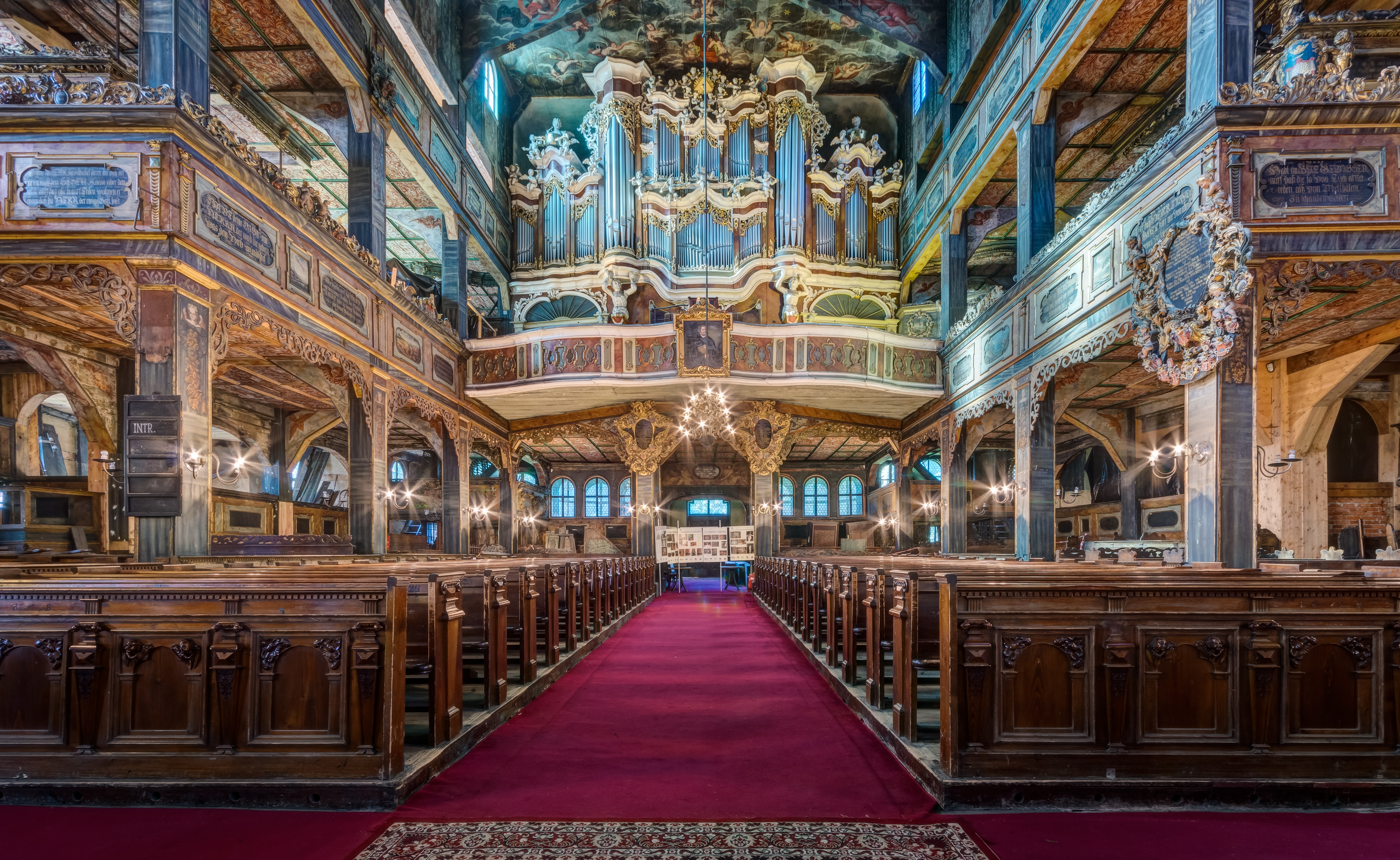

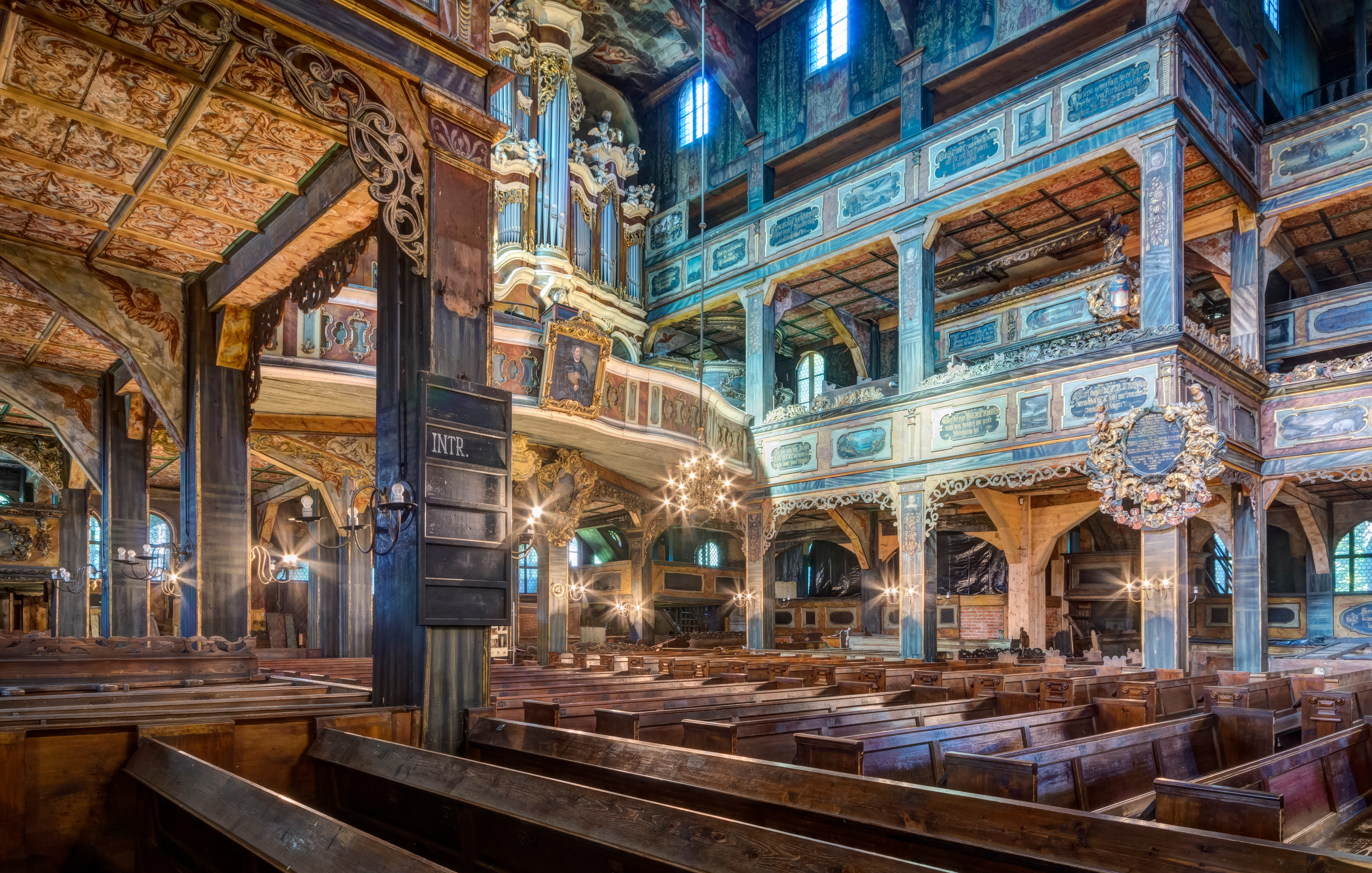

=== Jawor ===
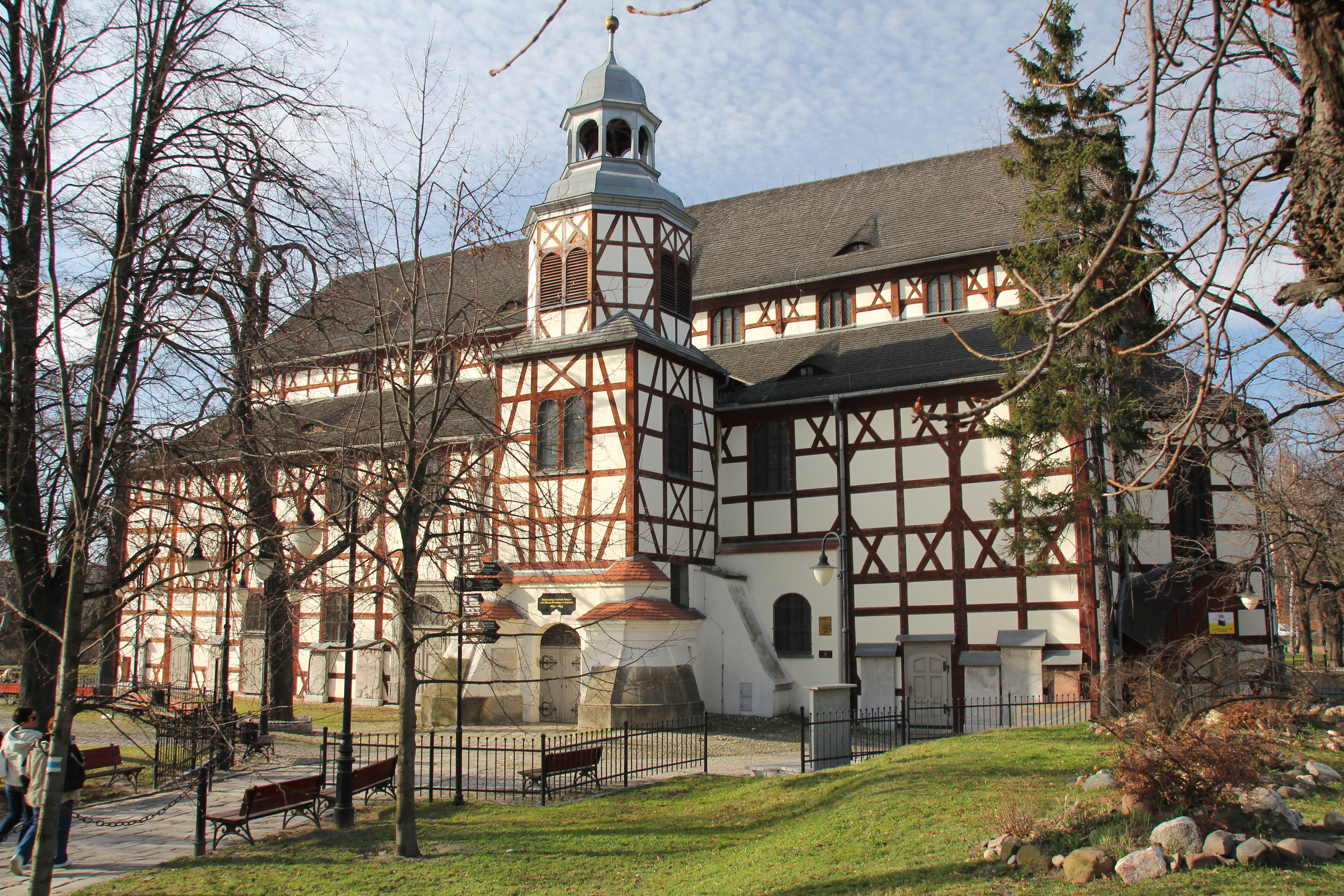

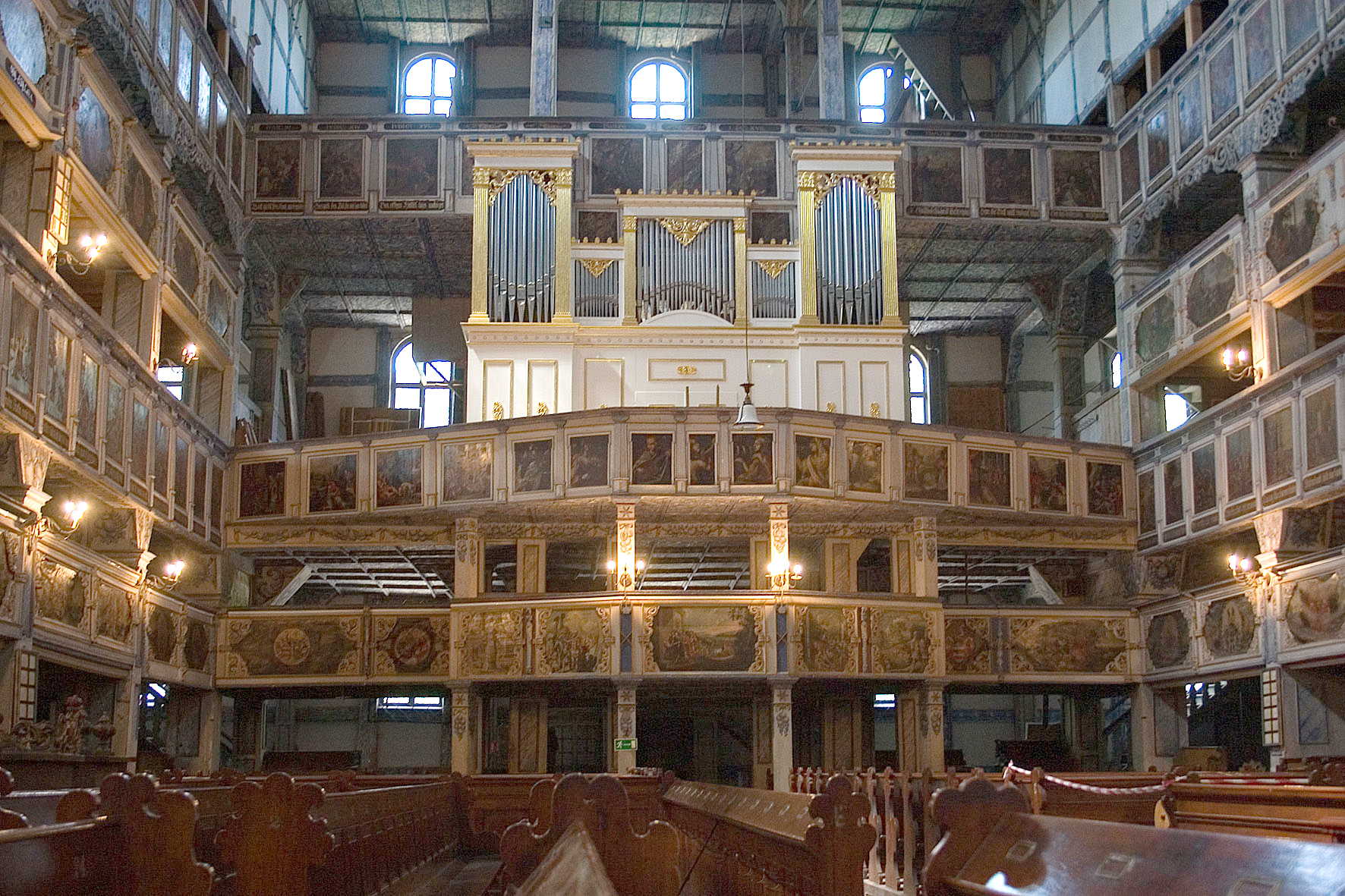
Organ

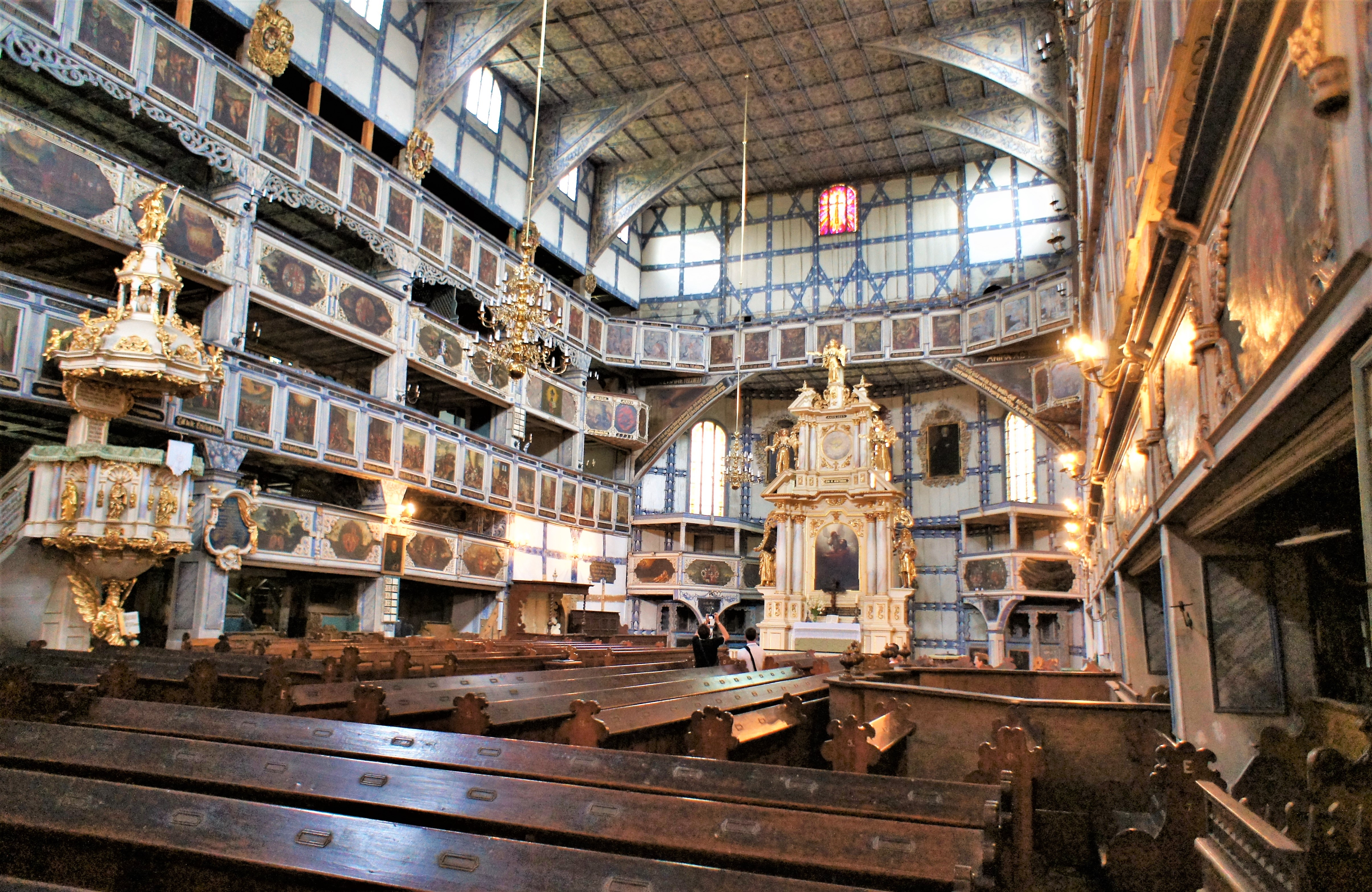
Main altar

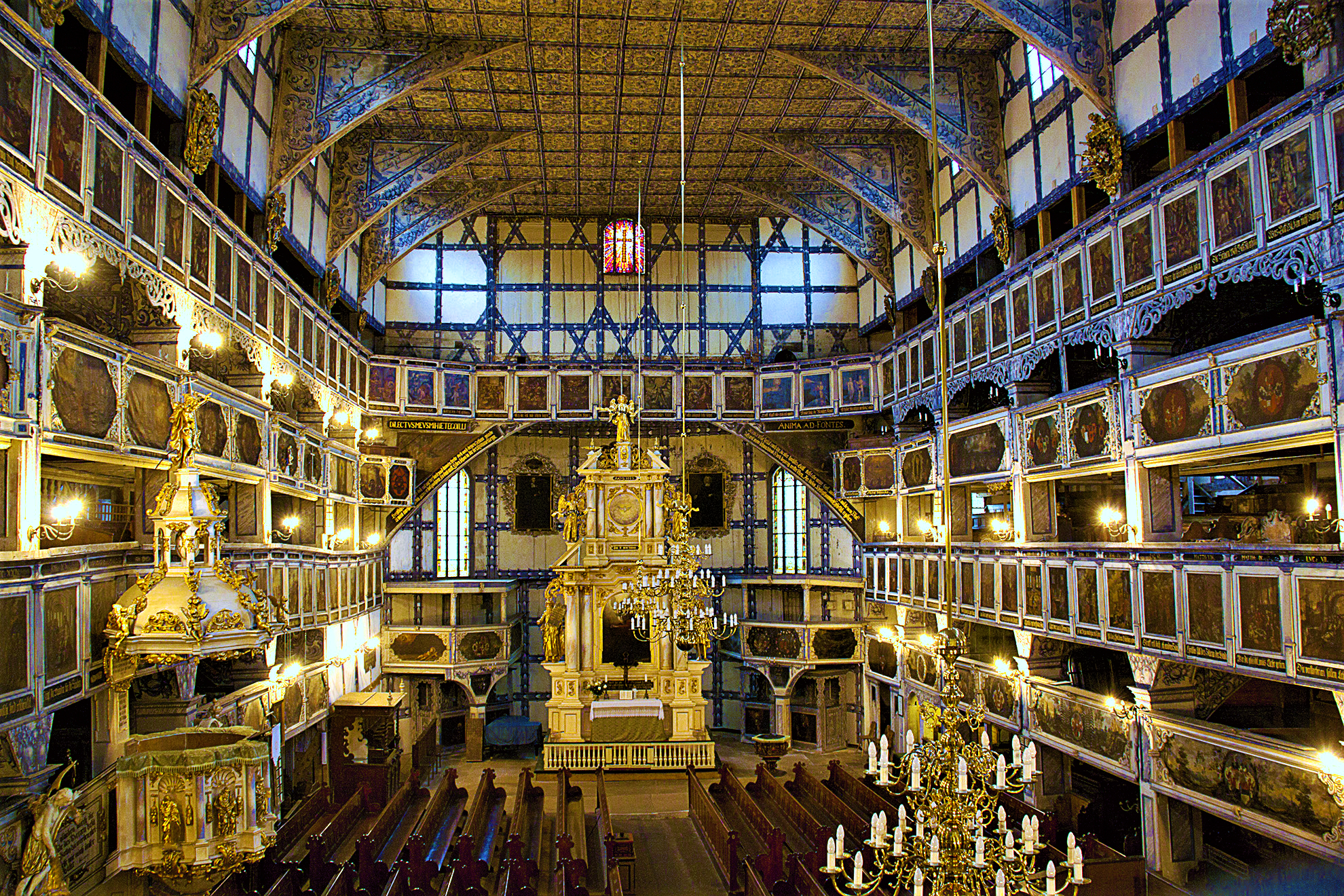

== Surroundings ==
- Gola Dzierżoniowska Castle
- Medieval town of Niemcza
- Cistercian monastery at Henryków
- Wojsławice Arboretum

== Bibliography ==
- Worthmann, Ludwig, Führer durch die Friedenskirche zu Schweidnitz. Breslau 1929.
- Kalinowski, Konstanty, Barock in Schlesien. München 1990. ISBN 3-422-06047-2.
- Gruk, Wojciech, Silesian Churches of Peace and the Royal Hungarian Articular Churches. Possible Legal and Architectural Relations. In: Protestantischer Kirchenbau der Frühen Neuzeit in Europa. Grundlagen und neue Forschungskonzepte. — Protestant Church Architecture in Early Modern Europe. Fundamentals and New Research Approaches. Regensburg 2015, p. 333-343. ISBN 978-3-7954-2942-3.
